= Violence against women in Mexico =

The United Nations (UN) has rated Mexico as one of the most violent countries for women in the world. According to the National Institute of Statistics and Geography in Mexico (INEGI), 66.1 percent of all women ages 15 and older have experienced some kind of violence in their lives. Forty-nine percent have suffered from emotional violence; 29 percent have suffered from emotional-patrimonial violence or discrimination; 34 percent from physical violence; and 41.3 percent of women have suffered from sexual violence. Of the women who were assaulted in some form from 2015 to 2018, 93.7 percent did not seek help or report their attacks to authorities. The issue is shaped even more by regional disparities, judgement of a lack of government action and the increasing role of social movements against gender-based violence.

Although there is an increasing number of feminicides in Mexico, not enough cases are investigated as they do not meet or were not reported under the feminicide state criminal codes representing some of the unreported cases.

According to studies conducted by the WHO, women in developing countries are more prone to justify violence or violent crimes against the female gender. Despite the growing number or protest and advocacy in Mexico for violence against women, there seems to be some lack of efficiency as violence against women only continues to grow.

There are different explanations for the causes of these high numbers of violence; scholars have looked at the cultural roots as well as economic policies and changes that have led to a recent growth in the amount of gender-based violence. There was a rise of international attention looking at the state of violence against women in Mexico in the early 1990s, as the number of missing and murdered women in the northern border city of Ciudad Juárez began to rise dramatically. Women in the Mexican drug war (2006–present) have been raped, tortured, and murdered in the conflict. Women have also been victims of sex trafficking in Mexico.

While legislation and different policies have been put in place to decrease violence against women in Mexico, different organizations have shown that these policies have had little effect on the state of violence due to a lack of proper implementation. Mexico has made plans and wanted to implement nationals laws against discrimination that aim to strengthen not just the laws but also the community.

== Cultural roots ==
Susan Pick, Carmen Contreras, and Alicia Barker-Aguilar, researchers from the Mexican Institute for Family and Population Research (IMIFAP), examine the cultural roots that play a role in the current state of violence against women in Mexico. They look into the culture of "machismo" that has created a feeling of superiority or entitlement for men in Mexico. Women, on the other hand, have been traditionally put into roles of subservience due to the culture of "marianismo" and have had less access to knowledge and power to discuss and change the current norms. They call violence against women "an expression of male power," and they include institutional forms of violence, such as lack of access to resources or types of freedom.

=== Origin of machismo and marianismo ===
Liberation theologian Virgil Elizondo has argued, "The devotion to Mary is the most popular, persistent, and original characteristic of Latin American Christianity". Other scholars have also agreed with this point of view, arguing that when Spanish conquistador, Hernan Cortes, landed in Tenochtitlan (present day Mexico City) in 1519, he imposed Spains' gender norms and Christian evangelization beliefs on to the indigenous societies. As a result of Spanish colonization, the ideological gender models of marianismo and machismo were embedded into Mexican society.

==== Pre-colonial gender norms ====
Pre colonial indigenous groups such as the Mexica, Quechua and the Aztecs believed in a gender complementary and parallel society; men and women operated in two separate but equal, interdependent divisions. For example, both Aztec men and women had their own political systems in which same-sex rulers were appointed to government. These appointed officials would then discuss political related concerns over the general population and generate solutions together. Men nor women overpowered one another because the Aztecs believed that the creation of a human was equally made by both genders, therefore they were each to be treated and respected equally within society. As a result, women had many political freedoms and the opportunity to achieve economic independence. Women had the liberty to choose from a variety of jobs ranging from being a midwife to a market trader. In addition, they could own various forms of wealth assets including: houses, land and movable goods. If a woman owned land before marriage, she still maintained independent control over her property and could choose who inherited her assets without needing the disclosure of her husband. The term "woman land" is found across Nahuatl documents, the Aztec language, indicating land was passed down to a woman either through "inheritance, dowries, or gifts". However, Aztec women's rights were taken away with the arrival of Spanish conquistadors.

==== Post-colonial gender norms ====
When the Spanish conquered Tenotchitlan in the 16th century, indigenous societies became male dominated as women could no longer hold positions in government or religion, nor have control over their own personal assets. In 1530 the Spanish converted the once male and female controlled Mexican urban market into a solely male supervised system. Thus, men had control over price management in the market, and prohibited women from purchasing or owning land without consent of their husbands. Cacicas, elite women in the Aztec empire, were forced to surrender their power to their husbands once they were married. It is argued by Karen Powers, an ethnohistorian, that as indigenous men were given more authoritative power by the Spanish, the "machista" mentality started to plague their minds. Under Spanish law, the church granted men authority to punish their wives or sisters if they failed to be obedient. Indigenous women were strongly advised to follow the tenets of the Virgin Mary, often referred by scholars as "marianismo". Women were forced to embody the submissive, chastity and modest nature of the Virgin Mary. If the Catholic church suspected a woman was not following these pillars they were viewed as evil and were closely monitored. The Spanish conquest changed the division of labor in the Aztec society, women were now expected to remain at home, attend to their husband and children.

==== Alternative perspective ====
Renowned Mexican psychologist Samuel Ramos has offered a different explanation as to the origination of machismo. He argues indigenous men adopted a hyper masculine attitude as a result of feeling inferior to Spanish conquistadors. This "machista" attitude was then adopted by indigenous men to compensate for not being able to protect their land from the Spanish.

===== Colonialism, neoliberalism, and gender-based violence in Mexico: A postcolonial analysis =====
The systemic violence against women in Mexico is deeply rooted in the nation's colonial and post-colonial history. Understanding the contemporary crisis of gender-based violence, including the alarming rates of femicide, requires tracing the layered impact of colonialism, neoliberal economic reforms, and cultural norms shaped over centuries. This essay examines how these structural and historical forces continue to shape gender roles and perpetuate violence against women in Mexico.

===== Colonialism and the transformation of gender roles =====
Colonialism fundamentally disrupted Indigenous gender systems in Mexico, imposing rigid European patriarchal norms that redefined women's roles in both the public and private spheres. Prior to colonization, many Indigenous societies in Mesoamerica recognized women as spiritual leaders, healers, and key contributors to the social and economic life of their communities. These roles were deeply integrated into communal structures that valued reciprocity and balance between genders (Powers, 2006).

However, with the Spanish conquest came the imposition of Catholic ideologies and European family models, which subordinated women to male authority figures in both church and household. The Spanish colonial regime restructured Indigenous societies to align with patriarchal norms that emphasized female submission, domesticity, and moral purity (Powers, 2006). This shift was not only spiritual and cultural but also institutional, as women were denied participation in legal, political, and economic life. Over time, these imposed roles became embedded in Mexican society, creating a long-lasting foundation for systemic gender inequality.

Even today, the lingering influence of these colonial-era hierarchies continues to define women's social roles and access to power. This legacy can be seen in Mexico's persistently high rates of intimate partner violence and in the underrepresentation of women in political leadership. The colonial construction of women as passive and morally inferior continues to inform both state policies and social attitudes toward gender, reinforcing a system in which women are more vulnerable to violence and marginalization.

===== Neoliberalism and gendered economic insecurity =====
In the latter part of the 20th century, neoliberal reforms further compounded the structural inequalities faced by women in Mexico. Beginning in the 1980s, the Mexican government implemented a series of structural adjustment programs promoted by international financial institutions such as the International Monetary Fund and the World Bank. These reforms emphasized deregulation, privatization, and the reduction of public spending, which disproportionately affected the most vulnerable sectors of society—especially women in the informal economy (Olivera, 2008).

As state support for education, healthcare, and social services diminished, women—particularly single mothers and Indigenous women—were left to shoulder the burden of care work and survival in precarious economic conditions. Informal sector jobs, including domestic work and street vending, became the only accessible means of livelihood for many women, yet these roles offered no labor protections or social security (Wright, 2006). The feminization of poverty intensified, as neoliberal policies ignored the intersecting oppressions of gender, race, and class.

Moreover, the globalized maquiladora industry, which employs hundreds of thousands of Mexican women in export-oriented manufacturing along the U.S.-Mexico border, has been criticized for exploitative labor conditions. These factories rely on the perceived docility and disposability of female laborers—a narrative rooted in both colonial ideology and modern capitalism (Wright, 2006). The economic marginalization of women under neoliberalism is thus not just a byproduct of policy but a deliberate mechanism of control that reproduces systemic gender hierarchies.

This economic vulnerability directly correlates with an increased risk of gender-based violence. When women lack access to stable employment, legal protections, and support services, they become more susceptible to exploitation and abuse, both in domestic spaces and in the workplace. Neoliberalism, while often framed as a neutral economic ideology, has had gendered consequences that continue to endanger women's lives in Mexico.

===== Gender-based violence as a postcolonial legacy =====
One of the most visible and devastating manifestations of these intersecting forces is the high rate of gender-based violence in Mexico, particularly femicide—the intentional killing of women because of their gender. According to Amnesty International (2016), the Mexican legal system often fails to investigate or prosecute cases of violence against women, leading to a culture of impunity that further emboldens perpetrators.There are noted times when the investigative process was inconsistent or incomplete, further contributing to perceptions on impunity. Victims are frequently blamed, their cases dismissed, and justice delayed or denied altogether.

This systemic failure cannot be separated from the postcolonial power structures that normalize the marginalization and devaluation of women. Cultural attitudes shaped by both colonial patriarchal norms and modern media representations continue to portray women as subordinate and objectified, reinforcing cycles of abuse. As Pick, Contreras, and Barker-Aguilar (2015) note, deeply entrenched machismo and institutional corruption intersect to create a social environment in which violence against women is both normalized and rarely punished.

The city of Ciudad Juárez, often cited as the epicenter of Mexico's femicide crisis, exemplifies this phenomenon. Since the 1990s, hundreds of women—many of them maquiladora workers—have been murdered with little to no legal recourse. The violence in Juárez and beyond reflects a broader crisis of state accountability and social indifference to the lives of marginalized women (BBC News, 2022).

International and grassroots feminist organizations have been instrumental in drawing attention to this crisis, pressuring both domestic and international bodies to take action. Multiple of these organizations have criticized the government for insufficient or uneven implementation of policies addressing gender-based violence. Their work highlights the importance of viewing gender-based violence not just as individual acts of cruelty but as symptoms of larger structural inequalities rooted in colonialism, economic policy, and cultural hegemony.

===== Conclusion =====
The ongoing violence against women in Mexico cannot be understood outside the historical and structural context in which it exists. From colonialism's imposition of patriarchal gender norms to the neoliberal economic policies that have exacerbated gendered precarity, the systemic oppression of women in Mexico is both historical and contemporary. Gender-based violence is not an anomaly but a manifestation of these deeply embedded power structures.

Addressing this crisis requires not only legal reform and better enforcement but also a critical reexamination of the historical narratives and economic policies that have shaped gender relations in Mexico. Feminist scholarship and activism play a vital role in challenging these systems and imagining alternative futures in which gender equity and justice are possible.

== Economic roots ==
Mercedes Olivera looks at the way that gender dynamics have changed recently, especially with the introduction of neoliberal economic policies in Mexico. Mercedes Olivera is a researcher at the Center for Higher Studies of Mexico and Central America in the Universidad de Ciencias y Artes of Chiapas, and she is involved in the Independent Women's Movement and the Center for Women's Rights. Olivera argues that as poverty, unemployment, and insecurity have increased in Mexico, more women have started joining the workplace in order to attempt to escape their situations. This progression of increasing numbers of women in the workplace has threatened the concept of a division of labor between men and women, where men's place was the workplace and that the duties of the women are in the home. According to Olivera, this change has affected men's self-image and harmed their personal sense of "machismo" or superiority.

Additionally there is a discrepancy in the information most citizens know about how services are impacted by the supply and demand in the countries economy. The demand for these services proceeds from cases of women suffering violent acts or any form of physical, verbal or psycho-social abuse and if they were appropriately reported. While the supply is related to the governmental regulations, mechanisms, and institutions that have been established to provide the affected women with these services. In 2003 the Attorney General of Mexico City, Alvarez de Lara, reported that about 15% of the women suffering from domestic violence were the head of their home. With the inequalities of societal norms and lack of governmental regulations to support the development of women, it was stated by the World Bank that in Mexico a working women only makes 68 cents of a dollar to what a man typically makes. Often leading women to remain in abuse relationships in order to maintain some financial stability.

== Types of violence ==
=== Femicide ===
Femicide, also known as feminicide, is defined in a report by the World Health Organization (WHO) as the "intentional murder of women because they are women." Similarly, it is defined by UN Women, UNiTe to End Violence Against Women, and the Office of the United Nations High Commissioner for Human Rights as "the violent death of women for reasons of gender." Femicide is categorized as a specific type of violence against women or gender violence, which the UN described in 1979 as "a mechanism of domination, control, oppression, and power over women." Femicide in Latin America, specifically, has persisted as an issue, due to factors such as organized crime, gender norms, and lack of effective legislature to address it.

Amnesty International estimates that there were 34,000 female homicides in Mexico between 1986 and 2009. In 2012, Mexico was ranked as the 16th country with the highest rates of femicides. Moreover, between 2011 and 2016, there were an average of 7.6 female homicides per day. In 2016, Mexico had a rate of 4.6 femicides per 100,000 women, and there were a total of 2,746 female deaths with the presumption of them being homicides. In this same year, the top three states with the highest rates of female deaths with presumption of homicide were Colima (with 16.3 deaths per 100,000 women), Guerrero (13.1 per 100,000 women), and Zacatecas (9.7 per 100,000 women). The top three municipalities in 2016 were Acapulco de Juárez (24.22 per 100,000 women), Tijuana (10.84 per 100,000 women), and Juárez (10.36 per 100,000 women). During 2002 to 2010, the state of Chihuahua had the highest rate of female homicides in the world: 58.4 per 100,000 women. After 2010, the rates of femicide in the municipality of Juárez did decrease significantly; in 2011, the rate of female deaths with presumption of homicides was 31.49 per 100,000 women, and by 2016 it had decreased to 10.36 per 100,000 women. However, in 2019, the Mexican government recorded 1,006 incidents of Femicide — a 10 percent increase from 2018. For this same year an average of 10 women were killed every day in Mexico, while two years before in 2017 the rate was at seven per day .

Female deaths with presumption of homicide, 2000-2016
Year	2000	2001	2002	2003	2004	2005	2006	2007	2008	2009	2010	2011	2012	2013	2014	2015	2016
Rate per 100,000 women	2.7	2.7	2.7	2.6	2.5	2.6	2.6	2.2	2.8	3.6	4.5	5.1	5.0	4.6	4.1	4.0	4.6

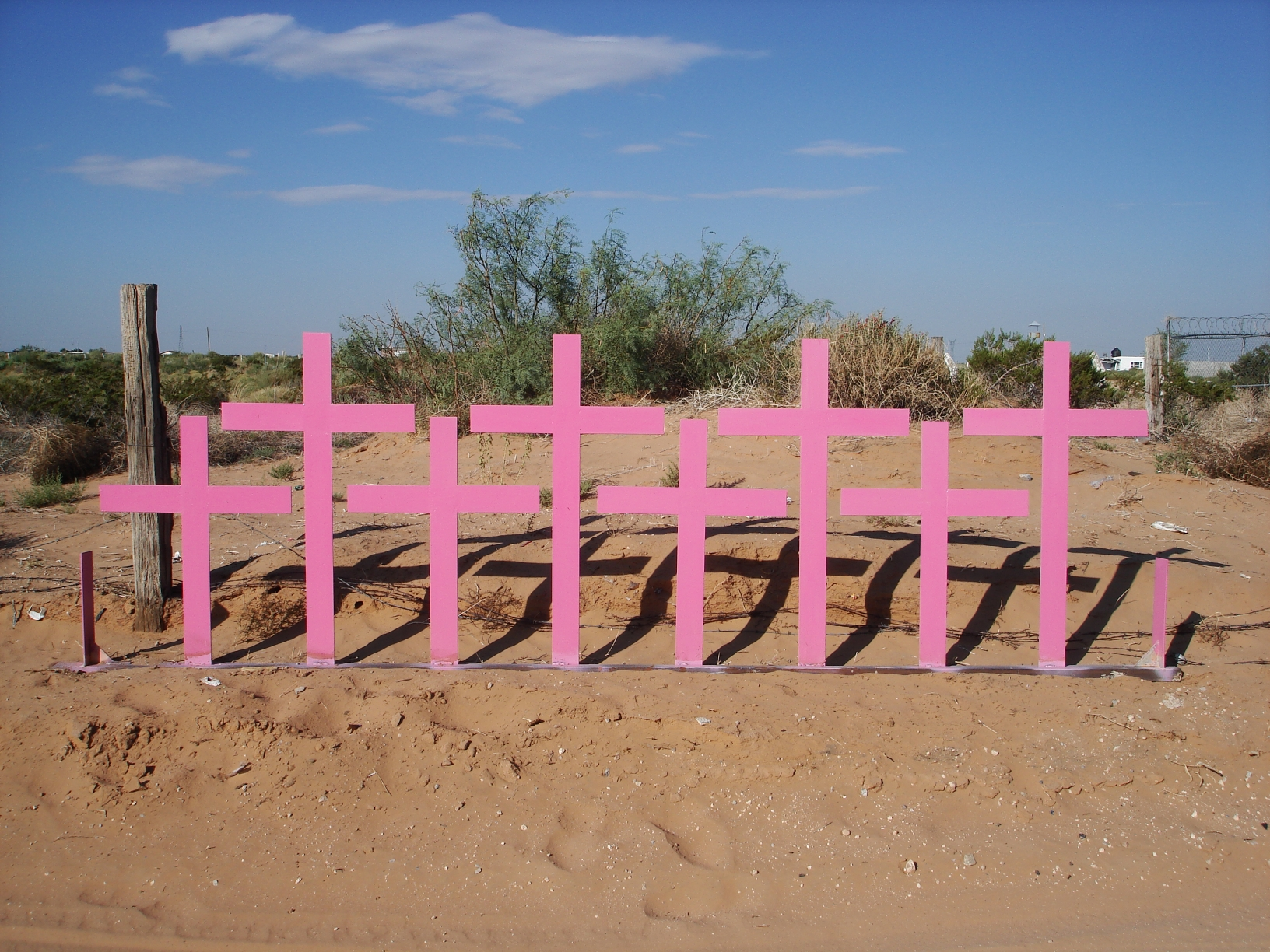
Crosses in the city of Ciudad Juárez, Chihuahua, were placed in the spot where 8 victims of femicide were found in 1996.

==== Femicide in Ciudad Juárez ====
Ciudad Juárez is a city in northern Mexico in the state of Chihuahua located on the border between Mexico and the United States; it is located within the municipality of Juárez, Chihuahua. The first major cases of female homicides in Ciudad Juárez were in the early 1990s, during which the city and events gained international attention. It is claimed by scholars, that the initial rise in femicide cases in Ciudad Juárez were related to the establishment of the maquiladora industry in 1993. Over the course of just a decade, hundreds of women were reported missing. According to a report by Amnesty International, in 2010 there were 320 women killed in the city of Ciudad Juárez. Amnesty International has also reported the lack of response by authorities in Ciudad Juárez and Mexico, as well as the irregularities in investigations concerning missing or killed women.

===== Maquiladoras and NAFTA =====
In 1993, the North American Free Trade Agreement (NAFTA) was signed by the United States, Mexico and Canada. The purpose of NAFTA was to help North American countries remain competitive within the global market. As a result of the agreement, industries expanded and the three countries were able to trade at low cost. American industries such as General Electric, Alcoa and DuPont transferred their factory locations to Juarez, Mexico to take advantage of the cheap labor. In fact 80% of border factories/maquiladoras in Juarez are U.S. owned. NAFTA helped create 1.2 million jobs in Mexico, and over 25% of those opportunities were in the maquiladoras of Juarez. Elvia Arriola, professor at Northern Illinois University College of Law, has argued that the creation of jobs attracted over tens of thousands of poor women from all over Mexico and Central America to Juarez. According to the Council of Hemispheric Affairs, women earned an average of fifty five dollars for the 48 hours they worked a week at a maquiladoras. Rosa Fregoso, professor and former Chair of Latin American and Latino Studies at the University of California-Santa Cruz, reported that women's dismembered bodies were found in the deserts of Juarez one year after NAFTA was signed. From 1994 to 2000 it is estimated 300-400 women were murdered in Juarez, one third of them being identified as maquiladora workers. In less than a decade, the once low homicide reporting Juarez became known as the "murder capital of the world".

====== Female maquiladora workers ======
Human rights activist, Esther Chávez Cano stated, "If you want to rape and kill a woman, there is no better place to do it than Juarez". Katherine Pantaleo, professor at the Department of Criminology at Indiana University of Pennsylvania, argued that women of Juarez became an easy target for men to kill as they were constantly being attracted by maquiladora worksites. The factories paid women higher wages compared to other employment opportunities in Mexico. Additionally, maquiladoras were just as interested in hiring women. Elvia Arriola explains that employers prefer hiring women because they have smaller hands which are useful in assembling intricate goods, are considered to be more submissive than Mexican men, and are less likely to unionize against the factory. According to Mother Jones, women and young girls compose more than 60% of maquiladora workers. However, maquiladoras refuse to employ pregnant women, as the Mexican government requires companies to provide monetary aid to pregnant employees. As a result, maquiladoras conduct routine pregnancy tests on their female employees, and analyze their sanitary napkins every menstrual cycle. Birth control pills are also offered to female employees, but not other health services. Jessica Livingston, scholar, explains that women continue to arrive at Juarez at a rate of forty to sixty thousand per year even with the maquiladoras performing intrusive acts. Leslie Salzinger, a sociologist who worked at a maquiladora in Juarez, argues that women continue to go work at maquiladoras for a sense of independence, an opportunity to earn their own money.

====== Response to the maquiladora killings ======
Maquiladora corporations and Mexican officials did not take safety measures to protect female employees after the rise of femicide cases in Juarez. Reported by victims families, Mexican authorities blamed the disappearing young girls for living a "double life", suggesting they worked as prostitutes at night. In 1999, Chihuahuas State Public Prosecutor, Arturo Gonzalez Rascon, stated "women with a night life go out very late and come into contact with drinkers. It's hard to go out on the street when it's raining and not get wet". Melissa Wright, scholar of social justice movements within Mexico at Penn State, reported that Chihuahuas Governor Francisco Barrio did not provide extensive resources to further investigate the murders of women. In 1998 the National Commission for Human Rights issued a report, identifying Mexicos negligence in investigating femicide cases. In the report they stated that Mexico was unable to collect evidence, keep record of how many bodies were found, nor identify corpses correctly. After the report was released, Suly Ponce was appointed as the official prosecutor for the women's deaths, and she testified to witnessing police's carelessness at crime scenes as they would ruin evidence with footprints. There were only three successful captures of murderers. In 1995 Egyptian chemist, Abdel Latif Sharif, a convicted sex offender and employee of a US maquiladora plant was charged with killing a woman. One year later, in 1996 a gang by the name of "Los Rebeldes" confessed to killing six women and in 1999 the designated bus drivers for the maquiladora workers confessed to committing five murders. After this success, Mexican police officers attempted to convict more bus drivers for femicide cases. In 1999 four maquiladora bus drivers admitted to 20 murders, however it was later revealed that they were tortured by police into giving a false confession.

==== Femicide cases: 2019-2021 ====
Below is a list of femicide cases that caused public outrage against Mexico's inability to protect women.

===== Abril Perez Sagoan =====
Abril Pérez Sagaón, ex-wife of Amazon México CEO Juan Carlos García, was murdered on November 25, 2019, the same day a "violence against women" march took place. García is the prime suspect in the case. Abril had divorced Garcia after he had fractured her head with a baseball bat 11 months earlier. A judge ruled that it was not attempted murder because Abril was sleeping at the time of the incident and the baseball bat was not to be considered a weapon. The murder occurred three weeks after García's release from prison, but a judge threw the murder charges out. His daughter said the judge, who had earlier released a doctor from charges of sexually abusing a mentally-ill woman, was bribed.

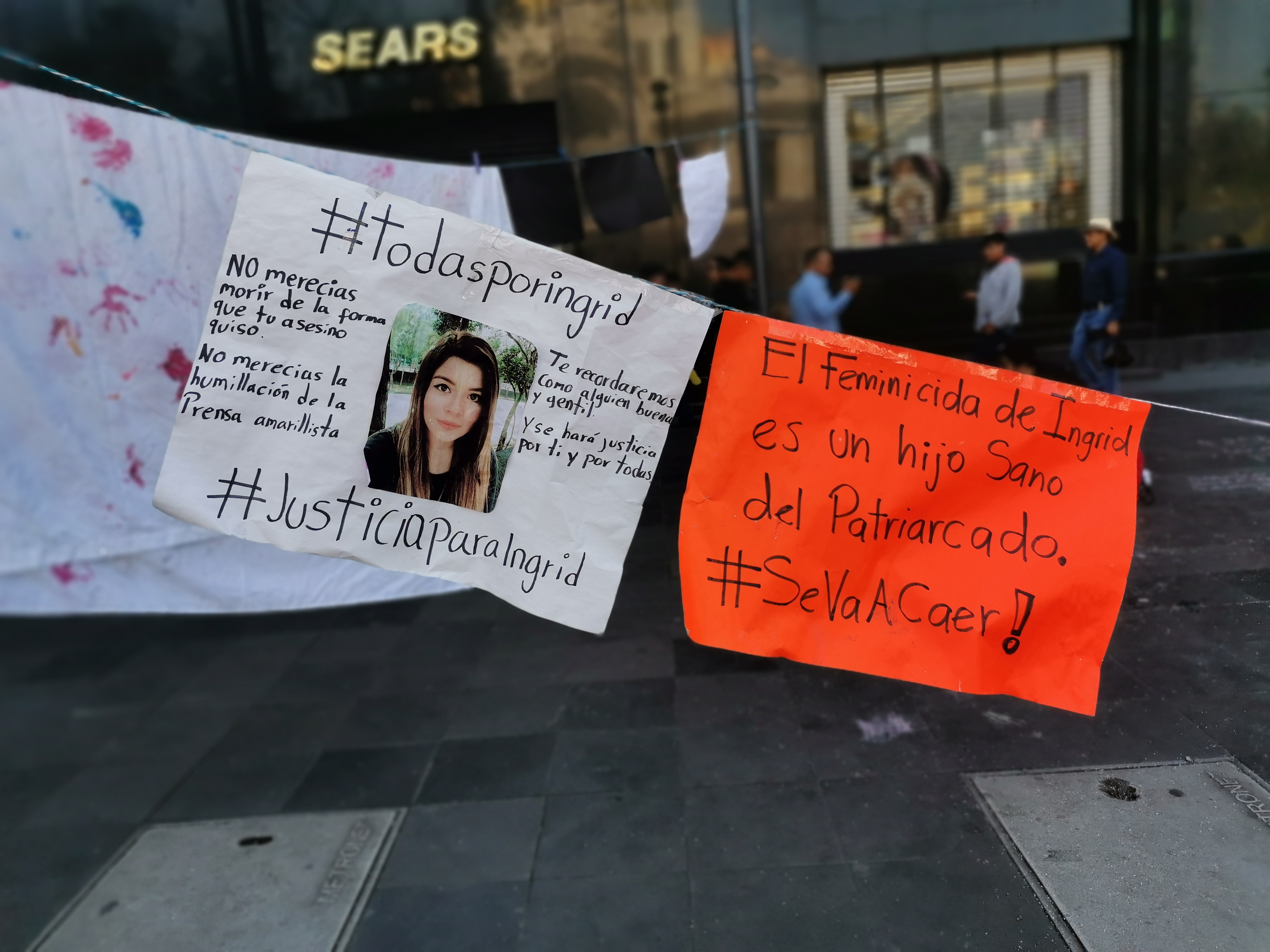
A "#JusticeforIngrid" poster in memory of her life.

===== Ingrid Escamilla =====
Ingrid Escamilla, 25, was skinned and disemboweled by her partner Erik Rosas after an argument on February 9, 2020. Graphic photographs of her corpse were then displayed on the front pages of tabloids and social media. La Prensa defended its policies of reporting on crime but has indicated it will review its policies about publishing explicit photos. Protesters marched to the offices of La Prensa and burned a newspaper delivery truck. In addition, the Pasala newspaper titled the crime story as "It was cupids fault". They could not be reached for comments.

===== Fatima Cecilia Aldrighett =====
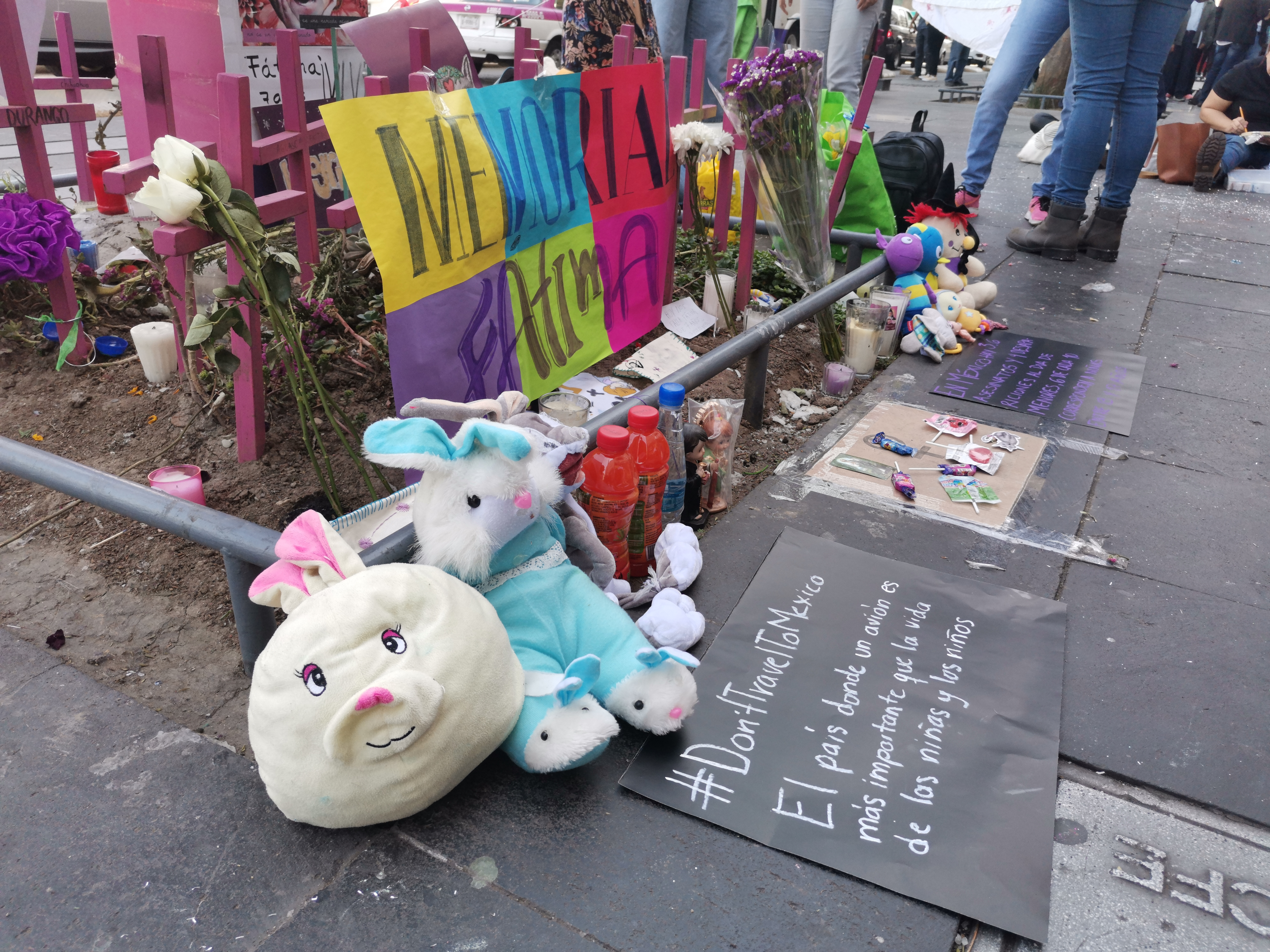
Memorial site made for Fatima Cecilia & Ingrid Escamilla

Another tragic case was that of Fátima Cecilia Aldrighett, 7, who was kidnapped after school on February 11, 2020; her raped and tortured body was discovered on February 15. When the child's mother was late in picking her up from school, she was turned over to an unrelated woman between the ages of 42 and 45 without identification. When questioned, a representative of the Autoridad Federal Educativa de la Ciudad de México (Federal Educational Authority of Mexico City) explained that if a child is not picked up by a parent or guardian within twenty minutes of school closing time, the child should be taken to the local police. Nonetheless, educational authorities insist that children were turned over to their parents according to established protocol. A MXN $2 million (US$107,000) reward was offered for the woman's capture. The woman was identified by her landlord, and when police searched her house they found clothing and other belongings of Fatima; a drone was used to find the woman and a man suspected of the actual murder. Gladys Giovana Cruz Hernandez, who confessed to strangling the girl, and Mario Alberto Reyes Najara, who was looking for a young girlfriend, were arrested on February 19. Members of all political parties have called for legislative reforms; the Chamber of Deputies approved a change in the law to make femicides punishable by 65 years in prison instead of 45 years. Legislators also held a moment of silence for Fatima.

===== Mariana Sanchez Davalos =====
On February 1, 2021, Olga Sánchez Cordero, Secretary of the Interior (SEGOB), said that the death of Mariana Sánchez Dávalos, a 24-year-old recently graduated doctor in Nueva Palestina, Ocosingo, Chiapas, would be investigated as a femicide. Two months earlier she had denounced a sexual attack that had not been followed up by the state prosecutor (FGE). Her death had been classified as a suicide, despite evidence of violence and strangulation.

==== Discrepancies in femicide data ====
In 2012, Mexico created a new crime category for femicides, in hopes of understanding the magnitude of the issue. From 2015 to 2019 the Secretary General of National Public Security (SESNSP) reported an increase in femicide cases from 411 to 983, a 139% difference. However, not all states within Mexico were enforced to adopt femicide into their penal code, therefore there are still many femicide cases that go unreported. Currently, only 13 out of 32 states in Mexico have included femicide into their penal codes: Chiapas, Colima, Districto Federal, Durango, Estado de Mexico, Guanajuato, Guerrero, Morelos, San Luis Potosí, Sinaloa, Tamaulipas, Tabasco and Veracruz. Still, each state differs the way in which they classify femicides, due to Mexicos vague definition. This increases the risk of cases being misclassified. For example, Chihuahua does not consider the killing of a women, different from a homicide. According to the National Citizen Observatory on Femicide, only 49 percent of the 800 cases of women killed in Mexico between June and July 2017 were investigated as femicide. In an attempt to accurately quantify femicide cases, local activist Maria Salguero has created an interactive map tracking femicides based on local and national news reports. In addition, community organizations such as Casa Amiga, a rape crisis shelter in Juarez, have made an effort at collecting femicide cases at the border. Torreblanca, the director of data analysis at Data Civica, urges the Mexican government to improve the current femicide database, in order to best combat the issue.

=== Sexual harassment and assault ===
The National Institute of Statistics and Geography in Mexico (INEGI) reported that almost 3 million sexual attacks, ranging from rape to groping or other forms of sexual harassment, occurred between 2010 and 2015. In 2009, there were 2,795 convictions of rape, but there were 3,462 prosecutions and 14,829 complaints of rape in Mexico. It has been shown through numerous surveys that the majority of women in Mexico do not report rape to authorities; these studies have shown that as few as 15 percent of rapes are reported. An INEGI report in 2017 found that of the women attending school in the prior 12 months, 10.7 percent of them were sexually assaulted.

It is reported that the main location of sexual harassment in Mexico is in the workplace, in which victims rarely file any complaints since there are no rules in place to address the problem and punish the aggressor. Another common location where sexual harassment occurs is on public transportation. A survey conducted by the National Institute of Statistics and Geography(INEGI) found that 96 percent of women in Mexico City have experienced some form of sexual harassment in a public space, and 58 percent have been groped. UN Women's Safe Cities program coordinator in Mexico, Yeliz Ozman, believes that while this is due to the problem of male entitlement in Mexico, it is made worse by the overcrowded public transportation system and when women have to work late night shifts. In 2016, the government of Mexico City started offering free rape whistles to women at public transportation hubs. They also provided women-only subway cars and pink buses to help protect women.

On February 26, 2020, twenty professors were fired from the four colleges of the Autonomous University of Mexico State for sexual harassment. As a response, there was a strike at nineteen schools of the National Autonomous University of Mexico (UNAM) to protest against sexual harassment and violence.

=== Domestic violence ===
A 2003 survey conducted by the National Institute of Statistics and Geography (INEGI) in Mexico found that 47 percent of women that are over 15 years old and in a relationship have experienced some form of domestic violence, and that 96 out of every 100 victims of domestic violence in Mexico are women. In 2016, INEGI found that 43.9 percent of women in a relationship have been attacked by their partner at some point. There are many different types of domestic violence that can occur, including emotional abuse, intimidation, physical abuse, and sexual abuse. A survey conducted by the National Institute for Women in Mexico (INMUJERES) found that 98.4 percent of all cases involving maltreatment of women include emotional abuse, 16 percent include intimidation, 15 percent include physical abuse, and 14 percent include sexual abuse. According to a 2006 survey in Mexico, 38.4 percent of married women suffer from emotional, physical, financial, or sexual abuse from their husbands. As of 2011, this rate has decreased slightly to 28.9 percent. More recently, Nadine Gasman, head of the National Institute for Women in Mexico (INMUJERES) reported in October 2019 that 267 women and girls were victims of violence every day in Mexico.

=== Violence against migrant women ===
There are tens of thousands of migrants going through Mexico from Central America and other countries on the journey to the United States. Most of these migrants are from El Salvador, Guatemala, Honduras, and Nicaragua. Migrants are at great risk for different kinds of violence as they make their journey, including kidnapping, threats and assaults. According to a human rights groups situated in Mexico, there are increasing numbers of women and girls attempting to migrate as well. Women and girls are at risk of being victims of sexual violence and sexual assault when they make their journey north. A report by Amnesty International estimates that 6 out of every 10 women migrating through Mexico may be a victim of sexual assault. Migrant women are at risk of sexual violence by gangs, human traffickers, other migrants, and corrupt officers. The risk of sexual assault and rape is so high for migrant women that smugglers, or coyotes, require them to get contraceptive injections before leaving their home country. It is hard for researchers to get statistics on violence against migrant women because these women are unable to report their assault cases out of fear of being deported. In addition, the existing stigma behind sexual violence may cause many of these sexual assaults to go unreported.

== Effects of COVID-19 on violence against women ==
On March 23, 2020 Mexico's stay at home orders went into full effect, disabling some women from escaping their abusive households. The following month of April became the deadliest reported month in the last five years in Mexico as 267 women were murdered. It is reported that more women died by murder in April than of COVID-19 (100 deaths). During the first four months of 2020, a total of 987 women were killed, and 308 of those cases were classified as femicides according to Mexico's Secretary of Security and Citizen Protection. Compared to the femicide rate in 2019, it was reported to have increased by 7.7% after the COVID-19 lock down was initiated. Additionally, reports of domestic violence increased in Mexico. UN Secretary-General, Antonio Guterres stated, "one negative repercussion of this isolation period has been the horrifying global surge in domestic violence". Over 260,000 domestic violence related calls were made to the Mexican police in 2020 compared to the 198,000 made in 2019. Linea de la Mujer, a domestic violence hotline in Mexico, also reported a 97% increase in calls received compared to the year before. Lastly, the number of women and children admitted to the 69 National Network of Shelter locations in Mexico, increased by 50% during the pandemic.

=== Government response ===
On May 15, 2020, Mexican president Andres Manual Lopez Obrador stated that 90% of calls made to domestic violence hotlines during the stay at home orders were false. Later that same month, the government previewed an anti domestic violence commercial, urging spouses to count to ten and to wave the "white flag of peace" when frustrated. After receiving criticism from the Mexican population, which urged the government to provide tangible resources for domestic violence victims, the collection of videos were removed from television commercials. In July 2020 Andres Manuel Lopez Obrador announced that the federal women's institute would receive a budget cut of 75%, an estimated 151 million pesos (US$7,537,752.92) after the pandemic crisis.

== Politics of gender-based violence in Mexico ==
=== International agreements and legislation ===
The Mexican government is part of various international efforts and agreements that aim to enhance the living standards of women and lower gender inequality within the country. First and foremost, they signed in favor of the Universal Declaration of Human Rights (UDHR) in 1948 which guarantees the fundamental rights of men and women equally. The Mexican State also became a part of the United Nations General Assembly (UNGA) Convention on the Elimination of All Forms of Discrimination against Women in 1979. In 1993 Mexico signed the first international document recognizing ‘gender violence’ as a type of violence, by the United Nations ‘The Declaration on the Elimination of Violence against Women’. Followed by the Bélem do Pará Convention agreement, signed in 1994 and promoted by the Inter-American Commission of Women (CIM), which criminalizes violence against women with an emphasis on sexual violence.

==== Convention on the Elimination of All Forms of Discrimination Against Women 2012 ====
The 2012 Convention on the Elimination of All Forms of Discrimination against Women showed its concern with the raising levels of insecurity and gender-based violence in the country:

“It is deeply concerned that the public security strategy to combat organized crime, combined with persistent impunity and corruption, have contributed to the intensification of already existing patterns of widespread discrimination and violence against women in the State party, rooted in patriarchal attitudes, and to the minimization and invisibility of this phenomenon. The Committee is concerned that women and girls have been subjected to increasing levels and different types of gender-based violence, such as domestic violence, forced disappearances, torture and murders, especially femicide, by state actors, including law enforcement officials and the security forces, as well as by non-state actors, such as organized crime groups.”

The Committee encouraged the Mexican State to prosecute and punish perpetrators of violence towards women. In addition, they urged Mexico to increase efforts and resources to improve public security, by providing a systematic training on gender-based violence to law enforcing actors and all other public security forces. They emphasized that the legislative inconsistencies at the state and municipal level should be tackled, including impunity and every other discriminatory penal and legal driven action or non-action. More over, they argued that appropriate monitoring and sanctions should be carried out to all law enforcing actors and judiciaries who acts against the interest of women's protection. Lastly, they stated that it was strictly necessary to collect consistent and veridical information on violence against women and to make gender-based violence a state primary issue.

==== General Law on Women's Access to a Life Free of Violence (2007) ====
The General Law on Women's Access to a Life Free of Violence (GLWALFV) was introduced the February 1, 2007 with the aim to prevent and eradicate gender-based violence, by combining the efforts among the Federation, Federal entities and municipalities. It established the regulations to guarantee Mexican women a life without violence, according to the constitutional principles of equality and justice. As well as to enforce a democracy to strengthen the sovereignty of the state and its laws. This law recognizes all the international treaties on Human Rights and gender-based violence that the Mexican state ratified.

The GLWALFV in point IV, Article 5 in Chapter I defines 'Violence against women' as: Any act or omission, based on their gender, that causes them psychological, physical, patrimonial, economic, sexual damage, suffering or death, in the private and the public matter. It recognizes 6 types of violence: psychological violence, physical violence, patrimonial violence, economic violence, sexual violence and any other analogous forms that harm the integrity or freedom of women. Furthermore, Article 21 of Chapter V recognizes 'Femicide violence' as: the extreme form of gender violence against women, produced by the violation of their human rights in the public and private spheres, produced by misogynistic behaviors that can lead to social and state impunity which can culminate in homicide and other forms of violent death of women.

Reports by Amnesty International have shown that this law has not been very effective due to poor implementation and a minimal change in police investigations following reports of different kinds of violence.

The first three chapters have been summarized.

Title I, Chapter I: General Dispositions

The first and foremost section of this law begins with the multiple definitions used throughout the bill and with establishing the focus and goal of eradicating gender violence in it its various, defined forms.

Articles 1-3 explicitly state that all levels of government are to work together to “prevent, sanction, and eradicate” the violence against women. These articles state that the “common sensical” preventative measures will be enacted to eradicate all types of violence against women. The Mexican government claims that the woman has inalienable human rights and that it will act to protect these rights.

Title II: Models of Violence

Chapter I: Violence in the Familial Environment

Articles 7-9 discuss the course of action to be taken in the case of domestic gender violence. It emphasizes that the state is responsible for providing free shelter, counselling, and any other services a survivor of domestic violence will need free of charge. It also explicitly denounces couples’ counselling as an acceptable approach. Also, familial violence and/or the failure for the aggressor to meet their obligations to feed and support children are grounds for losing custody of the children. it in encouraged to re- educate the aggressor with non-misogynistic views to prevent this.

Chapter II: On Labor and Faculty Violence

This following chapter focuses on the importance of classifying gender violence outside of the family environment. It addresses hierarchical roots and emphasizes sexual violence committed due to the nature of workplace hierarchies. The law here holds the Mexican government accountable for helping implement educational activities to curb violence in the workplace and in educational settings.

This section promotes the societal stigmatization of sexual violence to stop its normalization.

Chapter III: On Violence in the Community

This short, two-article section establishes the eradication of violence within communities (i.e. public places) as a task for the Mexican government. A brief outline of the steps necessary is included, one where the government is to:

i. Re-education of the public sans stereotypes and the expectation to keep the public informed about current risk levels for women in the area.

ii. The implementation of a monitoring system towards violent individuals and states of perceived societal violence.

iii. The establishment of a data bank on restraining orders and those they're placed on to facilitate the exchange of information between different governmental offices

==== Gender violence alert mechanism ====
One policy that has been put in place to increase response by local officials is the Gender Violence Alert Mechanism (Alerta de Violencia de Género contra las Mujeres). In this program, citizens may opt to receive a gender alert when violence against women is increasing in their municipality. This alert is the governments and security forces effort, at eradicating femicide violence in a specific area. It looks to guarantee women's security, lowering violence levels and eliminating inequalities by:

1. Establishing an institutional and multi-disciplinary group with a gender perspective that monitors the situation.
2. Implement preventive, security and justice actions to confront and reduce femicide violence .
3. Report on the area and the behavior of the indicators of gender-based violence.
4. Allocate the necessary budgetary resources to face the Gender Violence Alert Mechanism
5. Transparency on the causes that triggered the alert and the security conditions of the area where these measure have to be implemented

In the state of Mexico, the state with the highest population, the federal government found that its femicide rates were severe enough to issue an alert on gender violence on July 31, 2015. This was the first time the federal government released an alert. Since then, alerts have been released in Morelos, Michoacán, Chiapas, Nuevo León, Veracruz, Sinaloa, Colima, San Luis Potosí, Guerrero, Quintana Roo, and Nayarit. This alerting system has been reported as ineffective, since authorities view it as a punishment or a political attack. They choose to hide away from facing any repercussions rather than addressing the problem and making changes in ways to investigate violence against women cases.

One specific system that was implemented in order to support the monitoring and risk reduction for violence towards women was done through the Department of Transportation in Mexico City. INMUJERES worked alongside this agency to create the Viajemos Seguras program. This program started up in 2008 and created designated safe locations at subway stations where women could report sexual assault or a violent crime confidently and safely. This allowed for women to recover their sense of safety and confidence while traveling, as well as regaining the control over their safety when using public transport.

=== Invisibility, normalization and impunity ===
While there has been legislation over the last few decades attempting to decrease violence against women, they have proven to have had little effect due to a lack of enforcement by authorities and trust in the government. The absence in punishing delinquents is often referred to as "impunity".

In 2020, it was reported by the Institute for Economics & Peace that 92.4 percent of crimes in Mexico are either not reported to authorities or investigated by them. In 2016, Mexico received a 67.42 from a scale of 0–100, 0 being no impunity, placing it at 58th place out of the 59 countries that were examined in the Global Impunity Index. Specifically only 7% of crimes against women are further investigated after being reported. However, even after investigations are opened, suspect aggressors are rarely caught and taken before a judge. In 2018, Mexico's National Statistic and Geography Institute stated that out of the 1,058,052 cases that were opened for investigation only 58,228 suspects were forced to present themselves in court. One activist, Natalia Reyes, reported that only 8 percent of femicides in Mexico are punished. As a result, many female homicides continue to go unrecognized by authorities, as no action is taken to investigate the women's deaths.

With the lack of authoritative force in Mexicos' justice system, women and other members of the population have quit reporting cases overall. The National Institute of Statistics and Geography (INEGI), revealed that women refuse to report their case to authorities due to their lack of trust in the government, it being a waste of time, not having sufficient evidence, or out of fear of their abuser. Furthermore, Irene Tello Arista, executive director of Impunidad Cero, stated that this underreporting "has a lot to do with discrimination at the time of reporting. Women are treated with prejudices and stereotypes, the authorities ask them is they were drunk, if they had a relationship with the aggressor, if they are sure they want to report". With no trust in authorities to bring justice to victims, women have avoided contacting them for help. The Mexican government has recognized this underreporting phenomenon as la Cifra negra, the black figure.

In 2019 the National Survey on Urban Public Security (ENSU), unveiled that 77% of women reported feeling unsafe in Mexico, as an average of 11 women are killed every day. As a result, Alejandro Gertz Manero, Attorney General of Mexico, recommended in August 2020 that all murders involving women should be investigated as femicides. One of the most progressive actions taken by the SCJN was the incorporation of a gender perspective during trials and investigations related to female violence. In 2013, the framework on how this analytical method should be appropriately used during GBV cases was published by the SCJN.

== Activism and protest ==
In recent years, feminist groups have become more vocal with their critique towards police organizations and government figures. Specifically, these activists claim to be protesting against their ineffectiveness when handling cases of violence against women. As a result, feminist groups have established campaigns that aim to bring awareness to violence against women and femicides in Mexico. One of these campaigns traces back to the 1990s in Mexico in the case of Claudia Rodriguez Ferrando, where feminists in Mexico took to the streets to demand her release after she was arrested for killing her abuser in self-defense.

=== Claudia Rodriguez Ferrando ===
In 1996, in Mexico City, 30-year-old Claudia Rodríguez was assaulted by Juan Cabrera after a night out. When he attacked her in an empty metro station overpass, she shot him in self-defense. Cabrera later died, and Claudia was charged with first-degree murder, facing up to 10 years in prison. A New York Times article published during Claudia's trial highlighted that, for feminists in Mexico, her case was a test of whether their efforts to combat violence against women would bring about meaningful change. One of Claudia's most vocal advocates was Marta Lamas, a feminist who had spent 25 years fighting for women's rights. She drew attention to the double standard in Claudia's sentencing by comparing it to another case: just a week after Claudia's arrest, the chief of security for a news network, Juan Francisco Gortares Martínez—a former army captain—killed a robber who attempted to steal his watch. Within 48 hours, he was released, and the charges were dropped on the grounds of self-defense. Reflecting on this contrast, Marta Lamas stated, “That made a click in the minds of many women… We can't have a situation where a woman's physical integrity is worth less than a wristwatch”. The same New York Times article also reported that María Félix, a widely revered Mexican film star, went on television to call for public support to fight for Claudia Rodríguez.

A Reforma—one of Mexico's most influential newspapers—article from February 1997 reported that ten feminist organizations had "imprisoned" themselves in front of the Secretariat of the Interior, demanding Claudia's release after a year in jail. Around 5:30 p.m., protesters set up a wooden cage in downtown Mexico City. Patricia Mercado, a member of the support committee for Claudia, stated, "If Claudia is locked up in prison for defending herself from rape, then we are also imprisoning ourselves to tell the authorities that when we are sexually attacked, we will defend ourselves." Women stood together, chaining their hands and holding signs demanding her freedom. This protest took place on February 6, 1997. Just eleven days later, on February 17, 1997, Claudia Rodríguez was set free.

=== #Ni Una Más protest ===
The slogan Ni Una Más, Not Another One, has become widely used to signal that no other woman should be a victim of gender violence. Ni Una Más has appeared in the form of a hashtag on various social media platforms, as well as out in the streets in campaigns and protests. The hashtag #NiUnaMás has served as a place to diffuse information, encourage dialogue, and bring awareness to the assault that women and girls experience in Latin America. Women decided to organize these hashtags, slogans, and protests as a way to bring awareness to the harm and the issues that have been happening to women and children throughout Mexico as an average of 10 women are murdered every day and 4 children go missing.

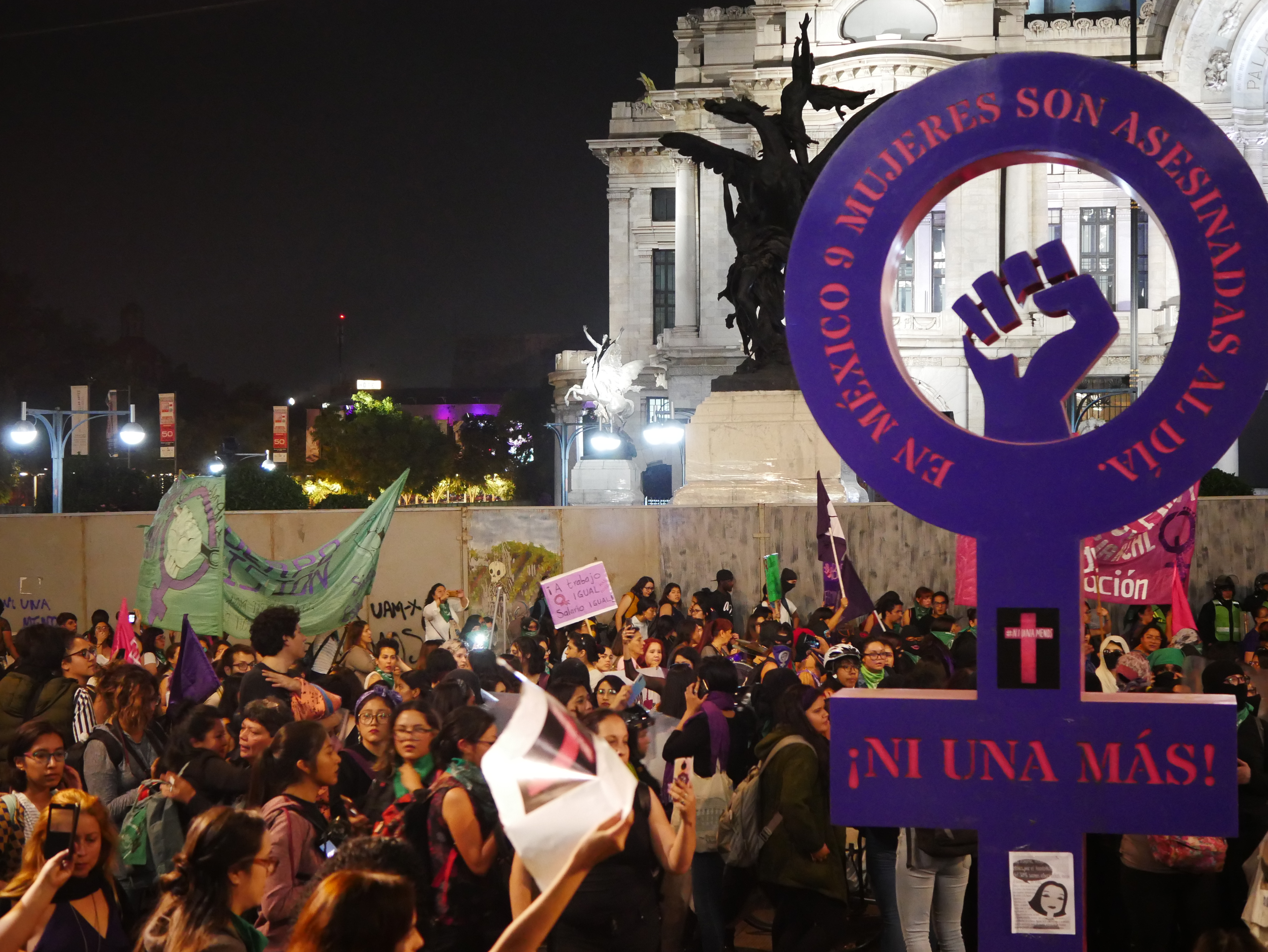
The 2019 Ni Una Más (Not Another One) protest held outside of the Palacio de Bellas Artes and the Antimonumenta, a feminist guerrilla sculpture.

=== Un Día Sin Mujeres protest ===
On March 8, 2020, on International Women's Day, women took to the streets and demanded that the government be held accountable for their inability to acknowledge gender violence as an issue. They demanded that murderers be held accountable for their crimes, and that awareness be brought to the sexual and physical harassment experienced by women on the daily. On the day of the protest, an estimated 80,000 people took part in Mexico City. The following day, Brujas del Mar, a group of women from Veracruz led the charge of another protest. On March 9, the protest was dubbed "Un Día Sin Mujeres" (A Day Without Women). The aim of this subsequent protest was to simulate a world in which women did not exist. The protest encouraged women to stay home and withdraw from activities that they would normally be involved in. Women stayed home from work, school, social media and refrained from making online purchases.

These protests were also intended to show government officials how frustrated women are with their inability to solve violence against women. President Andrés Manuel López Obrador(AMLO), had made promises to fix the issue, but has not respond to the increasing violence and deaths of women and girls. Some of the protests turned violent, in which AMLO responded by blaming the "neoliberal policies" of his predecessor and complaining about protesters graffiti on the National Palace.

==== Responses to protest ====
These protests received mixed support from those in government via social media. Female members in government such as Interior Minister Olga Sánchez Cordero, Claudia Sheinbaum, Mexico City's mayor, and others showed their support for the protest by using the hashtag #UnDiaSinMujeres or #UnDiaSinNosotras on social media. However, Beatriz Gutiérrez Müller the wife of Mexico's president, Andrés Manuel López Obrador, gave a mixed stance on the protests. She first joined the movement, but then later opposed the strike on social media by using the hashtag #NoAlParoNacional (No To The National Strike).

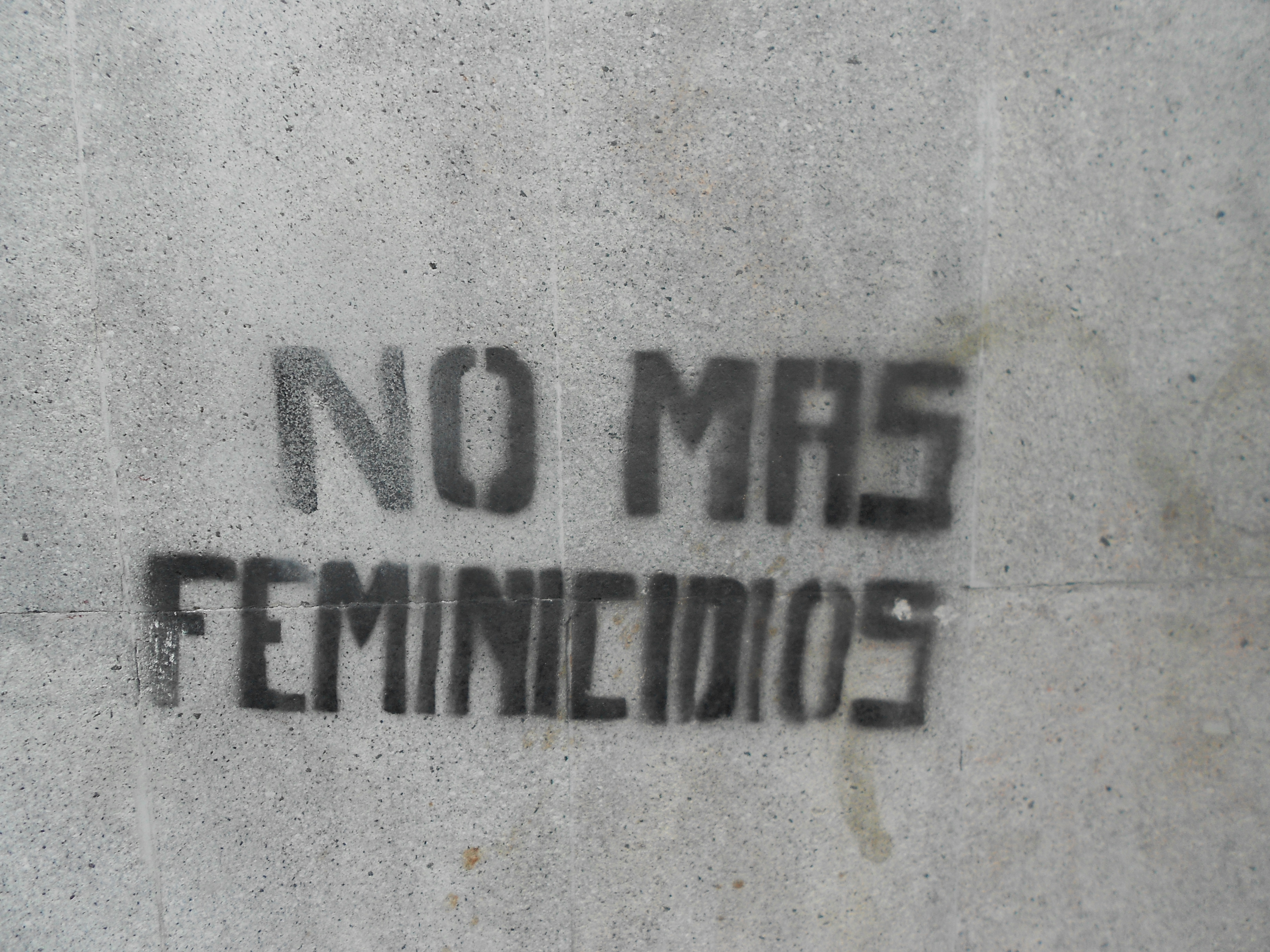
"No More Femicide" graffiti art

=== Art activism ===
Activists painted slogans on historically significant monuments, buildings, and paintings to advocate for women. This was done in an effort to demonstrate the governments overemphasis on inanimate objects, rather than on the lives of women and girls. These acts sparked a topic of conversation concerning the different values that are placed on humans and on monuments with patriotic ties. In addition, the UN Women, National Citizen Observatory on Femicide, and Católicas por el Derecho a Decidir opened the first permanent exhibition on femicides in Mexico in 2017; the exhibition is called "¡Ya basta!", which is located in the Museum of Memory and Tolerance in Mexico City.

=== Other organizations ===
A group in the city of Nezahualcoyotl called Nos Queremos Vivas has gathered for marches, and has also created self-defense workshops to help young girls protect themselves. In addition, there is an alliance of 47 different organizations in Mexico called the National Citizen Observatory on Femicide, which has called for more effective and complete investigations following missing or killed women, increasing accountability on part of the authorities in Mexico. This group is funded by the UN Trust to End Violence Against Women.

== Cultural references ==
=== In film ===
- The documentary, "Luchadoras" directed by Patrick Jasim and Paola Calvo examines the lives of three maquiladora workers who live in Ciudad Juarez. They avoid the dangers of femicide by engaging in female wrestling.

=== In television ===
- The television show "Narcos: Mexico", created by Carlos Bernard, Chris Brancato and Doug Miro, depicts a Juarez cop investigating the rise of femicide cases at the border in season 3.

=== In books ===
- The book "Each and Her" by Valerie Martinez, is a collection of poems focusing on the femicide cases of maquiladoras workers in Juarez as well as on the suffering experienced by victims' family members.

== See also ==
- Crime and violence in Latin America
- Crime in Mexico
- Domestic violence
- Femicide
- Femicide in Latin America
- Feminism in Mexico
- Fourth Transformation
- Human rights in Mexico
- Human trafficking in Mexico
- Sexual violence
- UN Women
- Violence against women
- Violence and Activism at the Border (2008)
- Women in Mexico
- Women's rights
