= Martha Givaudan =

Martha Edith Givaudan Moreno (born 28 September 1956, Mexico City) is the Executive Director of the Mexican Institute for Family and Population Research (Instituto Mexicano de Investigación de Familia y Población, abbreviated as IMIFAP and known popularly as Yo quiero Yo puedo) https://yoquieroyopuedo.org.mx, and a member of the National System of Researchers. She is a clinical and social psychologist and she has been certified as an EMDR (eye movement desensitization and reprocessing) therapist for post-traumatic stress disorder (PTSD).

== Education ==
She earned her Bachelor's in Psychology in 1979 from National Autonomous University of Mexico and later earned her Master's there in 1993. In 2003, she earned her Ph.D. in Research and Evaluation of Health Prevention Programs from Tilburg University. Since then, she has continued her research in psychology through her work at Yo quiero Yo puedo, studying the effects of psychosocial barriers on the decisions and actions of individuals from marginalized communities in Mexico and beyond.

== Career ==
Givaudan began her career at the National Institute of Perinatology, researching neonatal behavior (1980). In 1989, she began working at the Mexican Institute for Family and Population Research (Yo quiero Yo Puedo). The programs she has participated in creating, implementing, and evaluating throughout the years focus on building life skills while providing key thematic knowledge and reducing barriers to change, across a variety of topics pertaining to the daily challenges of life in low-income settings. Such topics include: health care topics (including alcohol and substance abuse prevention, healthy eating and hygiene practices, diabetes prevention, reproductive rights, breast and cervical cancer prevention, coping with depression, overcoming partner violence, and new mother and infant health), productivity topics (such as developing a culture of savings, commercialization of products, creating a small business), citizenship topics (such as human rights and gender equality, NGO professionalization, civic engagement in the community, violence, and parental responsibility), and education topics (such as sexuality, alcohol and substance abuse prevention, hygiene and health, violence and bullying as well as education in finances, civics and ethics, and talent development). Givaudan has written and published over 50 educational materials as part of the Yo Quiero, Yo Puedo programming. The text book "Civics and ethics training" has been distributed at the national level.

As a certified therapist for individuals with post-traumatic stress disorder, she has contributed to many research projects in this field. Her most recent publication for the Journal of EMDR Practice and Research reported the findings from a randomized control trial that tested the effects of different psychological and pharmacological treatments on adult PTSD patients.

== Awards and honors ==
Givaudan is a member of the National System of Researchers. She is also a member of the executive board for the International Association of Applied Psychology.

In 2007, Givaudan received the “Distinguished International Psychologist Award” from the American Psychiatric Association; she was thus featured in their magazine for her most recently developed project with IMIFAP (Yo quiero Yo puedo), a program to reduce diabetes on Mexico's border. Through the program, health care clinicians in the region were trained to more effectively impact the local communities´ nutrition and exercise habits and support them in building the skills needed for stress management and decision making. The organization estimated that 5,000 at-risk adults were reached through their efforts.

In 2010, Givaudan received the Mentor International Prevention Award from Queen Silvia of Sweden's Mentor Foundation. The award recognized IMIFAP's (Yo quiero Yo puedo's) program for “Drug Prevention through Life Skills, Academic Achievement, and School Enrollment”
