= Staudt (surname) =

Staudt is a surname. Notable people with the surname include:

- Erwin Staudt (born 1948), German businessman and football manager
- Herman R. Staudt (born 1926), American government official
- Johann Bernhard Staudt (1654–1712), Austrian Jesuit composer
- Karl Georg Christian von Staudt (1798–1867), German mathematician
- Kathleen Staudt (born 1946), American political scientist
- Linda Staudt (born 1958), Canadian long-distance runner
- Louis M. Staudt (born 1955), American cancer researcher
- Nancy Staudt (born 1963), American law school dean
- Virginia Staudt Sexton (1916–1997), American psychologist
