= Murder of Ingrid Escamilla =

2020 murder in Mexico City

Killing of Ingrid Escamilla
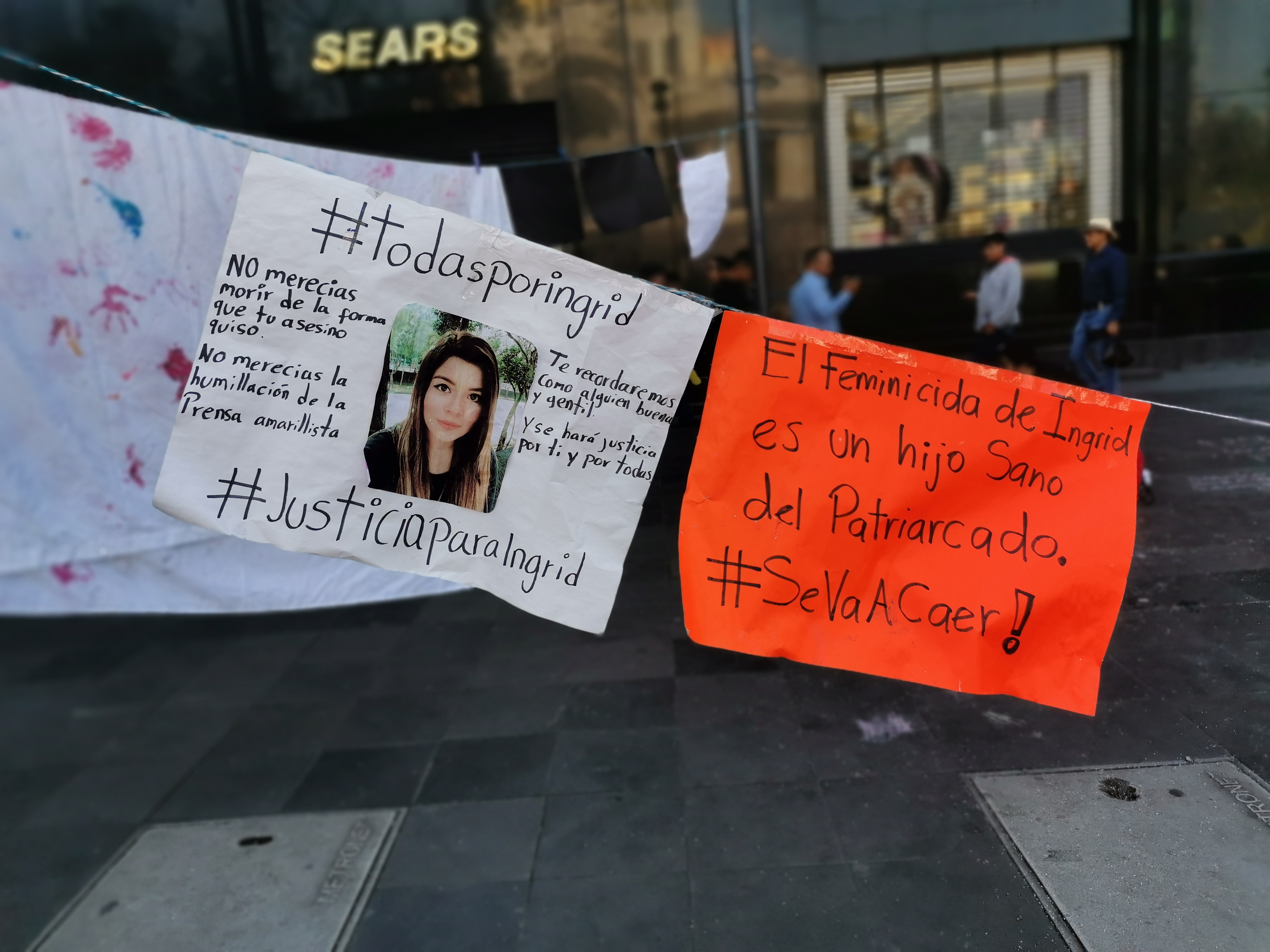
- Signs protesting the murder of Ingrid Escamilla in Mexico City
- Location: Gustavo A. Madero, Mexico City, Mexico
- Date: 9 February 2020
- Attack type: Femicide
- Victim: Ingrid Escamilla Vargas
- Perpetrator: Erik Francisco Robledo Rosas
- Verdict: Guilty
- Convictions: Femicide
- Sentence: 70 years in prison

On 9 February 2020, Ingrid Escamilla Vargas, a 25-year-old woman living in Gustavo A. Madero, Mexico City, was murdered by her boyfriend, Erik Francisco Robledo Rosas in an act of femicide. Robledo was convicted and sentenced to the maximum penalty of 70 years in prison.

The Mexican public was outraged by both the brutality with which the murder was perpetrated and by the subsequent spreading of images of the victim's body in the press and on social media.

== Background ==
Mexico has the second highest rate of femicides within Latin America, with an average of 10.5 femicides committed every day. Femicides are most prevalent in the states of Veracruz, State of Mexico, Nuevo León, Puebla, and Mexico City. Of these crimes, 3% are criminally investigated and 1% of perpetrators are convicted.

Ingrid Escamilla Vargas (born c. 1995) was a 25-year-old woman originally from Puebla. She received a master's degree in tourism business administration. Her boyfriend was Erick Francisco Robledo Rosas, 46, who worked as a civil engineer. Both lived in a home in the Vallejo neighborhood of Gustavo A. Madero in the north of Mexico City and had been in a relationship for five years. Previously, the ex-wife of Robledo Rosas had filed a complaint against him alleging domestic violence.

== Murder ==
The crime against Ingrid Escamilla occurred after an argument in which Robledo Rosas went into a rage when questioned for drinking alcohol, which triggered a fight in which he received several slashes. Robledo Rosas stabbed Escamilla in the neck multiple times, killing her, then removed her skin and various organs which he then tried to flush down the toilet of his house. When he did not succeed, Robledo Rosas wrapped the remains in a green bag and left his home in order to discard it on the side of the street.

Robledo Rosas's son, who reportedly has autism, reportedly witnessed the murder. Robledo Rosas called the child's mother, his ex-wife, to confess that he had killed his partner. The ex-wife called the police, who found Robledo Rosas next to the body of Escamilla. Robledo Rosas was arrested by police and consigned to a public ministry. Videos on social media showed Robledo Rosas under arrest in a patrol car with bloodied clothes and confessing to the crime in detail.

Escamilla's body was handed over to her relatives on 10 February and buried on 11 February in the cemetery of the municipality of Juan Galindo, where the victim was originally from. Before being buried, Escamilla was given a lying in state in the municipal presidency of Juan Galindo, from where she was a collaborator. The funeral was attended by about 300 people who demanded justice.

On 12 February 2020, a judge based in Mexico City found elements of guilt in the investigation provided by the Attorney General of Mexico City (FGJCDMX), for which Robledo Rosas was imprisoned preventively. After Robledo Rosas announced in his preliminary hearing that he would commit suicide, he was ordered to carry out a psychological assessment at the Men's Center for Psychosocial Rehabilitation of the South Preventive Prison for Men in Mexico City.

== Distribution of images ==
On 10 February 2020, the headlines of the sensationalist tabloids ¡Pásala! and La Prensa published detailed accounts of the murder, prominently displaying graphic photographs of the victim's body as it was found by first responders to the scene,. Likewise, the images found their way and were disseminated on social networks such as Twitter and Facebook, causing outrage and triggering a national debate about the role of the media in the normalization of violence against women, citing the lack of a gendered perspective, and structural, entrenched cultural norms in the media industry as driving factors. According to experts, this social phenomenon distorted the prosecution of crimes and their qualification as femicides.

The Mayor of Mexico City, Claudia Sheinbaum, announced that the distribution of the images would be sanctioned. In response, an internal investigation on six public servants who may have leaked the photographs of Escamilla was opened. The prosecutor of Mexico City, Ernestina Godoy Ramos, supported Sheinbaum and described the leak as an offense not only to the victim and her family but "to society." She also announced the proposal of a specific law that would punish the distribution of images of crime victims by public officials. Prior to this crime, there was a recommendation by the Human Rights Commission of Mexico City to encourage authorities to respond to the image leaks of the victims in a homicide in Colonia Narvarte. The claim was supported by the Undersecretariat of Human Rights of Mexico City, part of the capital administration.

On February 12, social media users on Twitter and Facebook began a campaign to upload photographs unrelated to the crime while mentioning the name of the victim in an effort to displace the leaked images from search results and to honor the victim's memory.

On February 14, the newspaper La Prensa published a letter on its front cover where it responded to the criticism. La Prensa's director, Luis Carriles, indicated that the newspaper complied with all the protocols in force about the treatment of femicides.

== Reactions ==
The Mayor of Mexico City Claudia Sheinbaum condemned the events and expressed her solidarity with the families of the victim.

The National Commission to Prevent and Eradicate Violence against Women in Mexico requested sanctions for those who distributed images of the body of Ingrid and requested that those who carry out work on these facts duly comply with the Ley General de Acceso de las Mujeres a una Vida Libre de Violencia General ("Law on Women's Access to a Life Free of Violence").

On February 14, demonstrations and protests were held in at least ten Mexican states in memory of Ingrid Escamilla. In Mexico City, protesters went to the offices of the newspaper La Prensa to protest the publication of the victim's images. Some of them set fire to a vehicle owned by the newspaper.

On February 16, feminist groups organized a march that reached the outskirts of Ingrid Escamilla's home, where they held a protest and placed an offering in memory of the victim. There, her relatives asked the media for respect and dignified treatment. "Every time they are going to publish a photo, when they are going to write a line, think, think about it a bit, make it a clean communication, one that is not yellow," said Victoria Barrios, Ingrid's aunt.

Civil society organizations, activists and researchers published an open letter directed at the media against gender-based violence. "We express our total rejection of the exhibition of the bodies of victims in social media and online networks. In no case is it justifiable. The act of these newspapers in making photos and videos go viral is irresponsible, inhuman and revictimizes Ingrid and her family, in addition to perpetuating violence against women", the letter expressed.

The Office of the United Nations High Commissioner for Human Rights condemned the crime and the subsequent dissemination of photographs.

The human rights organization Article 19 condemned the leak of the images "since they contravene the protocols of action in the investigation of femicides and international human rights standards. Therefore, these actions by FGJCDMX personnel are a violation of human rights of victims and women".

The Archdiocese of Mexico called on the Mexican authorities to provide justice in this case and requested that the crime not go unpunished.

== See also ==
- Murder of Fátima Cecilia
