= Mexican Institute for Family and Population Research =

Mexican Institute of Family and Population Research
- Formation: 1985
- Location: Mexico City, Mexico
- President: Susan Pick
- Key people: Martha Givaudan
- Website: www.yoquieroyopuedo.org.mx

IMIFAP - Yo Quiero, Yo Puedo (el Instituto Mexicano de Investigación de Familia y Población, or the Mexican Institute for Family and Population Research) is a non-governmental organization headquartered in Mexico City, Mexico. IMIFAP—Yo Quiero, Yo Puedo's central mission is to facilitate the development of life skills and knowledge through a reduction of psychosocial barriers so that people in marginalized Mexican communities might reach their full potential and become agents of change in their own lives and in their communities. IMIFAP (Yo Quiero, Yo Puedo)’s programs address a wide variety of issues in the fields of health, education, productivity, and citizenship; however each program is based on FrEE (Framework for Enabling Empowerment), “a model that emphasizes the importance of psychosocial factors and the individual in accessing freedoms and promoting health, productivity, and sustainable human development”.

Their most recent program being administered in Chiapas and Hidalgo, Mexico is entitled “Yo Quiero, Yo Puedo… tener éxito en la escuela” (“I want to I can…be successful in school”). Others that the organization have been carrying out include “Yo Quiero, Yo Puedo… prevenir embarazos” (“I want to I can…prevent pregnancies”), “Yo Quiero, Yo Puedo… prevenir violencia” (“I want to I can…prevent violence”), “Yo Quiero, Yo Puedo… cuidar mi salud y ejercer mis derechos” (“I want to I can…take care of my health and exercise my rights”) and “Yo Quiero, Yo Puedo… empezar mi negocio” (“I want to I can…start my own business”).

== History ==
=== Establishment ===
IMIFAP (Yo Quiero, Yo Puedo) was founded in 1985 by a group of social psychologists, led by Dr. Susan Pick. The first program that the organization developed sought to improve sexuality education for women by equipping them with life skills they needed to tear down the psychosocial barriers hindering them from proper accession to health care facilities, personnel, and tools such as contraceptives. In Dr. Pick's doctoral research, she had discovered that although many of the women in the communities located on the outskirts of Mexico City liked the idea of family planning, they lacked the possibility to use contraception for several reasons: they did not know how to use or access it, feared social scrutiny, or believed they did not have the right to make these decisions in regards to their health. There seemed to be an inherent belief amongst participants that things in life happened to them and that they had little to no control. Dr. Pick, in an initial phase of evaluation, interviewed many women who commonly used phrases such as “If God wants it,” “I can't work because my husband would not like that, it is better for me to wait,” or “I shouldn't ask, it is better if I remain quiet.”. Thus, IMIFAP (Yo Quiero, Yo Puedo)’s first project to redesign the traditional sexuality education model incorporated FrEE, a methodology that promotes the breakdown of psychosocial barriers in order to promote an individual's power to choose and commit to personal changes, ultimately leading to a sustainable form of human development as individuals gain the skills to drive change for themselves rather than wait for an outside power to make changes for them. Under this methodology, the first program helped the women to develop intrinsic motivation and a sense of empowerment, life skills that built up the women's perceptions of themselves and their abilities to form their futures so that, combined with the sexuality education lessons, the program sustainably improved the health care situation in the region. Post-program analysis showed that after receiving IMIFAP (Yo Quiero, Yo Puedo)’s programming, the women not only knew more about the biology behind sex but also reported greater interest in using contraception and visiting the local health clinic. By 1987, IMIFAP (Yo Quiero, Yo Puedo) had adapted this model for adolescents, acknowledging that the belief that one has “no control” begins at an early age and that children are least equipped with the knowledge to make positive decisions when it comes to their sexual health. Therefore, IMIFAP (Yo Quiero, Yo Puedo) published a series of manuals and textbooks on sexuality education for children and adolescents, including its first training manual “Planning Your Life”. Later in 1988, they launched their first national program by the same name with the approval of the Secretary of Education at the time, Manuel Bartlett. The national campaign consisted originally of a small workshop in Querétaro, Mexico with a group of teachers, representing all of the states in Mexico. IMIFAP (Yo Quiero, Yo Puedo) sold over half a million copies of their sexuality education textbooks and materials. They continued their campaign by developing a short soap opera called “Talk to me about ‘That’” with support from the newly elected Secretary of Education, Ernesto Zedillo. In 1991, “Planning your Life” was adopted officially into the public education system under the title “Adolescence and Development.”

=== Current Projects ===
IMIFAP (Yo Quiero, Yo Puedo) focuses on the creation and implementation of programs that encourage participants to develop an intrinsic sense of responsibility and power in order to exercise control over their own lives. After the success of their first program on sexuality education, IMIFAP (Yo Quiero, Yo Puedo) expanded to include programs in four main areas: health, citizenship, productivity, and education. All four center around the concept that knowledge plus life skills minus psychosocial barriers lead to changes in behaviors to form agents of change, reduce risk factors in context, improve gender equality, and increase opportunities for development.

Education

The school-based programs are centered on life skills and empowerment for parents, teachers that live and coexist with the children, pre-teens, and adolescents from preschool through 9th grade. These programs include topics such as improving academic performance and the classroom environment, and school for mom and dad. For example, such programs help parents of children under 12 years of age and adolescents to assess their role in their children's lives and support the personal growth of each family member. All education programs have the objective of supporting communication, identifying and expression emotions, and establishing and enforcing limits, such as fortifying necessary protective factors that prevent problems such as drug use and alcohol abuse, obesity and unwanted pregnancies, all directed toward the personal development of teachers and parents and the basis for raising healthy, responsible children, capable of taking control of their lives. The organization has taken an active role in the campaign for educational reform in Mexico, launching a national campaign “Presente Maestro!” in the spring of 2013. The campaign was designed to raise awareness to the issues currently facing students and the new reform measures being made by the Mexican government to improve the current system of teaching.

Examples of educational programs: “Hygiene, Health, and a Healthy Environment,” “Nutrition,” “Tobacco, drug and alcohol use prevention,” “Sexual and reproductive health and rights,” “Civic and Ethics Formation,” “Financial Education,” “Violence and Bullying,” and “Developing Talents.”

Health

The health programs seek to help develop skills and knowledge so that individuals can make and implement autonomous and informed decisions regarding their physical and mental health. Programs are implemented by community health personal in clinics and activities in the community.

Program topics include: “Quality of Personal Attention to Health”, “Prevention of Cervical and Breast Cancer,” “Maternal and Infant Health and Cognitive Development,” “Early detection of Depression,” and “Nutrition and Prevention of Diabetes and ECV.”

Citizenship

IMIFAP (Yo Quiero, Yo Puedo)’s programs in citizenship help develop participatory citizens, responsible for their decisions and the consequences of their actions. The programs promote critical and analytical thinking so that participants are capable of achieving a better future based in reasoned and conscientious decisions. Topics include civics and ethics training, democracy, prevention of different types of violence, and values training.

Programs in citizenship cover topics such as: “Human Rights and Gender Equality,” “Citizen Participation and Professionalization of OCS's,” “Civic Formation in the Community,” and “Social Violence”.

Productivity

The newest pillar to the organization, the productivity programs provide practical skills necessary for saving, starting businesses, sales, small loans, commercialization and forming partnership arrangements. The participants organize themselves into community banks and pay back their loans with interest on monthly payments. Within the first year after receiving loans, IMIFAP (Yo Quiero, Yo Puedo) offers accompaniment services to community banks. Additionally, the productivity programs include a financial education program for schools.

Productivity topics include: “A Culture of Savings,” “Commercialization,” “Starting my own business”, “Sales”, and “Creation of Micro-Businesses”.

To date, IMIFAP (Yo Quiero, Yo Puedo) has launched over 40 programs in 14 different countries throughout Latin America and worldwide through funding from over 300 private and public companies, institutes, and organization (both national and international) such as the Walmart Foundation, MetLife Foundation, MacArthur Foundation, Dow Chemical, World Bank, World Health Organization, ADO, Alcatel-Lucent, ING-Sura, Merck Sharp & Dohme, Buffett, Kellogg, Mentor International, and the United Nations among many others. IMIFAP (Yo Quiero, Yo Puedo) also partners with government programs and ministries in and outside of Mexico like the Ministry of Health (Secretaría de Salud), the Ministry of Public Education (Secretaría de Educación Pública, or SEP) and the National Science and Technology Council (CONACyT).

As of today, under the leadership of President Dr. Susan Pick and Vice President Dr. Martha Givaudan, IMIFAP (Yo Quiero, Yo Puedo) has 20 million beneficiaries with over 14 million people receiving programming in sexuality education and 3 million more participating in other health related topics such as obesity or substance abuse prevention. The integrated health programs that include hygiene, nutrition, and sexual health have shown improvements of 20% in hygiene behaviors around food preparation, 10% in hygiene behaviors around the household, 19% knowledge about nutrition, and 17% in receiving pap smears and forming support groups for early detection of cancer. In addition, educational programming has decreased school dropout by 24%, helped 16,000 parents in improving the relationship with their children, and has increased parent participation in their children's schools by 26%. Violence prevention programming has also benefited 250,000 people and has increased teachers’ knowledge about different types of violence by 27%.

== Methodology ==
=== Theoretical Foundation ===
IMIFAP (Yo Quiero, Yo Puedo) makes Nobel Laureate in Economics, Dr. Amartya Sen, “Human Capabilities Approach” operational from a psychosocial perspective. Although his philosophy is economically focused and has contributed primarily to the understanding of social indicators as tools to evaluate development economics, it has also been useful for non-profit agencies that seek to make significant differences at the local level in developing communities. First, Dr. Sen defines an “agent” as “someone who acts and brings about change, and whose achievements can be judged in terms of her own values and objectives, whether or not we assess them in terms of some external criteria as well”. In this way, to have personal agency means to have the ability to make and act upon one's own decisions that lead to a self-defined version of success.

According to Dr. Sen's “Capabilities” framework, communities can be considered well developed if individuals possess the capabilities to make positive behavioral changes (doings) that benefit their own well-being (functionings) and that of their community, and a positive behavior change that leads to human development is defined as one that allows that individual to become an agent of change. According to this theory, projects designed to improve human development are only sustainable so long as its recipients are able and choose to make both informed and internally motivated decisions. For example, a project to reduce cervical cancer through providing Pap smear screenings is only successful if, upon completion, the project has successfully instilled a desire and habit amongst individuals in that community to regularly visit the local clinic for a screening.

=== FrEE-Framework for Enabling Empowerment ===
FrEE (Framework for Enabling Empowerment) is the official methodology utilized by IMIFAP (Yo Quiero, Yo Puedo). In 2010, Pick and health services researcher Jenna Sirkin officially published the FrEE theoretical framework in the first edition of their book, Breaking the Poverty Cycle: A Human Basis for Sustainable Development. The framework adapts Sen's Capabilities Approach to make it operative for community development program.

The FrEE framework is based on the following principles: • People need to understand and experience the ways in which they can overcome psychological and social barriers. Through this awareness, they become contributors of their own growth process, as well as the social, economic, and political development of their communities. • To exercise increased choice in various domains, people need to have, and feel they have, the competencies and knowledge not only to serve but also to demand rights and services. • Through the development of core competencies and the opportunities for reducing psychosocial barriers, individual needs are connected to newly acquired competencies and opportunities. • People first begin to change behaviors in a few concrete situations and can subsequently expand their learning into new domains. This expansion develops through success in specific situations and a growing sense of personal agency. • As people's competencies are enhanced, they are able to create new contents where choices are more likely to be made, actualized, and sustained. • Maintenance of personal change is necessary for sustainability of development.

== Controversy ==
In 1988, during the phase of scaling up their first program, Planeando tu vida (Planning your Life), to the national level, IMIFAP (Yo Quiero, Yo Puedo) faced strong opposition from a few small, yet influential, conservative groups in Mexico, namely the National Union of Parents (UNPF) and Mexican Family (FAME). These groups argued that IMIFAP, in providing sexuality education programs that addressed the topics of contraceptives, masturbation, and homosexuality, was “ignoring universal values of Catholicism and promoting libertarianism”. They pressured the government at the time not to adopt IMIFAP (Yo Quiero, Yo Puedo)’s model for sexuality education and, in 1991, paid for advertisements, in national newspapers and other forms of media, that denounced such plans to adopt the IMIFAP (Yo Quiero, Yo Puedo) sexuality education model and texts. As a result, IMIFAP (Yo Quiero, Yo Puedo) made compromises and adjusted their programing so that the program version used on the national level no longer included portions on masturbation and homosexuality. Ultimately, IMIFAP (Yo Quiero, Yo Puedo) agreed that it was better to see their program adapted for implementation rather than rejected altogether.

Finally, while IMIFAP (Yo Quiero, Yo Puedo) does not still experience opposition to any of their programs, they sometimes encounter resistance or hesitation to participate from certain community members due to pressures from sociocultural norms and fears of interruption to the status quo.

== Awards and recognition ==
In 2000, Queen Silvia of Sweden presented IMIFAP with an award for its ““I want to, I can … prevent substance abuse” program. Ten years later in 2010, the Mentor Foundation, headed by Queen Silvia, presented IMIFAP with a second, the Mentor National Partners Award for its “Drug Prevention through Life Skills, Academic Achievement, and School Enrollment” program, along with the Panamanian White Cross. That same year in 2010, IMIFAP was a finalist for the UBS Visionaris Social Entrepreneurship Award as well as for The Schwab Foundation's contest for the “Best Social Entrepreneurship of the Year”. In March 2011, IMIFAP was awarded the Inter-American Development Bank's Juscelino Kubitschek Award for the “Social, Cultural and Scientific” category, a distinction for organizations “carrying out sustainable projects with a proven impact on social and economic development in Latin America and the Caribbean.”
