= Murder of Fátima Cecilia =

2020 child murder in Mexico

On 11 February 2020, Fátima Cecilia, a seven-year-old girl, disappeared, and four days later, on 15 February, was found dead in a garbage bag in a vacant lot in Tláhuac, Mexico City, Mexico with signs of physical violence and sexual abuse. The murder of Fátima has caused commotion in Mexico.

== Events ==
=== Disappearance ===
Fátima Cecilia Aldrighetti Anton (7 January 2013 – 15 February 2020) was in the first year of primary school at the Enrique C. Rébsamen School in Xochimilco, Mexico City, Mexico. On 11 February, Fátima's mother was late to pick her up after school, and Fátima was left unsupervised on a sidewalk outside of the school. Fátima was last seen on video surveillance being picked up by a woman wearing a striped sweater and skirt and taken along Ignacio Zaragoza Street in the Santiago Tulyehualco neighborhood.

The next day, her family reported Fátima missing to the Deconcentrated Prosecutor's Office of Tláhuac. They were channeled to FIPEDE in Azcapotzalo, where the investigation was started and an Amber alert was issued.

On 15 February, the Preventive Staff of the Ministry of Public Safety found the body of the girl. It was located in a plastic bag and showed signs of physical violence and sexual abuse. From that moment on, a criminal investigation with the aggravating charge of femicide began.

=== Autopsy ===
On 19 February, the General Attorney of Mexico City, Ernestina Godoy Ramos, told the press that the child had been tortured and raped after an autopsy performed by the Institute of Forensic Sciences (Incifo).

=== Capture of suspects ===
On the night of 19 February 2020, the alleged kidnappers and murderers of Fátima, Mario Reyes and Giovana Cruz, who were in the Isidro Fabela municipality of the State of Mexico, were arrested. Three people alerted elements of the National Guard who knew where the people they were looking for were, because photographs had been disseminated through the media so that the population could participate in the identification of the alleged perpetrators.

== Reactions ==
During the session on 18 February, the Chamber of Deputies kept a minute of silence for the death of Fátima. That day the Chamber of Deputies approved an increase in penalties for feminicide after the murder of Fátima Cecilia; in the case of sexual abuse of minors, the sentence of 10 years in prison increased to 18 years.

Social groups against gender violence called for a national women's strike on 9 March 2020 under the slogan "¡El nueve ninguna se mueve!" ("On the ninth [day] no one [woman] moves!"). The groups also protest the increase of feminicides in the country per year. In 2020, it is estimated that 10 women are killed every day in Mexico; by 23 February, 265 women had been killed in Mexico. In 2019, 1009 feminicides were registered in the country, an increase of 10% compared to the 891 cases of 2018. A little more than a week before the disappearance of Fátima, the murder of Ingrid Escamilla, a 25-year-old woman, and the dissemination of the photos of her body had also generated a wave of indignation in the country.
