= Susan Pick =

Mexican psychologist

Susan Pick is a Mexican social psychologist and the founder and board president of the Mexican Institute for Family and Population Research (IMIFAP) (commonly known as "Yo quiero Yo puedo"), a Mexican organization that has promoted and facilitated wellbeing for over 21 million people in Mexico and 17 other countries through over 60 education, health and poverty reduction programs. She has her Ph.D. in social psychology from the University of London.

For her dissertation, she studied rural Mexico and the way in which social and cultural norms effected decision making and subsequent actions of women there. This research inspired the mission of Yo quiero Yo puedo and led to further investigations into the social barriers that prevent human change and development. Her work is based on three of her teachers and mentors: Robert S. Hartman (theory of value), Martin Fishbein (behavior change) and Nobel laureate Amartya Sen (human capabilities) with whom she studied.

Among the largest funders of the research and programs developed, implemented and evaluated by Pick's group are: Buffet Foundation, European Union, Inter-American Development Bank, GlaxoSmithKline, MacArthur Foundation, National Institutes of Health, Packard Foundation, Population Council, Summit Foundation, Tinker Foundation, United Nations, Bernard van Leer Foundation, World Bank and World Health Organization.

Examples of the impact of Yo quiero Yo puedo programs include:

- Statistically significant reductions in: elementary to secondary school drop-out, number of mistakes in the manufacturing of textiles, acceptance of child marriage, SIDS, unprotected sex among adolescents, acceptance of violence as normative, anxiety levels among recent medical school graduates.
- Statistically significant increases in (all in highly marginalized communities): reported frequency and quality of parent/child communications on difficult subjects, use of Pap smears among adult women, personal hygiene, introduction of healthy nutrition practices, use of critical analysis, use of early stimulation with children, exclusive breastfeeding, work satisfaction, use of latrines, boiling of water, washing of vegetables, uptake of vaccines, identification of violent behaviors, and savings practices.

Pick is co-author (with Jenna Sirkin) of Breaking the Poverty Cycle: The Human Basis for Sustainable Development (Oxford University Press), which details her studies and her subsequent theory for social change, FrEE (Framework for Enabling Empowerment).

The Framework for Enabling Intrinsic Empowerment

FrEE stands for Framework for Enabling Intrinic Empowerment. FrEE makes Nobel Prize Laureate Amartya Sen´s Human Capabilities Approach operative from a psychosocial perspective. The capabilities that lead to changes in behaviors (“Doings” in Sen´s terms) are:

1. knowledge (e.g. beliefs and facts regarding nutrition, hygiene, prevention and early detection of health issues, civic education, prevention of school desertion),
2. cognitive, emotional, and social life skills (e.g. decision making, assertive communication, conflict resolution, empathy, self knowledge, management of emotions, critical thought), and
3. reduction of psychosocial barriers (e.g. shame, fear, guilt, prejudice, resentment).

Behaviors change in stages (taken from Prochaska and DiClemente´s Theory of Behavior Change), going from precontemplating change to contemplating it, preparing for action, the action itself, and finally the maintenance of change. As behaviors start to take place, the sense of personal agency becomes increasingly enhanced. As this process evolves, so does a change at a more stable level, namely in the person her or himself (Sen´s “Being functionings”). As the person evolves from being a mere subject of change to being more and more an agent of change, the empowerment felt is one that comes from within the person (Intrinsic Empowerment). It is through these stable changes in the person that the context within which the individual lives, gets impacted. And therefore the prevalent social norms undergo a change leading to expanded individual and collective freedoms and capabilities.

Professor Pick has over 400 publications, the most recent one being “Pinta fuera de la raya: La importancia de saber desobedecer” (“Color outside the lines: The importance of knowing how to disobey”).

In 2016, Susan moved into a role as President of the advisory board of Yo quiero Yo puedo. Yo quiero Yo puedo has been responsible for the development of six national programs in Mexico, namely: a) sexuality education and prevention of unwanted pregnancies, b) school based HIV prevention, c) training and ethics for first through third grade of secondary school, d) breast feeding and early stimulation, d) nutrition of the 300,000 poorest homes, e) prevention of school based violence, and f) quality of care provided by recent graduates from the public medical schools.

Most recently, Professor Pick has been involved in the study of psychedelic psychotherapies and the difference they make to many mental health issues. Her focus is coaching for the establishment of an intention before a psychedelic trip and follow up integration thereafter.

== Background ==
Susan Pick was born and raised in Mexico City, Mexico to Jewish German refugee parents who had fled the country just before World War II. Pick claims her childhood brought into question for her some of the differences between the social mindset of her European family and that of her Mexican peers. Specifically, she repeatedly saw her father throw pens and papers on the floor and say “Why on earth do people say 'It fell' instead of taking control and responsibility by saying 'I dropped it and am responsible for picking it up'?" It was these observations, together with attending courses with axiology Professor Robert S. Hartman, that taught her about external vs. internal locus of control as normative and sparked her interest in understanding how to develop programs that could bring about sustainable changes in the quality of life of highly marginalized populations. This was determinant in forming her interest in social psychology and served as inspiration for her later research.

Hartman's emphasis on intrinsic values over those that value pressure to conform/to please others that comes with reliance on systemic values in many cultures were the basis for the establishment and bases of the Yo quiero Yo puedo programs.

In 1975, she received her bachelor's in social psychology from the London School of Economics and Political Science (University of London), and then began Ph.D. research at that school.

Her doctoral thesis research suggests that, although many of the women in these communities liked the idea of family planning, they lacked the possibility of using contraception because they did not know how to use it, lacked access, feared social scrutiny, or, most importantly, believed that they did not have the right to make these decisions about their health. Her study indicated that the women were incapacitated by feelings of guilt, shame, fear, resentment, and prejudice. With these findings, Pick suggested that the reason why many health programs were unsuccessful in reducing unwanted pregnancies was because their sexuality education models did not confront these psychosocial barriers, which were ultimately preventing young women from using contraception. In 2010, she published her findings and subsequent theory of social change in her book Breaking the Poverty Cycle: The Human Basis for Sustainable Development.

== Career ==
Pick began her career as a professor at the National Autonomous University of Mexico (Universidad Nacional Autónoma de México) in 1975 . Among the courses she has taught are: research methods, group dynamics, health and development, life skills, competencies for personal agency, and the integration of social and human development .

In 1984, she took a year of sabbatical at Anahuac University. In 1985, she founded the non-government organization IMIFAP (Yo quiero Yo puedo), devoted to bolstering human and social development in Mexico in the areas of health, citizenship, productivity, and education. The FrEE (Framework for Enabling Empowerment), the foundation of all Yo quiero Yo puedo programs, is based on the “Human Capabilities Approach”, developed by Nobel Laureate Amartya Sen which FrEE makes operational. It does so by integrating Martin Fishbein's theory of behavior change, Hartman's theory of values, the development of life skills, and the reduction of psychosocial barriers such as fear, guilt, shame, resentment, and prejudice.

In 1994, Dr. Pick began a two-year project with the Autonomous University of the State of Mexico to develop a degree program focused on the psychosocial aspects of health. In 2005, she participated in another two-year fellowship, this time at the Harvard School of Public Health.

She was co-editor for Revista de la Asociación Latinoamericana de Psicología Social (The Latin American Association Journal for Social Psychology) between 1979 and 1984. Between 1993 and 2003, she did editorial consulting for the International Journal of Psychology and, in 2006, contributed to the American Journal of Public Health.

== Awards and honors ==
Her distinctions include the highest-level membership in the Sistema Nacional de Investigadores (Mexico's National System of Researchers) and the Academia de la Investigación Científica (The Academy of Scientific Research), and she served as a member of the Doctoral Committee in the Faculty of Psychology at Universidad Autónoma de Nuevo León (Autonomous University of Nuevo León) from 1998 through 2000. In 1995, she was elected to the Presidency for the International Scientific Committee in the 25th Inter-American Congress for Psychology, and in 1997, she held the Presidency for the First Regional Congress of Psychology for Professionals in Mexico.

In 2001, she received the American Psychological Association's “Distinguished International Psychologist Award” in 2002. In 2005, she received the “Florence Denmark/Gori Gunwald Award for Contributions to Women’s Psychology” from the International Council of Psychologists. In 2006, she received the “Distinguished Professional Award” from the International Association of Applied Psychology as well as the award for “Creators of Social Psychology” from the Mexican Association of Social Psychology. She is an Ashoka Fellow and in 2011 Yo quiero Yo puedo received the Inter-American Development Bank (IDB) “Juscelino Kubitschek” Merit Award for Regional Development in Latin America and the Caribbean.
