= Femicide in Latin America =

Murder of women motivated by gender

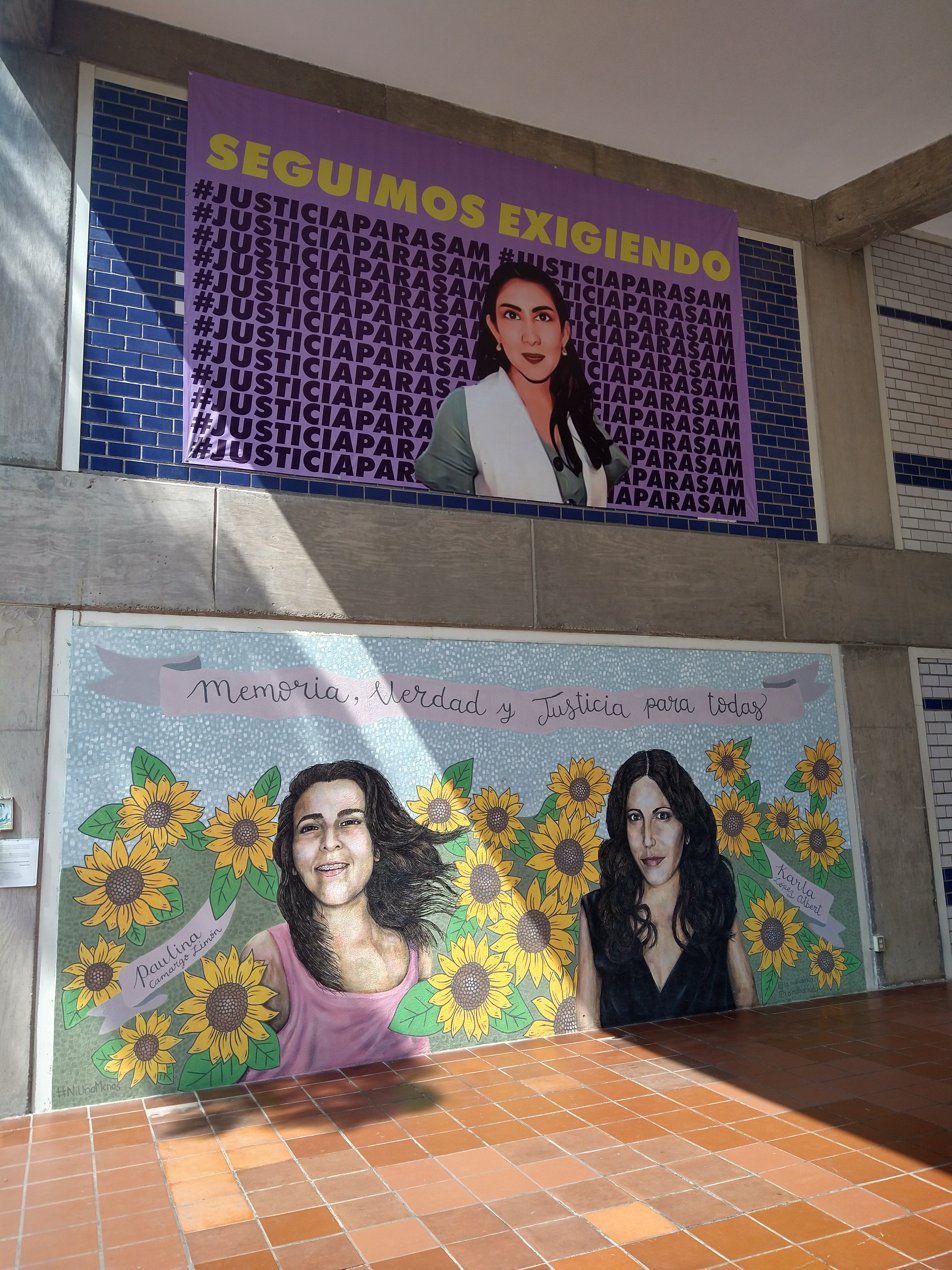
Murals in Mexico dedicated to memorializing three victims of femicide: Paulina Camargo, Karla López y Samantha Rosales.

Femicide, broadly defined as the murder of a woman motivated by gender, is a prevalent issue in Latin America. In 2016, 14 of the top 25 nations with the highest global femicide rates were Latin American or Caribbean states. In 2021, 4,445 women were recorded victims of femicide in the region, translating to the gender-based murder of about one woman every two hours in Latin America.

Throughout the 2010s, Latin American governments began legally recognizing and distinguishing the crime of femicide. This, coupled with records collection support provided to many states by the United Nations Economic Commission for Latin America and the Caribbean (ECLAC), has allowed Latin American nations to produce more comprehensive data on femicide rates across the region. Ten Latin American countries have laws ordering the collection of data on gender-related violence, and femicide as of 2022 with the GEO's data.

Despite efforts to reform, Latin American femicide rates have not decreased substantially in recent years, with the total number of femicides increasing from 4,091 2020 to 4,445 in 2021. A series of factors account for high rates of femicide in Latin America, including entrenched gender roles and the persistence of machismo, organized crime and criminal governance, and weak justice institutions that treat gender-based crimes with impunity. The impacts of femicide include violation of basic human rights, displacement of women, and amplification of organized crime and ineffective justice systems. Activists and feminist groups across Latin America have created movements protesting high rates of femicide and state complicity in failing to address violence against women. Some of the movements that have gained traction are the "Disappearing Daughters" project in Ciudad Juarez and the "Ni Una Menos" movement originating in Argentina. Pink crosses are used to commemorate victims of femicide throughout Latin America.

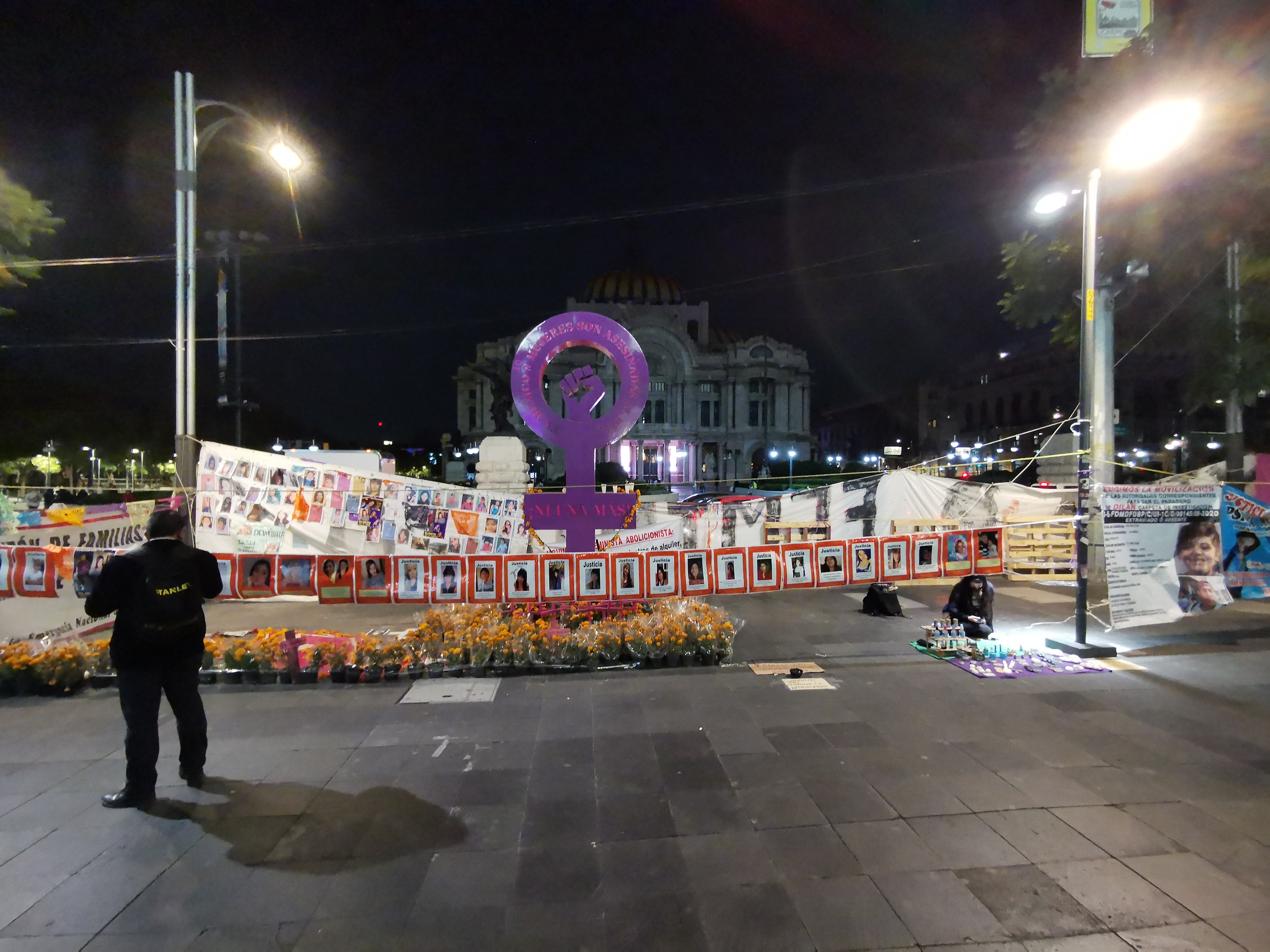
A monument installed in March 2019 in Mexico City. Inscribed are the words "EN MEXICO 9 MUJERES SON ASESINADAS AL DIA. NI UNA MAS!", which translates to "In Mexico, 9 women are assassinated every day. Not one more!"

== Incidence ==
Every year, the Gender Equality Observatory (GEO) of the United Nations Economic Commission for Latin America and the Caribbean (ECLAC) publishes a report of the national femicide rates provided by Latin American and Caribbean nations and territories for the previous year. In 2021, 4,445 women were recorded victims of femicide or gender-related killing in the 18 Latin American nations and territories that reported their data to the GEO. The Wilson Center estimates that this rate translates to women in Latin America dying every two hours due to femicide.

According to the GEO's data for 2021, Brazil reported the highest raw number of femicides at 1,900 women murdered, while Puerto Rico reported the lowest raw number at 12 women murdered. However, Puerto Rico's rate may be impacted by the fact that it only records instances of femicide that are specifically perpetrated against women by their intimate partners - the same stipulation is true of Nicaragua, which reported 15 femicides in 2021. The different trends regarding femicide across the countries in Latin America show that factors such as machismo, organized crime, and gender roles have roles of varying severity in each country.

=== Highest rates of femicide ===
Honduras, the Dominican Republic, El Salvador, Bolivia, and Brazil reported the highest rates of femicide across the region respectively in 2021. In Honduras, 4.6 women per 100,000 were the victims of femicide. In the Dominican Republic, 2.7 women per 100,000 were the victims of femicide. In El Salvador, 2.4 women per 100,000 were the victims of femicide. In Bolivia, 1.8 women per 100,000 were the victims of femicide. Finally, in Brazil, 1.7 women per 100,000 were the victims of femicide.

=== Lowest rates of femicide ===
Nicaragua, Chile, Puerto Rico, Costa Rica, and Peru reported the lowest rates of femicide across Latin America in 2021. In Nicaragua, 0.4 women per 100,000 were the victims of femicide. In Chile, 0.5 women per 100,000 were the victims of femicide. In both Costa Rica and Puerto Rico, 0.7 women per 100,000 were the victims of femicide. In Peru, 0.8 women per 100,000 were the victims of femicide.

=== Femicide rates over time ===
ECLAC has compiled data on the change in rates of femicide across Latin American nations and territories over time. Despite recent efforts to reduce gender-based violence in the region, there was no significant decline in rates of femicide across Latin America from 2019 to 2021. Some nations have recorded a small drop in femicide rates in recent years. In Honduras, for example, the femicide rate dropped from 6.0 female victims per 100,000 in 2019 to 4.5 female victims per 100,000 in 2020 - before increasing slightly to 4.6 female victims per 100,000 in 2021. Other nations have recorded an increase in femicide rates over the observed period. In Mexico, for example, the femicide rate increased from 1.5 female victims per 100,000 in 2019 and 2020 to 1.6 female victims per 100,000 in 2021.

=== Femicide rates by relationship to perpetrator ===
Globally, the largest perpetrators of femicide are women's intimate partners - both current and past partners. In Latin America, however, data on the connection between femicide and the victim's relationship to the offender is less cohesive.

For some nations, the vast majority of femicides are committed by former or current intimate partners. In 2021, Argentina, Uruguay, Peru, Ecuador, Paraguay, and Chile all recorded that women were murdered by former or current intimate partners in over 70% of femicide cases. Specifically, these intimate partner femicides accounted for 93% of Chile's reported gender-based murders of women. In Uruguay, 1.1 women per 100,000 were the victims of femicide by intimate partners in 2021. An important consideration to make is that certain Latin American countries like El Salvador and Uruguay do not characterize intimate partner violence or femicide as a crime, which can underestimate the incidence of femicide in these countries.

By contrast, for other nations, intimate partner femicides account for the minority of gender-based murders of women. In both El Salvador and Honduras, 25% or less of recorded femicides in 2021 were committed by past or current intimate partners. This is thought to be due to a larger presence of organized crime and violence in society that accounts for a larger portion of femicides, with women being killed by strangers and gang members.

=== Femicide rates and migration ===
According to qualitative studies, high migration flow across Latin America likely contributes to increased rates of femicide. Migrant women are particularly vulnerable to gender-based killing and violence as a result of contextual issues like deficient support systems, discrimination, social stigma, insecurity of legal status, and language barriers in Latin America. Furthermore, many women are traveling alone without company or protection against the gender-based crimes they could become victims of.

However, a limited number of Latin American nations and territories have recorded data on the nationality or migratory status of the victims of femicide. In 2021, foreign women were murdered in 18% of recorded femicides in Chile. In the Dominican Republic, foreign women were the victims in 13% of recorded femicides. Finally, in Costa Rica, foreign women accounted for 11% of recorded femicides. According to ECLAC, these three Latin American nations have experienced high rates of migration and migratory flow in recent years - potentially indicating a relationship between female migration and femicide.

The North Triangle of Central America (NTCA) consists of El Salvador, Guatemala, and Honduras and also experiences high rates of emigration and migratory flow. This is due to a lack of safety for women in these countries. which have very high rates of gender-based violence. However, according to 2017 data from Medecins Sans Frontieres (MSF), close to one third of women who passed through Mexico while migrating were sexually abused. The perpetrators include individuals, gangs, and law enforcement, which have been reported to abuse their authority to take advantage of the migrants.

=== Femicide rates and age ===
According to data collected from 2019 to 2021 from the Gender Equality Observatory, the greatest incidence of femicide occurs in victims aged 15 to 29. The impacts of femicide start for girls at a young age, with over 4% of femicides regarding girls aged 14 or younger. This data shows a negative correlation between age and incidence of femicide.

There is also a high rate of Child marriage that disproportionately impacts girls and young women in Latin America, compared to young men, predisposing them to be more vulnerable to gender-based violence. Data from the GEO has shown that child marriage increases the likelihood of girls and women to be victims of intimate partner violence and femicide.

=== Data collection concerns ===
Accurate and comprehensive data collection on crime and violence in Latin America poses significant challenges. In the context of gender-based killings, public and private organizations similarly have struggled to aggregate quality data on rates of femicide and relevant contextual factors in Latin American countries. Instances of violence against women and femicide are often underreported, and many nations fail to include intersectional variables like race, ethnicity, migrant status, pregnancy, or sexual orientation in data on femicide victims. Recorded femicide rates are also impacted by definitional differences across the region. For example, both Puerto Rico and Nicaragua, with some of the lowest recorded rates of femicide in Latin America, only report intimate partner femicide to the Gender Equality Observatory - excluding gender-based killings committed by other types of offenders.

However, many nations are making efforts to address issues of incomplete and under-reported data on violence against women. Ten Latin American states have recently passed laws requiring the collection and circulation of data and information on femicide and other crimes of violence against women. Many countries have updated their definitions, indicators, and investigation methods in the context of femicide in recent years - resulting in corrected and more complete data on historical incidences of gender-based killings. ECLAC has continued to support Latin American nations in expanding and enhancing their records and data collection on femicide rates.

== Contributing factors ==
While data are limited, a host of cultural, economic, and political factors may contribute to the high rates of femicide and gender-based killings across Latin America.

=== Gender roles ===
Patriarchal beliefs and practices persist in many Latin American cultures. Gender roles in Latin America are influenced by an historical commitment to the cultural phenomena of machismo and marianismo. Machismo denotes aggrandized masculinity and male superiority, and prioritizes traditional conceptions of men as aggressive, dominant, and even violent towards women. Information collected from Guatemala shows that violence is seen as an appropriate and justified manner of "discipline" for a husband, or man in a relationship. Marianismo, by contrast, conceives of women and traditional femininity as domestic, inferior, self-sacrificing, and accommodating of male aggression and violence.

Due to the emphasis on a strong male protagonist and a submissive female side character, both concepts derived from Roman Catholicism, harmful gender roles have been tied to religion and deeply entrenched in Latin American society. The term marianismo is rooted in the precedent set by the virgin Mary, mother of Jesus, which women are expected to adhere to.

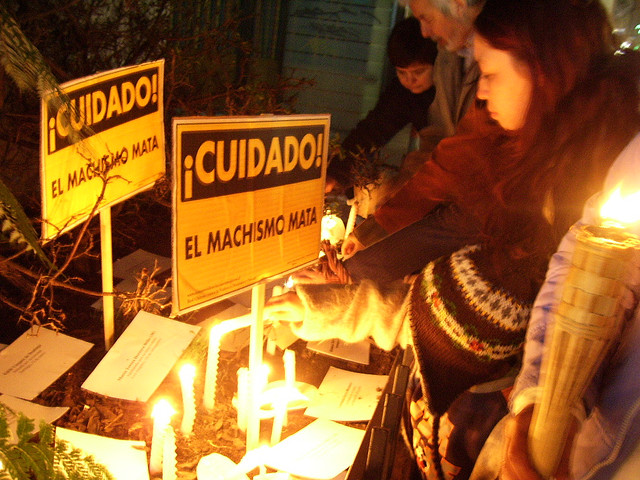
A candle memorial at an anti-femicide protest in Chile. The poster reads "¡Cuidado! El Machismo Mata" drawing explicit linkage between machisimo as a cultural norm and the gender-based murder of women in Latin America.

In Mexico, the Guadalupe-Malinche binary further shows the subjugation and societal expectations that limit women. La Malinche and the Lady of Guadalupe are two figures used to show the essence of a "good" and "bad" woman. La Malinche is known as the translator for Hernán Cortés, as well as his mistress, and is seen as a villain for helping Cortes conquer Mexico. In reality however, she was a slave to Cortes and was likely a victim of rape by him. On the opposite side is La Virgen de Guadalupe, who is hailed as the essence of a "good woman," because she is seen in a purely maternal role, with no independent activity of her own. It is common for women in Latin America to be categorized into one of these binary categories, which takes away their identity, and is often used to justify femicide and other forms of gender-based violence.

The history of these gender roles, especially those rooted in Catholicism, is tied to colonialism. Not only was Roman catholicism brought to Latin America through Spanish colonization and conversion, many of the social norms in Latin America regarding gender mirror those of colonial Spain. For example, Latin America and colonial Spain both emphasized the values of honor amongst men, and purity of women. If women acted in a way deemed impure, it was cited as justification for violence against. It has been observed that men, even if they do not engage in intimate partner violence themselves, are unlikely to stand up against men who abuse their partner out of respect for the other man and his actions. These are practices that were seen in colonial Spain that took root in Latin America, contributing to societal structures that subjugate women, and normalize violence against them.

Many scholars have hypothesized that machismo and marianismo contribute directly to violence against women and femicide in Latin America. Katharine Pantaleo of the Indiana University of Pennsylvania links Latin American cultural norms of machismo and marianismo to gender-based murders of women. Pantaleo how entrenched notions of male supremacy and female inferiority contribute to a culture of gender-based violence and femicide, exemplified by the Maquiladora murders of over 370 women and girls in Ciudad Juarez.

ECLAC draws connections between gender inequality in Latin America and the persistence of femicide and other acts of violence against women. Data explicitly recording instances of machismo-motivated femicide is limited. However, in one study, the Ministerio Publico of São Paulo reported that 30% of annual femicides in São Paulo, Brazil were caused by machismo or jealousy.

Peru is a country with one of the highest rates of intimate partner violence, with 68% of women being impacted. It has been found that attitudes against violence amongst men in Peru are that violence is normal, and "justified" in most cases. Men surveyed in this article admitted that they themselves would use violence against their partner if it was with a "reason," or because they lost control of their temper. This normalization of violence against women brings down the standards of how women should be treated, and makes violent acts against them like femicide less of a jarring occurrence, as the life of a woman is already devalued.

The prevalence of entrenched gender roles in Latin American society becomes important when addressing the issue of femicide through legislation. While laws have power, they cannot change deeply rooted cultural norms which impact the incidence of femicide greatly.

=== Organized crime ===
ECLAC identifies violence and organized crime as contextual factors that contribute to femicide in Latin America. Femicides in many Latin American nations have been linked to organized crime, drug trafficking, cartel wars, and conflicts between criminal organizations and the state.

In 2020, the National Map of Femicides in Mexico reported that up to 63% of femicides recorded in March and April were linked to organized crime in some capacity. Map creator Maria Salguero has identified a series of themes in these gang-related femicides - murders targeting women who participate in organized crime, women with partners involved in criminal organizations, and symbolic killings of women to send messages to other criminal organizations or the state. According to the Women's Coordination Unit in El Salvador, women may also be killed for rejecting the advances of gang members.

The problem of gang-related femicide is exacerbated by the culture of fear and violent retaliation surrounding organized crime and criminal governance in Latin America. Family members of victims and witnesses of femicides may refuse to cooperate with investigations into gender-related killings to avoid violent retaliation by criminal groups.

=== Justice institutions and impunity ===
==== Legislature ====
While 16 countries have implemented legislation that criminalizes and punishes femicide, there are many considerations to be made about the implementation and nature of these laws. The legal definition of femicide varies between countries in Latin America, with some not including femicide or gender-based violence within romantic relationships as a crime, or as a crime with a lesser degree of severity. This exclusion of femicide and gender-based violence when it occurs in a marriage leaves those in marriages underserved by these laws.

The definition of femicide is highly variable depending on the country. For example, Chile, Costa Rica, and the Dominican Republic solely focus on femicide between intimate partners, which does not recognize the other femicides that occur outside of this lens, and diminishes their importance in these countries. The different views regarding femicide between countries arise from each country's level of progress in acknowledging femicide as a social issue. Sexual violence is a criterion for the classification of the murder of a woman to be considered femicide in 9 countries. In Mexico, it is specified that physical mutilation or necrophilia is an essential circumstance for femicide to be legally distinguished. These conditions placed upon legal definitions of femicide not only create a narrow scope for what can be classified as femicide, but also look at the issue through the lens of objectifying women, and tying their identity to being used by men.

There is also a lack of knowledge that impedes these laws from being put into practice. Those responsible for upholding the legal system do not have enough information about how the law functions, as well the exact definitions of many useful legal terms that are vital to upholding the laws being passed to outlaw femicide. Citizens also are not aware of the laws being passed and how they change existing laws, further impeding the effectiveness of these laws.

==== Effectiveness ====
In Latin America, only one percent of femicides are actually sentenced, with less than three percent of cases even successfully making it to prosecution. Weak and inaccessible justice systems contribute to entrenched impunity and failures of the state to convict perpetrators for gender-based killings. In many Latin American nations, police units fail to meaningfully enforce laws against violence against women - reacting with either apathy or animosity to reports of gender-based violence that can escalate into femicide. Women have reported significant rates of police officers refusing to believe reports of gender-based violence or actively retaliating with threats.

Within the legal system, conviction rates of perpetrators are low, and sentences are oftentimes inadequate. In Mexico, a woman named Rocio Mancilla was murdered by her husband, who was sentenced to less than two years in prison.

Within the culture of impunity fostered by the lack of action taken by governments to punish those committing femicide, gang violence and organized crime remains a large factor of femicide, with no legal repercussions for their violence against women. In 2015, half of the victims of femicide were due to organized crime.

Protestors across Latin America have accused justice systems of complicity in their failures to convict perpetrators of femicide and violence against women. In El Salvador, 12 percent of recorded cases of violence against women actually involved perpetrators employed by the justice system - including judges, police officers, and lawyers. Police officers have been reported to commit acts of violence against women frequently, especially on the migration outflow from the North Triangle of Central America. A common complaint against governments is their lack of actively condemning and speaking out against femicide and violence against women.

There is a key issue with the translation of national laws into state practice. Latin American governments have been creating legislature that punishes violence against women, yet there has not been a successful adoption of these laws by state governments, who have remained unresponsive.

=== Colonial legacies and structural violence ===
The effects of colonialism continue to shape the conditions that allow femicide to continue in Latin America. European conquest established racial and gender-based social structures that put Indigenous and Afro-Latina women in more vulnerable positions. These inequalities continue to persist today in access to protection and justice through basic state support, allowing for women to be victims of gender-based violence with little to no accountability or punishment faced when violence occurs.

The region's colonial past still influences how governments respond to violence. Ingrained power structures and uneven social systems have shaped the way states respond to gender-based violence. Many Indigenous societies had different gender roles before conquest, but colonialism introduced a hierarchical system of patriarchy that left women of color more vulnerable to violence.

In areas of significant inequality where state response is minimal, impunity allows gender-based violence to persist in everyday life. When authorities fail to properly investigate these murders and punish those responsible, it reinforces the notion that women are less valuable and leads to a society in which harmful actions against them are tolerated and normalized. This pattern stems from these colonial systems of domination that treated women of color as disposable.

== Impacts ==
=== Health of women ===
The threat of violence and femicide inhibits the freedom and can have serious consequences on the mental and physical health of women in Latin America. Violence with femicide risk has increased the likelihood of women to suffer from conditions that impact their mental health like depression, post-traumatic stress disorder, and anxiety, due to the high levels of stress and trauma experienced. Women who suffered from violence with femicide risk were also found to be more likely to resort to substance abuse as a coping mechanism. Women were found to increase their consumption of alcohol and tobacco if they were victims of gender-based violence, which worsened their outlook for the future, as women who resort to substances are less likely to leave the relationship.

There are also physical impacts of femicide and the threat of it on Latin American women. Women in these conditions also have decreased sexual health, with a higher incidence of urinary tract infections and loss of desire for sexual activity or contact. These physical and mental consequences of violence with femicide risk have been shown to impede the ability of women to complete activities of daily living, taking a severe toll on their overall well-being.

In terms of sexual health and Reproductive rights in Latin America, many organizations have tried to bring awareness about gender-based violence in Latin American countries focusing on the healthcare sector. This includes providing reproductive services that have historically not been provided, or educating providers about the impact of gender-based violence.

While the health of women in these conditions of violence suffers, the impacts are heterogeneous in nature and vary greatly from woman to woman, based on other aspects of their lives, like Socioeconomic status and level of education, and other aspects of the individual. The impacts also vary depending on the type of violence experienced by the women. Income has been found to be a significant factor in determining how much women's health can suffer from violence with femicide risk. It was found that violence of femicide risk however, had bigger consequences on women's health than Poverty.

=== Impacts on children ===
Femicide and the threat of it has been shown to negatively impact children in many ways. Children have been shown to be impacted developmentally, with the stress and risk of violence in their household during the formative years of their life. Children are also more likely to be involved in gender-based violence either as a victim or aggressor in the future when they are exposed to it in their household. There have also been cognitive concerns for the children's development. There have also been proven negative impacts on the children's mental health, due to the chronic stress and instability that results from femicide and its risk. Children have been shown to internalize the turmoil of their household and this results in an increased incidence of anxiety and depression. The external impacts of living in a society where femicide is a prevalent phenomenon include increased aggression and volatile temper, due to a lack of emotional cultivation. There are also physical impacts on a child's health, with increased likelihood of diarrhea, respiratory infections, stunted growth, and anemia. Furthermore, the risk of femicide can also negatively impact the child's relationship with their mother, limiting their emotional and physical support network which are vital to a child's growth.

== By country ==
=== Mexico ===
==== Femicide after being legally distinguished in Mexico ====
Femicide in Mexico is an issue that is prevalent, yet difficult to address with the legal system because it has proven inefficient at reducing the incidence of it. There was a 135% increase in the number of femicide victims from 2015 to 2021. despite legal efforts of the Mexican government to address the issue. The first reliably documented case of femicide in Mexico goes back to January 1993, with the murder of Alma Chavira Farel.

Femicide was distinguished as its own crime under federal Mexican law on June 14, 2012. It would not be until 2015, three years after femicide was distinguished under Mexican Penal Code, that the Mexican Supreme Court would establish that each violent murder of a woman would be investigated as a femicide, until there is evidence to show otherwise. Between 2012 and 2017, there were 12,796 homicide victims that were female. However, only 22% of the investigations around these crimes began with the suspicion of femicide. 70% of the victims were murdered in the public sphere. Around 40% of these cases had victims between the ages of 21 and 30. According to ONU Mujeres, case numbers decreased from 2012 to 2015 and increased from 2015 to 2017. In fact, according to the "Secretariado Ejecutivo del Sistema Nacional de Seguridad Pública" (SESNSP, translates to "Executive Secretariat of the National Public Security System"), both femicides and the homicide against women has been increasing since 2015. Since the start of 2021 to May 2021, femicide cases rose by 7.1%, which makes up for 423 women.

==== Ciudad Juarez, Chihuahua ====
Femicide occurs throughout Mexico, but there was also a case in Ciudad Juarez, of a concentration of women being found who were victims of femicide. Femicide in Ciudad Juarez has promulgated femicide into Mexican political discussion since 1993. Of the 442 homicides against women that occurred between 1993 and 2005, a majority of the victims were between the age of 10 and 29 (54.1%). Additionally, 26.5% of these victims were below the age of 18. 1995 saw the most homicides throughout this time with 49 women killed. Of the 442 women killed, 301 have been femicides, where 126 were committed by an intimate partner, 150 were committed by men who clearly used misogyny or sexism and sexually or physically abused the victim, and 25 were killed doing a "stigmatized" occupation like sex work.

Of the women that died due to intimate-partner violence, reasons included jealousy and an argument, or in some cases there were no causes reported. In cases where a minor was murdered, reasons included punishment for crying, general abuse, or without a known motive. Of the women killed doing a stigmatized occupation, 5 victims were killed because of relationship problems, 4 were killed so the perpetrator could avoid paying, and 11 were killed with no conclusive motivation. Out of 38 systemic femicides, victims were killed out of jealousy, intoxication, or no conclusive motivation.

=== Peru ===
In Peru, 58% of women reported domestic violence in their relationship, from 2019 data. However, the incidence of domestic violence is not seen as socially unacceptable in Peru, which leads to less stigma surrounding domestic violence, and subjugates women who may not go looking for help, because they do not believe there is an issue with intimate-partner violence in a relationship. This points to needing a change in social norms, more than amending legislature in order to effectively address the issue. There is also a high variance of the mechanism of femicides in Peru, with the nature of crime ranging from strangling, stabbing, burning or vehicular manslaughter. The mean age of victims of femicide in Peru is 35 years old, and perpetrators were found to share characteristics like being the victim's family or past partner. Furthermore, drugs and alcohol were reported to be consumed by the 25% of the perpetrators of femicides.

=== North Triangle of Central America (NTCA) ===
Femicide is the leading cause of death of women who live in The North Triangle of Central America (NCTA), consisting of El Salvador, Guatemala, and Honduras. The NCTA also experienced high levels of migration outflow due to the lack of safety for women, which are subject to gang violence, sexual violence, homicide, and gender-based violence. A common practice in this region includes gang members forcing women into relationships with them, "novias de pandilleros".

There are many crimes that women are subject to in their migration from the NCTA. Women can be sexually abused, or kidnapped and sold into prostitution. As migration laws become more strict in both Mexico and the United States, migrants are constrained to paths that are frequented by smugglers and others that harm the migrants passing through. The law enforcement in Mexico have also been cited as abusing their power as well, whether it be by demanding money or sexually assaulting passengers with threats of death.

The military presence, political instabilities and Honduras and El Salvador have created violence and disorder in the governments of these countries. Disappearance of women has exponentially increased in these countries, along with the presence of gang activity. The number of women that had gone missing increased by 281% in Honduras from 2008 to 2013.

In 2026, following legal reforms in the country, for the first time in its history, El Salvador's court handed a life sentence for femicide.

=== Brazil ===
Femicide in Brazil was recognized in 2015 after legislation was passed to increase women's protections and provide harsher punishments for perpetrators. At that time, femicide rates were the fifth highest in the world and 15 women were murdered daily. Between 2018 and 2020, femicide numbers rose from 1,229 to 1,330 to 1,350, maintaining a proportion of 1.2 women out of 100,000 murdered on average. In Brazil, women of color are disproportionately affected by gendered crimes; Balanço Ligue 180 statistics show that 60% of women that are victims of violence are black. The percentage increases to 68.8% when looking at the rates of homicides against women. Further, the Mapa de Violencia showed that femicide rates among white women fell from 2003 to 2013 and increased for black women in this same period.

=== Dominican Republic ===
In the Dominican Republic, the killing of a woman by a current or former partner is legally classified as "feminicidio". The murders of women that occur outside of this definition are recorded as general homicides. This limits the number of cases that are recognized as femicides in national statistics. Historically, approximately 80% of cases classified as femicide in the Dominican Republic involve an intimate partner.

In 2023, the Dominican Republic reported 137 femicide victims, equal to 2.4 deaths per 100,000 women, the second-highest rate in Latin America. Of these cases, 65.8% were committed by a partner or former partner. Authorities also recorded 93 indirect victims, mostly children or dependents who were affected by the killings. Reported rates have consistently remained high and have shown no decline from 2015 to 2023.

== Media awareness ==
The media has had a positive impact in terms of spreading awareness about femicide and bringing women together to combat the issue. It has been a source of power for social movements that have gained traction across the region.

In regards to the nature of media coverage of femicide, it has been shown that the media can be misleading when reporting on the causes of femicide, as well as sometimes normalizing the gender norms, and societal ideas that are the foundation of violence against women and femicide. In Guatemala, media were found to sensationalize their stories of femicide, and theorize over the circumstances of each case, oftentimes propagating societal expectations and stereotypes based on the victim's identity. Furthermore, the media would make assumptions, or sensationalize the victim's identity if it was perceived as flawed; for example, if a victim was discovered in a public setting, the media was likely to characterize her hypothesized identity as the cause of her murder, by covering her as a sex worker. The focus on the victim's identity as the cause for their circumstances is Victim blaming in nature, and shifts the blame of the crime off of those who committed it, rarely acknowledging the violations of human rights that these women experience.

Multiple films have highlighted the prevalence of femicide in Latin America. "Three Deaths of Marisela Escobedo" tells the story of Marisela Escobedo Ortiz and her fight to hold the perpetrator accountable for the femicide of her daughter, and "Feminicido en Latino America", explores the negative externalities associated with femicide across the region.

== Social movements ==
Different social movements have arisen across Latin America that work to combat the incidence of femicide and raise awareness on the issue.

=== Ni una menos ===
The Ni una menos movement originated in Argentina, although it grew into a movement across many Latin American countries. The movement started in 2015 in protest of the murder of the fourteen year-old Chiara Paez, who was beaten to death by her boyfriend. There were protests and strikes led by women across Argentina, and this spread to other countries including Chile, Paraguay, Peru, Mexico, and Bolivia. The Ni Una Menos movement resulted in legislative action in Argentina, with the government mandating the collection of statistical data on femicide in 2015, and has been followed by some other legal actions to address femicide.

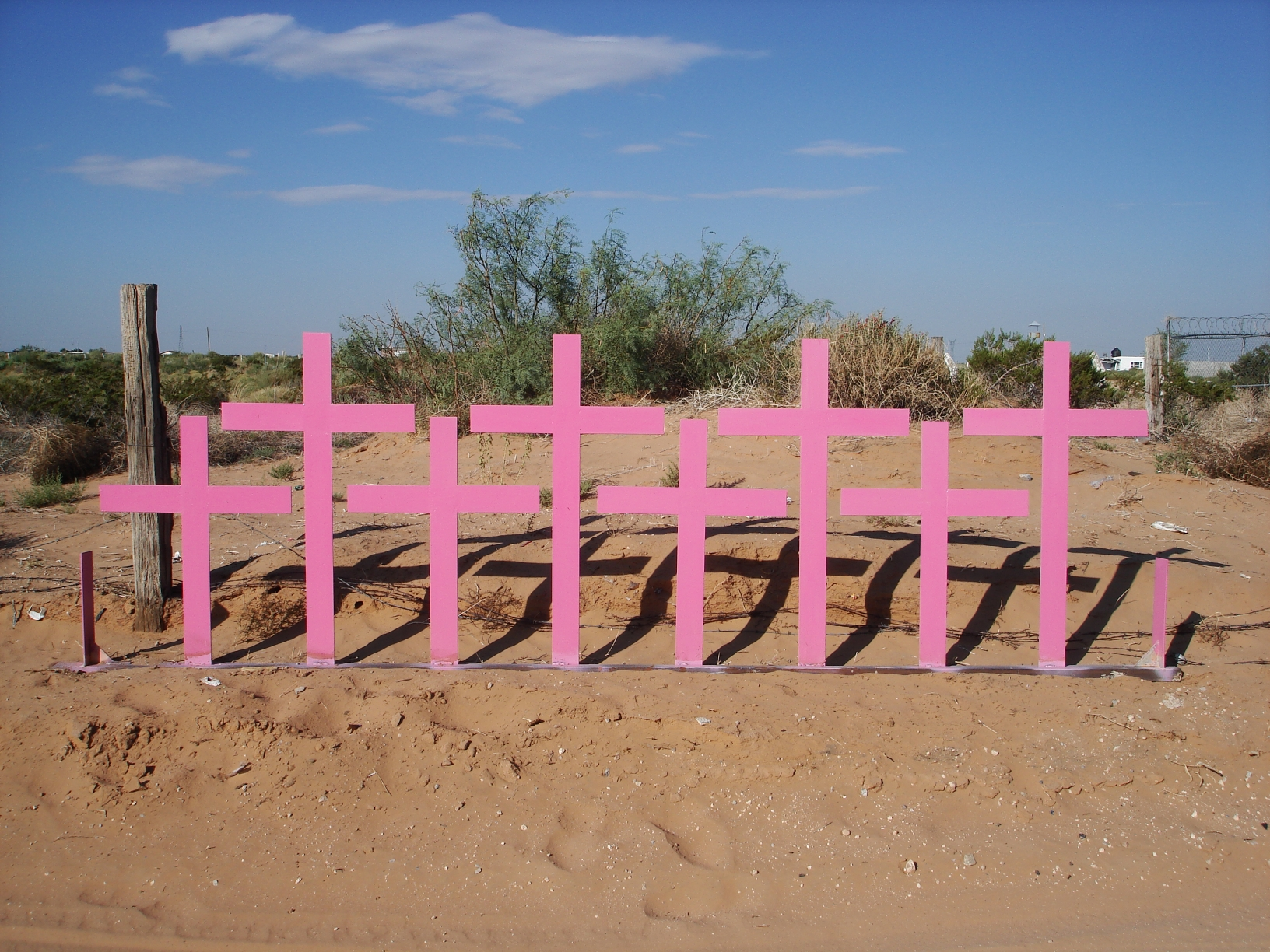
Pink crosses placed to honor 8 victims of femicide in Ciudad Juarez that were found in 1996

=== The Disappearing Daughters Project ===
The Disappearing Daughters Project, originating in Ciudad Juarez, Mexico works to empower women that have lost their daughters to femicide through poetry. The Seattle Times published a website inspired by the poems of Castro Luna, who wrote a book of poems titled "Killing Marias," with each poem named after a Maria that was lost to femicide in Ciudad Juarez. Pink crosses have been used in Ciudad Juarez in order to honor the women and girls lost to femicide.

== See also ==
- 2025 livestreamed murder in Argentina
