= La Prensa (Mexico City) =

Mexican newspaper

- Type: Daily newspaper
- Format: Tabloid
- Owner: Organizacion Editorial Mexicana
- Publisher: Organizacion Editorial Mexicana
- Founded: August 28, 1928
- Language: Spanish
- Headquarters: Mexico City, Mexico
- Circulation: 244,299 (2011)
- Sister newspapers: ESTO, El Sol de México
- Website: La Prensa Mexico

La Prensa is a Mexican newspaper, owned by Organizacion Editorial Mexicana, established in 1928. The newspaper had a circulation of 244,299, the highest circulation of any newspaper in Mexico, as of 2013. Their sister newspaper, ESTO once had the highest circulation of any Mexican newspaper with 400,000 copies.

La Prensa was widely criticized for publishing explicit photos of the mutilated body of Ingrid Escamilla following her murder in February 2020. The paper has defended its policy of reporting on crime but said it will review its policies.

== See also ==
- List of newspapers in Mexico
