= Violence and Activism at the Border =

2008 book by Kathleen Staudt

- Author: Kathleen Staudt
- Language: English
- Genre: Non-fiction
- Publisher: University of Texas Press
- Publication date: 2008
- Publication place: United States
- ISBN: 978-0-292-71670-4

Violence and Activism at the Border is a 2008 book by University of Texas professor Kathleen Staudt, in which the author discusses violence against women in the border city Ciudad Juarez in Mexico.

The book was generally well-received within academic and border-activist circles, with one review commending the interdisciplinary and intersectional framework that Staudt took in her analysis.

== Content ==
In the introduction of the book, Staudt states that the book “contains conceptual, empirical and strategic analyses of interest to multiple audiences concerned with violence, borders, activism, and women and gender.”

She does this by composing a review on existing knowledge of violence to women in Ciudad Juarez, showing data surveys from the survivors of violence in the city, looking at who exactly are the victims, how they reacted, their reasoning to how the violence happened and how much do they fear for their safety in their home.

Chapter Four is more concerned to how activism from local and transnational feminist organizations spread awareness to the violent situation in the border city with its biggest protest in 2004 bringing in approximately 5,000 to 8,000 people to protest against femicide (the murders of women being unsolved and ignored by local law enforcement). This was the peak of the movement but it did bring necessary change as law enforcement in Ciudad Juarez did step up to the concerns of the community and the activists of human rights groups.

Chapter Five is where Staudt looks at the changes and provides an analysis if it is just weak attempts to try and calm activists and community members of their concerns. There has been better enforcement than before but the situation is still very much a depressing one for the safety of women in Ciudad Juarez.

One conclusion that Staudt makes in her book is how neoliberal economic policy has created an environment beside the United States where there are large maquiladoras that provide massive employment but with only 25-50 dollars a week being paid to these workers, putting many in the city into poverty. Violence is more likely in poverty since there is lack of control and added stress of being in poverty. This is why there's greater numbers of violence below the poverty line. Add that with the law enforcement in Ciudad Juarez not being concerned about the well-being of women in the city, having a culture of violence to women being the norm.

With activism having put more pressure towards the government, Staudt shows the changes the government has made could be much better but many Mexican politicians and bureaucrats have been timid in making too much changes in fear of angering the male population in, making the changes for women's safety in Mexico to be slow but steady.
