= Kathleen Staudt =

American political scientist

Kathleen Staudt (born September 8, 1946) is a former professor of political science at the University of Texas at El Paso, where she held an endowed professorship for western hemispheric trade policy studies. Her courses focused on topics such as public policy, borders, democracy, leadership and civic engagement, and women and politics. After retiring on September 1, 2017, she became Professor Emerita.

She has published journal articles, book chapters, and complete books. These primarily focus on border studies, women/gender in international development, immigration, university-community partnership engagement, education, and violence. Many of her books focus on the border between Mexico and the United States, including Violence and Activism at the Border (University of Texas Press, 2008).

== Early life and education ==
Staudt was born in Milwaukee. She obtained her B.A. in political science at the University of Wisconsin–Milwaukee in 1971. Staudt earned her PhD in political science from the University of Wisconsin–Madison in 1976.

== Career ==
Following the completion of her doctorate, Staudt moved to the University of Texas at El Paso (UTEP) in 1977. During the late 1970s, she was studying agricultural extension in Africa. In 1979, she took a leave of absence from UTEP to work for the United States Department of State for the Office of Women in Development of the Agency for International Development. In the early 1980s, she was the coordinator of the Women's Studies Program at UTEP. In the mid 80s, she served as assistant dean for the College of Liberal Arts. Between 1998 and 2008, she founded and directed the Center for Civic Engagement. She has also worked extensively with the United Nations. This has included UNRISD on multilateral and bilateral technical assistance strategies to mainstream women, the UN Division for the Advancement of Women on "Technical Assistance and Mainstreaming Women" (1995) and "Equality in High-Level Political Decision Making" (1989), and the UN Development Programme, Background Paper, "Political Representation: Engendering Democracy" (1995). In the early to mid 90s she created a research team to survey neighborhoods in El Paso and Ciudad Juarez in order to understand economic and gender disparities in various households. Staudt retired as the endowed professor of Western Hemispheric Trade Policy Studies at UTEP in 2017. In 2019, Staudt was awarded a Lifetime Achievement Award from the Association of Borderland Studies (ABS). She is also an organizer for the Community First Coalition.

Her 1991 book, Managing Development, was reviewed by Public Administration Review where they emphasized that her book "is an outstanding source for bibliographical information about recent literature on development." Violence and Activism at the Border (2008) was reviewed by Southwestern American Literature where they wrote that "Staudt shows how keen academic research affects real-world situations and how committed activism is more than tilting at windmills." The Journal of the Royal Anthropological Institute wrote "This book is important for exploring how to find answers to the endemic violence against women in this borderland city along the US‐Mexican frontier." Political Science Quarterly in reviewing Hope for Justice and Power (2020) wrote that she "offers interesting analytical insight to tell the story of broad-based community organizing in the Texas Industrial Areas Foundation."

== Selected bibliography ==
- Agricultural Policy Implementation. Kumarian Press, 1985.
- Women, Foreign Assistance, and Advocacy Administration. 1985.
- Managing Development: State, Society, and International Contexts. 1991. Sage Publications.
- Political Science and Feminisms: Integration or Transformation? 1997.
- Free Trade?: Informal Economies at the U.S.-Mexico Border. Temple University Press. 1998.
- Policy, Politics and Gender: Women Gaining Ground. 1998.
- The U.S.-Mexico Border: Transcending Division, Contesting Identities. 1999. (editor).
- Fronteras No Mas: Toward Social Justice at the U.S.-Mexico Border. 2002. Palgrave Macmillan.
- Rethinking Empowerment: Gender Development in a Global/Local World. 2002. Routledge. (editor).
- Violence and Activism at the Border: Gender, Fear, and Everyday Life in Ciudad Juárez. 2008. University of Texas Press.
- Human Rights Along the U.S. Mexican Border: Gendered Violence and Insecurity. 2009. University of Arizona Press. (editor).
- Courage, Resistance, and Women in Ciudad Juárez: Challenges to Militarization. Kathleen Staudt and Zulma Y. Mundez, 2015. University of Texas Press.
- Border Politics in a Global Era,, Kathleen Staudt, 2017. Rowman & Littlefield.
- Who Rules El Paso?: Private Gain, Public Policy, and the Community Interest. 2019. (co-author).
- Hope for Justice and Power: Broad-based Community Organizing in the Texas Industrial Areas Foundation. 2020. The UNT Press.
