= Mentor Foundation =

Youth development charitable organization

Mentor International (Mentor Foundation) is an international youth development NGO working in the field of substance use disorder prevention. It was founded in 1994 by Queen Silvia of Sweden in collaboration with the World Health Organization. Current trustees include Yvonne Thunell, current chairman, Stefan Persson, Chairman of H&M and Bertil Hult, CEO and founder of EF Education First. Honorary board members include Queen Noor of Jordan, Henri, Grand Duke of Luxembourg and Talal bin Abdul-Aziz Al Saud and Turki bin Talal bin Abdul Aziz Al Saud of the Saudi Royal Family.

Programs administered by the Mentor Foundation have included an adult-to-youth mentoring program run by Mentor Sweden.

== Notable people ==
- Henri, Grand Duke of Luxembourg, active patron as of October 2025
- Queen Noor of Jordan, trustee as of May 2001
- Stefan Persson, co-founder
