= The Twelve Chairs (disambiguation) =

The Twelve Chairs is a 1928 satirical novel by Soviet authors Ilya Ilf and Yevgeny Petrov.

The Twelve Chairs may also refer to:

== Film ==
- Dvanáct křesel, 1933, directed by Martin Fric and Michal Waszynski (Czechoslovakia, Poland)
- Las doce sillas, 1962 Cuban film directed by Tomás Gutiérrez Alea
- The Twelve Chairs (1970 film), US film directed by Mel Brooks
- The Twelve Chairs (1971 film), Russian film directed by Leonid Gaidai
- The Twelve Chairs (1976 film), 1976 Russian miniseries directed by Mark Zakharov
- German: Zwölf Stühle, 2004 German film directed by Ulrike Ottinger
- Persian: دوازده صندلی, 2011, an Iranian film directed by Esmael Barari

== Stage ==
- The Twelve Chairs (Shostakovich), an unfinished operetta by Dmitri Shostakovich
