= Reynaldo Miravalles =

Cuban actor

Reynaldo Agustín Miravalles de la Luz (22 January 1923 – 31 October 2016), known as Reinaldo Miravalles, was a Cuban actor residing in Miami.

His birthplace is Callejón del Chorro, Old Havana. He died on 31 October 2016 in Havana at the age of 93.

== Filmography ==
- 1957: Papalepe (directed by Antonio Graciani)
- 1960: Historias de la Revolución (directed by Tomás Gutiérrez Alea)
- 1961: El joven rebelde (directed by Julio García Espinosa) as Sergeant
- 1962: Las Doce Sillas (directed by Tomás Gutiérrez Alea, The film is based on the picaresque novel with the same title, The Twelve Chairs by Soviet writer duo Ilf and Petrov. Reynaldo Miravalles stars the protagonist, an enterprising con man Ostap Bender. Set in a tropical context, it is starkly similar to the Soviet one of the novel. A notable difference is that in the Cuban version the hero "sees the light", becomes corrected and joins Cuban revolutionary youth in zafra campaign) (sugar cane harvesting). as Oscar
- 1964: Preludio 11 (directed by Kurt Maetzig) as Priest
- 1965: Desarraigo (directed by Fausto Canel)
- 1966: Papeles son papeles (directed by Fausto Canel)
- 1971: Una pelea cubana contra los demonios (directed by Tomás Gutiérrez Alea)
- 1973: El Hombre de Maisinicú (directed by Manuel Pérez)
- 1976: Rancheador (directed by Sergio Giral) as Francisco Estévez
- 1978: El recurso del método (directed by Miguel Littín)
- 1979: Los sobrevivientes (directed by Tomás Gutiérrez Alea) as Vicente Cuervo
- 1979: La viuda de Montiel (directed by Miguel Littin)
- 1982: Alsino and the Condor (Spanish: Alsino y el cóndor) (a Nicaraguan film directed by Miguel Littín) as El Pajarero
- 1983: El señor presidente (directed by Manuel Octavio Gómez) as Fiscal
- 1984: Los pájaros tirándole a la escopeta (directed by Rolando Díaz)
- 1984: El corazón sobre la tierra (directed by Constante Diego)
- 1985: Svindlande affärer (directed by Janne Carlsson) as Kubansk polischef
- 1985 Time to Die (Spanish: Tiempo de morir) (Colombian drama film directed by Jorge Alí Triana) as Casildo
- 1985: Baragua (directed by José Massip)
- 1987: De tal Pedro tal astilla (directed by Luis Felipe Bernaza) as Pedro Quijano
- 1987: Cubagua (directed by Michael New) as Stakelum / Carballo / Diego de Ordaz
- 1988: Vals de la Habana vieja (directed by Luis Felipe Bernaza) as Epifanio
- 1991: Alicia en el pueblo de Maravillas (translated as Alice in Wondertown,) (directed by Daniel Díaz Torres, a controversial film of satire, absurdity and horror, seen as a criticism of the problems of Cuban society. Critic Juan Antonio García Borrero has been planning to include in a book under a tentative title Diez películas que estremecieron a Cuba) (Ten Films That Shook Cuba)
- 1991: Sandino (directed by Miguel Littin) as The Ceramist
- 1991: El Encanto del Regreso (directed by Emilio Oscar Alcalde) as El viejo
- 1992: Mascaró, el cazador americano (directed by Constante (Rapi) Diego)
- 1994: Quiéreme y verás... (directed by Daniel Díaz Torres)
- 1994: El reino de los cielos (directed by Patricia Cardoso)
- 2003: El Misterio Galíndez (directed by Gerardo Herrero) as Don Angelito
- 2003: Dreaming of Julia (directed by Juan Gerard) as Waldo
- 2008: Cercanía (directed by Rolando Díaz) as Heriberto
- 2013: Esther Somewhere (directed by Gerardo Chijona, It is a Cuban-Peruvian co-production shot in Cuba based on a novel by Eliseo Alberto. It was the first Cuban film of Miravalles after the 22-year hiatus) as Lino Catalá. He was awarded the Havana Star Prize for Best Actor for his role in the film at the 15th Havana Film Festival New York.
