= Evelyn Stevens =

Evelyn Stevens may refer to:

- Evelyn Stevens (cyclist)
- Evelyn Stevens (wrestler)
- Evelyn Paniagua Stevens, American scholar of Latin American studies
