= The Twelve Chairs =

1928 novel by Ilya Ilf and Yevgeny Petrov

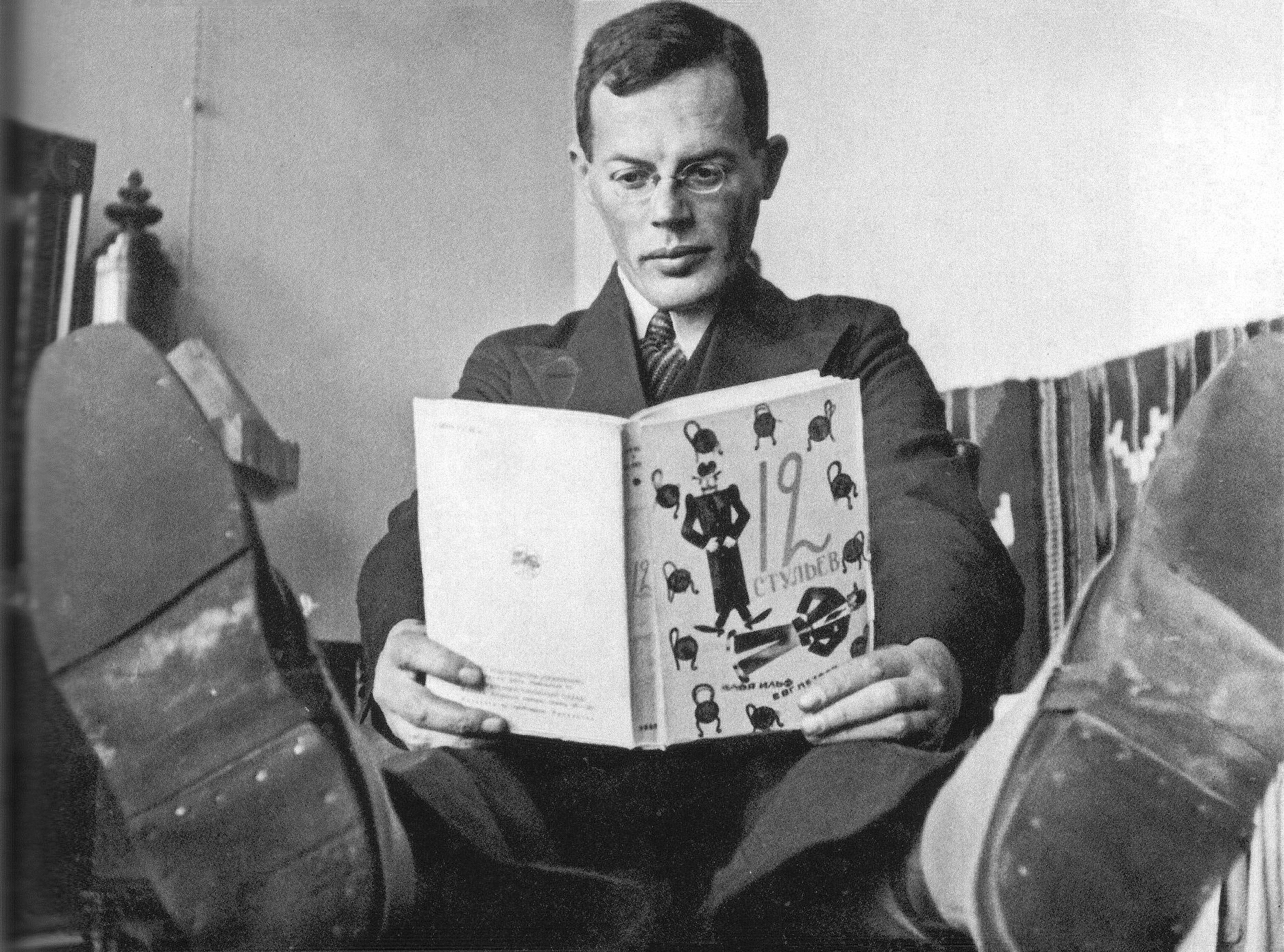
- Ilya Ilf reads the novel, 1930
- Author: Ilf and Petrov
- Original title: «Двенадцать стульев»
- Language: Russian
- Publication date: 1928
- Publication place: Soviet Union
- Original text: «Двенадцать стульев» at Russian Wikisource
- Translation: The Twelve Chairs at Wikisource

The Twelve Chairs (Russian: «Двенадцать стульев», romanized: Dvenadtsat stulyev) is a Russian classic satirical picaresque novel by the Soviet authors Ilf and Petrov, published in 1928. Its plot follows characters searching for jewelry hidden in a chair. The novel has been adapted to other media, primarily film.

The main character, Ostap Bender, reappears in the 1931 book's sequel The Little Golden Calf, despite his apparent death in The Twelve Chairs.

== Plot ==
In the Soviet Union in 1927, during the NEP era, a former Marshal of the Nobility, Ippolit Matveyevich "Kisa" Vorobyaninov, works as the registrar of marriages and deaths in a sleepy provincial town. His mother-in-law reveals on her deathbed that her family jewellery was hidden from the Bolsheviks in one of the twelve chairs from the family's dining-room set. Those chairs, along with all other personal property, were taken away by the Communists after the 1917 Russian Revolution. Vorobyaninov wants to find the treasure. The "smooth operator" and con-man Ostap Bender forces Kisa to become his partner, and they set out to find the chairs. Bender's street-smarts and charm are invaluable to the reticent Kisa, and Bender comes to dominate the enterprise.

The "conсessioners" trace the chairs, which are to be sold at auction in Moscow. They fail to buy them and learn that the chairs have been split up for resale individually. Roaming all over the Soviet Union in their quest to recover the furniture, they have a series of comic adventures, including living in a students' dormitory with plywood walls, posing as bill-painters on a riverboat to earn passage, bamboozling a village chess club with promises of an international tournament, and traveling on foot through the mountains of Georgia.

Their obsessed rival in the hunt for the treasure is father Fyodor (who learned the treasure from the confession of Vorobyaninov's mother-in-law). He follows a bad lead, runs out of money, ends up trapped on a mountain-top, and loses his sanity.

Bender and Kisa acquire each of the chairs in turn, but no treasure is found. They finally discover the location of the last chair. Fed up with his deceitful partner's greedy arrogance and condescending meanness, Vorobyaninov murders (Note: retconned to attempted murder in the sequel) Ostap in his sleep so as to keep all the loot for himself. Vorobyaninov loses his sanity after discovering that the jewels have already been found and were used to fund the building of the new public recreation center in which the chair was found, a symbol of the new society.

== Adaptations ==
- The first cinematic adaptation of the novel is the joint Polish-Czechoslovak film Dvanáct křesel (1933). The original plot was considerably altered, yet many following adaptations were primarily based on this film rather than on the novel itself (e.g., the former marshal of nobility from the novel was replaced in the Polish-Czechoslovak film by a barber who then appeared in several later adaptations).
- In England, the book inspired the film Keep Your Seats, Please (1936), directed by Monty Banks at Ealing Studios and starring George Formby. The action takes place in Britain and involves seven chairs, not twelve.
- In Germany, the film Thirteen Chairs (German: Dreizehn Stühle, 1938) is based on the novel. However, the film does not credit the novel's authors.
- Italian: L’Eredita in Corsa
- Dmitri Shostakovich's unfinished operetta The Twelve Chairs (1939) is based on the novel.
- In Hollywood, the comedy It's in the Bag! (1945) starring Fred Allen is very loosely based on the novel, using just five chairs.
- Swedish: Tretton stolar (1945), Sju svarta be-hå (1954)
- A Brazilian version called Thirteen Chairs (Treze Cadeiras, 1957) stars comedians Oscarito, Renata Fronzi, and Zé Trindade. In this version, the main character, played by Oscarito, inherits his aunt's mansion, which is soon confiscated, leaving him with only 13 chairs. After selling them, he finds out that his aunt had hidden her fortune in the chairs. He then goes on a quest to get the chairs back. Bender's place is taken by a cabaret girl Ivone.
- West Germany: Das Glück liegt auf der Straße (1957)
- Tomás Gutiérrez Alea made a Cuban version titled Las Doce Sillas (1962) with Reynaldo Miravalles as Ostap. Set in a tropical context, in this version the hero "sees the light", becomes corrected and joins Cuban revolutionary youth in zafra campaign (sugar cane harvesting).
- The story also served as the basis for the 1969 film The Thirteen Chairs starring Sharon Tate. The setup is similar to the Brazilian one: a barber (Vittorio Gassman) searches for chairs of his deceased aunt accompanied by his shop assistant Pat (Sharon Tate).
- A Syrian TV series entitled Hamam al-Hana (1968) is based on the premise of this novel. It involves three guys looking for the hidden treasure (a stash of money) all over Damascus, with a chair for every episode. In the last episode, they find the right chair, but the treasure turns out to be old paper money which by then had become useless.
- Mel Brooks made a version titled The Twelve Chairs (1970), following the novel more closely, but with a happier ending. Frank Langella plays the part of Ostap Bender with Ron Moody as Vorobyaninov and Dom DeLuise as Father Fyodor.
- Greece: I Loved an Armchair (Greek: Αγάπησα μια πολυθρόνα, romanized: Agapisa Mia Polythrona) (1971)
- In 1972, a TV series Rabe, Pilz und dreizehn Stühle was produced in Germany.
- In the 1970s, two adaptations were made in the USSR: a film in 1971 by Leonid Gaidai with Archil Gomiashvili as Bender and a miniseries in 1976 by Mark Zakharov with Andrei Mironov as Bender.
- Austria: Mein Opa und die 13 Stühle (1977)
- Germany: Zwölf Stühle a film by Ulrike Ottinger (2004)
- Iran: Persian: دوازده صندلی by Esmael Barari (2011)
- Italy: The Chair of Happiness (it:La sedia della felicità) (2013)

== See also ==
- "The Adventure of the Six Napoleons"
