= Machismo =

Pride in exaggerated masculinity

Machismo (/məˈtʃiːzmoʊ, mɑː-, -ˈtʃɪz-/; Spanish: [maˈtʃismo]; Portuguese: [maˈʃiʒmu]; from Spanish macho 'male' and -ismo) is the sense of being "manly" and self-reliant, a concept associated with "a strong sense of masculine pride: traditional masculinity". Machismo is a term originating in the early 1940s and 1950s and its use became more widespread in popular culture in the 60s.

While the term can be positively associated with "a man's responsibility to provide for, protect, and defend his family", machismo is more often associated with dominance, aggression, grandstanding, inability to nurture, and other aspects of toxic masculinity. Machismo is found to be deeply rooted in family dynamics and a hypermasculinity culture in Latin America.

The word macho has a long history both in Spain and Portugal, including the Spanish and Portuguese languages. Macho in Portuguese and Spanish is a strictly masculine term, derived from the Latin mascŭlus, which means "male". It was originally associated with the ideal societal role men were expected to play in their communities. Ser macho (literally, "to be a macho") was an aspiration for all boys. As history shows, men were often in powerful and dominating roles thus portrayed the stereotype of the macho man. Thus the origin of machismo serves as an illustration of past history, the struggles that colonial Latin America faced and the evolution of gender stereotypes with time.

== Depictions ==
The depictions of machismo vary, yet their characteristics are quite familiar. Machismo is based on biological, historical, cultural, psycho-social, and interpersonal traits or behaviors. Some of the well known traits are:

- Posturing: assuming a certain, often unusual or exaggerated body posture or attitude. The macho must settle all differences, verbal or physical abuse, challenges, or disagreements with violence as opposed to diplomacy.
- Treating their wife as a display of an aloof lord-protector: women are loving, men conquer.
- Bravado: outrageous boasting, overconfidence.
- Social dominance: a socio-culturally defined dominance; macho swagger.
- Sexual prowess: being sexually assertive. Shyness is a collective issue for men.
- Protecting one's honor or pride: believing in protecting the ego in spite of potential risk.
- La calle (the street): is a man's place. This is where men work and show off their masculinity.
- Hardworking: Being able to provide through hard work and labor, often taking tough and demanding jobs.
- A willingness to face danger.

In pop culture, machismo has been portrayed as violent, womanizing, and focusing on the traditional masculine roles of men.

From a Mexican-Chicano cultural and psychological perspective, the psycho-social traits can be summarized as: emotional invulnerability, patriarchal dominance, aggressive or controlling responses to stimuli, and ambivalence toward women. These traits have been seen as a Mexican masculine response to the Spanish conquistador conquering of the Americas. Before Mexico was colonized by the Spaniards, indigenous peoples, including the Aztecs, worshipped Xochipilli an Aztec God, associated with male homosexuality. The Spanish colonization led to the criminalization of homosexuality, causing the loss of many indigenous practices and traditions related to it. In contemporary, post-colonial Mexican identity, machismo ideals, introduced during the colonial period, have become prominent. It has been noted by some scholars that machismo was adopted as a form of control for the male body.

Some experts hypothesize, since there is a lack of empirical research on gender-role conflicts, that men might suffer from such conflicts because of their fear of femininity.

Professionals from several universities in the United States developed a model around this hypothesis with six behavioral patterns:

1. Restrictive emotionality: restraining oneself from expressing feelings or not allowing others to express their feelings.
2. Homophobia: the fear of homosexuals or the fear of being a homosexual, not limited to all the stereotypes associated with that.
3. Socialized control, power, and competition: The desire for the authority of being in charge of the situation, commanding others, and to excel above others.
4. Restrictive sexual and affectional behavior: Showing little to no affection or sexuality to others.
5. Obsession with achievement and success: having an ongoing complex that accomplishment, work, and illustriousness constitutes one's value.
6. Health problems: unhealthy diet, stress levels, and lifestyle.

The model was developed around the idea that these six patterns are all influenced by men's fear of femininity. This theory was then partially supported by a study done by five professionals. Some tools already created to measure gender-role attitudes include the Personal Attributes Questionnaire, the Bem Sex-Role Inventory, the Attitudes Toward Women Scale, and the Attitudes Toward the Male's Role Scale. Evidence suggests that gender-roles conflicts inflicted by machismo can lead males who were raised with this mentality and or live in a society in which machismo is prevalent to suffer high levels of anxiety and low self-esteem. Additionally, studies found that many males facing such conflicts are subject to experience anger, depression, and substance abuse.

== Men and women ==
=== Gender roles ===
The idea of the male ego, where the male is symbolized as "hyper-masculine, virile, strong, paternalistic, sexually dominant, and the financial provider" is reinforced by the teachings of the Catholic Church, the main religion practiced in Cuba and Latin America in general. According to cultural Catholic Church teachings, the female should be a virgin but it's less important for the male to be one. During colonial times, a female's chastity and demureness were linked to the family's societal standings [new], while the males were expected and sometimes pressured into proving their sexual prowess by having multiple partners. There was a duality in the expression of love. Men were supposed to express between physical loves, while women were expected to only express spiritual love and romantic love. Even after marriage, carnal love was frowned upon if the woman expressed it too vigorously, instead she was more delighted by the romantic expression of the love. Men and women in these belief systems are held at double standards, women, are quiet, clean, spiritual, pure and sexually conservative, whereas it is socially acceptable for men to be the opposite, loud, dirty, not religious, and sexually active and assertive.

The role of inside and outside spaces such as la casa, the house, and la calle, the street are crucial in propagating machista beliefs. This is because it separates men and women into two completely different worlds and social spheres.

==== Marianismo ====
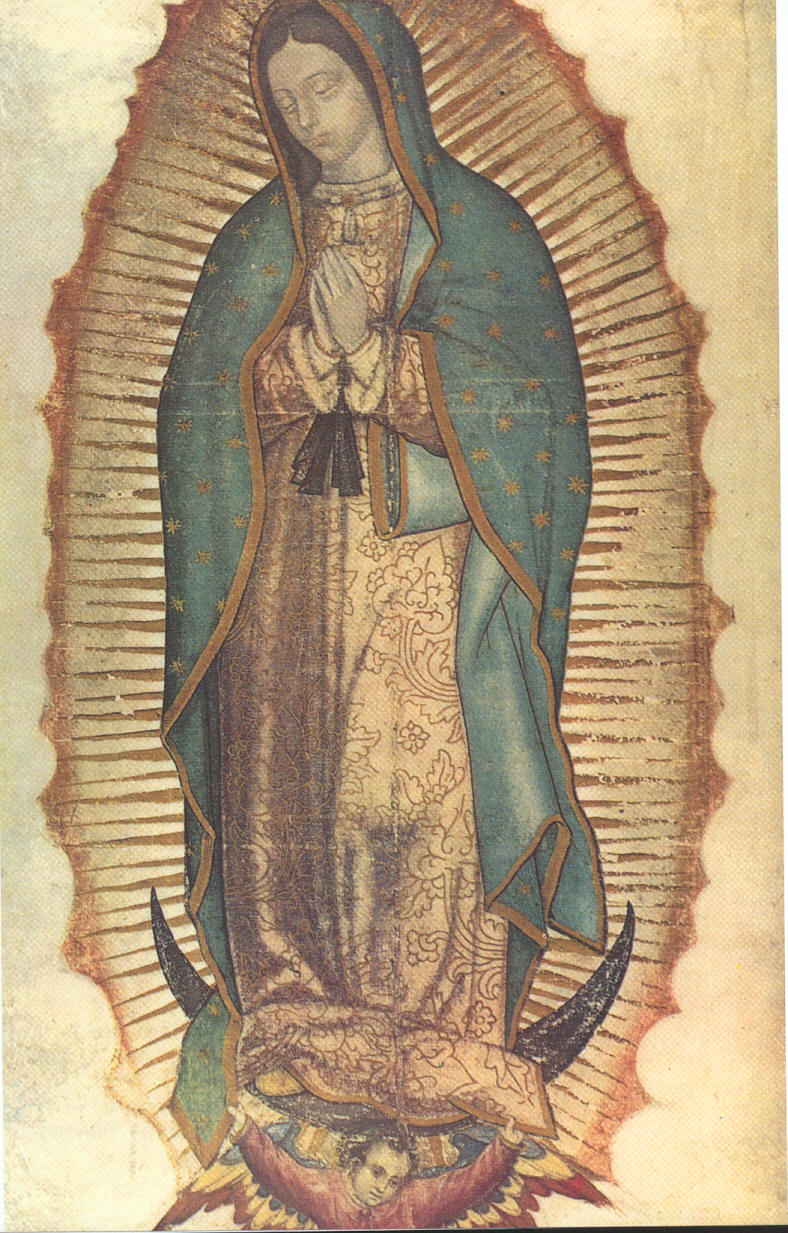
Marianismo derives from Roman Catholic and Hispanic American beliefs about Mary, mother of God, providing a supposed ideal of true femininity as the "absolute role model" for adult and young Hispanic/Latina women.

The power difference in the relationship between men and women in Latin America not only creates the social norm of machismo, but by consequence also creates its female counterpart, the social concept of marianismo, a concept supported and promoted by women in which the idea is that women are meant to be pure and wholesome. It defines standards for the female gender role in Hispanic American folk cultures, and is strictly intertwined with machismo and Roman Catholicism. Marianismo revolves around the veneration for feminine virtues like interpersonal harmony, inner strength, self-sacrifice, family, chastity, and morality among Hispanic/Latina women. More ideals regarding the female gender role held within marianismo in Hispanic American culture include those of feminine passivity, sexual purity, and self-silencing. Evelyn Stevens, political scientist, states: "[I]t teaches that women are semi-divine, morally superior to and spiritually stronger than men."

Marianismo derives its origins from the Spanish colonization of the Americas, as many social constructs from Latin America do. It emphasizes the perfect femininity of a woman and her virginity. The Virgin Mary is the ideal female figure, representing characteristics such as "semi divinity, moral superiority, and spiritual strengths all the which are expected from women under machismo and marianismo. The man is the head of the household while the "fragile" woman is submissive and tends to remain behind the scenes. This brings to focus the idea that women are inferior to men and are thus dependent on their husbands. As a result, they not only rely on their husbands for financial support, but in the social realm are put at the same level as "children under age 12, mentally ill persons, and spendthrifts" (265). By way of tradition, not only are women given limited opportunities in what they are able to do and to be, but they are also viewed as people that cannot even take care of themselves. Getting married provides a woman with security under her husband's success, but also entails a lifelong commitment towards serving her husband and her children.

While social pressures and expectations play huge roles in the perpetuation of the mariana construct, this ideology is also taught to girls as they grow up. They learn the importance of performing domestic labor and household chores, such as cooking and cleaning, because this will be the role they will play in their future families. These gender roles are very strong due to them being seen as normal and natural in a passive way making it something much harder to question. They are taught that these must be done well so that they can adequately serve their families and avoid punishment and discipline by their authoritative husbands just like their mothers did before them. Men exercise their authority with their demand for respect and power in the house. It is a woman's place to respect the wishes of their fathers, husbands, brothers, and sons. Thus, it could culturally be a norm to follow the rules of the man.

=== Generational cycle ===
As generations continue, the idea of machismo may diminish but will still be, to some extent, present. Further, research suggests that still in today's society, men continue to take roles that often leave women without a voice to express themselves or the power to portray. Some people identify that machismo is perpetuated through the pressure to follow the norm to raise children a certain way and instill social constructions of gender throughout a child's development. This is complemented by the distant father-son relationship in which intimacy and affection are typically avoided. These aspects set up the environment through which the ideology perpetuates itself. It creates a sense of inferiority that drives boys to reach an unattainable level of masculinity, a pursuit often validated by the aggressive and apathetic behavior they observe in the men around them and ultimately leading them to continue the cycle. As well as young girls observing the roles and relationship between their mother and father, leading them to perceive these roles as normal and natural, and then to continue the cycle in adulthood.

=== Sexuality and sexual orientation ===
For men in many Latin American countries, their perceived level of masculinity determines the amount of respect they receive in society. Because homosexual men are associated with feminine attributes, they are perceived with lower level of masculinity, and as a result, they receive less respect than heterosexual men in society. This, in turn, can limit their "ability to achieve upward social mobility, to be taken seriously, or to hold positions of power". Also, because homosexuality is seen as taboo or even sinful in many Christian denominations, homosexual men tend to lack a support system, leaving many unable to express their true sexuality. To deal with such oppression, they must make the choice either to conform to heteronormativity and repress their homosexual identity, to assimilate towards masculine ideals and practices while maintaining their homosexual identity in private, or to openly express their homosexuality and suffer ostracization from society. This creates a hierarchy of homosexuality corresponding to how much "respect, power, and social standing" a homosexual man can expect to receive. The more a man acts in accordance with the stereotypical heterosexual hegemonic masculinity, the higher on the social hierarchy they are. Because of the machista ideals of manliness men who do not meet those ideals can be labeled as locas or maricones (derogatory terms) regardless of their sexual orientation.

On the lower end of the hierarchy are the locas or maricones. These men are those that are deemed as effeminate because they do not live by the social construct of hegemonic masculinity and also publicize their homosexuality. As such, they receive little respect both in society in general and among the LGBT community. Many homosexual men resist being associated with the "loca" stereotype by either demonstrating overt masculinity or by ridiculing and distancing themselves from other "loca" men. A common Puerto Rican saying demonstrates this resistance: "mejor un drogadicto que un pato" (better a drug addict than a faggot).

Homosexuality is perceived as negative or weak within the machista ideal. It does not fit into the masculine attributes that machismo extols. This often leads homosexual or bisexual men living in machista communities to be reluctant about being open about their sexuality because of the negative connotation associated with it. Similarly, women who identify as lesbian face oppression from machista societies and family because they are viewed as defying traditional gender norms. Lesbians are often not recognized as capable of being mothers, therefore challenging the concept of familismo. Familismo, which is an idea in Latin cultures that ties an individual with a commitment to his or her family, and homophobia can sometimes cause in homosexual individuals the repression of sexual identity, family separation, and to hide their sexuality. Such situations may hinder personal shame and secret sexual actions that increases HIV and STI risk in Latino homosexuals. Regularly experiencing homophobia and low self-esteem have a connection with sexual risk. A survey conducted by the Virginia Commonwealth University found that men who had high machismo values or characteristics were more than five times more probable to participate in activities or behave in a way to put them at risk for contracting HIV or an STI.

Because of the negative connotations that come with identifying as homosexual, the definition of homosexuality has become ambiguous. By genderizing sexual practices, only men who are sexually penetrated during sex are considered homosexual while men who are the sexual penetrators during sex can maintain their heterosexual identity. Mexican American sociologist Alfredo Mirande highlights that within the Latinx community, individuals aren’t simply defined as gay, but instead “the power they have through a sexual act”. For instance, in Mexico, opinions on homosexuality vary. One perspective is that any men attracted to other men are equally shameful and negative. The other perspective is that only men who are the receptive partners in same-sex encounters are seen negatively. Also, in many Latin American countries, the media portrayal of homosexual men often play into the stereotype of an effeminate, flamboyant male role. As a result, the idea of a masculine homosexual man remains almost unheard of and privatized by the community and by society, which allows this stereotype of homosexual men as locas to persist.

== Implications ==
=== Mental health ===
There is accumulating evidence that supports the relation between the way men in Latin America are traditionally socialized to be masculine and its harmful mental and physical health consequences. Respectively, machismo, is sociocultural term associated with male and female socialization in Latin American cultures; it is a set of values, attitudes and beliefs about masculinity. Research suggests the gender role conceptualization of machismo has associations with negative cognitive-emotional factors (i.e., depression symptoms; trait anxiety and anger; cynical hostility) among Latin American populations. Similarly, a well-documented disparity notes Latino adolescents reporting higher levels of depression than other ethnic backgrounds. Research suggests this may be associated to adolescent perceived gender role discrepancies which challenge the traditional perceptions of gender role (i.e., machismo).

Enhanced understanding on associations between the gender role conceptualizations of machismo with negative cognitive-emotional factors may prove invaluable to mental health professionals. According to Fragoso and Kashubeck, "if a therapist notes that a client seems to endorse high levels of machismo, that therapist might explore whether the client is experiencing high levels of stress and depression". Therefore, "conducting a gender role assessment would help a therapist assess a client's level of machismo and whether aspects of gender role conflict are present".

Many counseling psychologists are interested in further studies for comprehending the connection between counseling for males and topics such as sex-role conflicts and male socialization. This high demand stems from such psychologists' abilities to make patients aware how some inflexible and pre-established ideals regarding sex-roles may be detrimental to people's way of regarding new changes in societal expectancies, fostering relationships, and physical and mental health. Professionals such as Thomas Skovholt, psychology professor at the University of Minnesota, claim that more research needs to be done in order to have efficient mediation for men through counseling.

Several elements of machismo are considered psychologically harmful for men. Competition is a widely talked about subject in this area, as studies show that there are both positive and negative connotations to it. Many benefits arise from healthy competition such as team-building abilities, active engagement, pressure handling, critical thinking, and the strive to excel. As these qualities and traits are highly valued by many, they are widely taught to children from a young age both at school and at home. Scholars also argue that men could be mentally harmed from competition, such as the one experienced by many at their job, as their impetus to rise above their peers and fulfill the breadwinner concept in many societies can cause stress, jealousy, and psychological strain.

Our well-being greatly depends on our mental health, which is influenced by a variety of aspects of our lives, including gender, culture, and religion. Women's mental health can also be greatly impacted by machismo. Women living in machismo-influenced environments often live in fear of being judged, harassed, or physically harmed. Suicidal thoughts, depression, and other long-term problems can result from this anxiety. Machismo frequently objectifies women, which diminishes their self-worth and can result in eating disorders and body image problems. Machismo encourages repressing feelings and has historically affected both men and women. The normalization of repressing emotions can lead people to feel that it is improper to show negative emotions, which can worsen mental health issues and increase stress levels. Additionally, because mental health is highly stigmatized in these cultures, women are discouraged from seeking therapy or counseling, which may increase their emotional distress.

=== Violence ===
Machismo has negative impacts when it is used to emphasize a man’s power and dominance in relation to the submission of the women in their lives. This dominance can be used to justify abuse, which is seen in the high rates of violence against women, and femicide in Latin America. The power of machismo in shaping gender roles can not only make these issues more robust to address, but also change the nature with which they must be addressed, requiring a shift from a legal focus to a focus on changing the gender norms regarding machismo in Latin America. "Machismo as a cultural factor is substantially associated with crime, violence, and lawlessness independently of the structural control variables" (26-27). One key aspect of Machismo's association to violence is its influence in a man's behavior towards proving his strength (57). While strength and fortitude are recognized as key components to the stereotype of machismo, demonstrations of violence and aggressive actions have become almost expected of men and have been justified as desirable products of being tough and macho. It can be implied that "if you are violent, you are strong and thus more of a man than those who back down or do not fight".

Violent encounters can stem from the desire to protect his family, friends, and particularly his female relatives that are vulnerable to the machismo actions of other men, (59). However, through jealousy, competitiveness, and pride, violent encounters are also often pursued to demonstrate his strength to others. A man's insecurities can be fueled by a number of pressures. These range from societal pressures to "be a man" to internal pressures of overcoming an inferiority complex, (59). This can translate into actions that devalue feminine characteristics and overemphasize the characteristics of strength and superiority attributed to masculinity, (59).

==== Domestic and sexual violence ====
In many cases, a man's position of superiority over a female partner can lead him to gain control over different aspects of her life. Since women are viewed as subservient to men in many cultures, men often have power to decide whether his wife can work, study, socialize, participate in the community, or even leave the house. With little opportunity for attaining an income, minimal means to get an education, and the few people they have as a support system, many women become dependent on their husbands financially and emotionally. This leaves many women particularly vulnerable to domestic violence both because it is justified through this belief that men are superior and thus are free to express that superiority and because women cannot leave such an abusive relationship since they rely on their husbands to live.

==== Sexually-transmitted infections ====
One implication of the machismo concept is the pressure for a man to be sexually experienced. Male infidelity is of common practice in many cultures, as men are not as expected to hold nearly the same level of chastity as women are. Meanwhile, girls are oftentimes brought up to tolerate an unfaithful partner, since it is a part of the machismo culture. As such, this puts populations at risk for transmitting STIs as men seek out multiple sexual partners with little interference from their wives or from society. The risk is further heightened by the lack of condom use by men who are both miseducated about the effectiveness of a condom's protection against STIs and the belief that this would not happen to them. This mentality also deters men from getting themselves tested to know if they are HIV-positive, which leads them to even spread STIs without even knowing it.

== In Cuba ==
=== Early beginnings ===
Machismo is a source of pride for men and they must prove their manliness by upholding their dominance in their reputation and their household. Machismo comes from the assertion of male dominance in everyday life. Examples of this would be men dominating their wives, controlling their children, and demanding the utmost respect from others in the household. Machismo has become deeply woven in Cuban society and have created barriers for women to reach full equality.

In Uva de Aragon Clavijo's, novel El Caiman Ante El Espejo, Clavijo claims that Cubans feel more power from the genital organs of past male Cuban leaders like Fidel Castro. Even though he represented a revolution, he was still a powerful and dominating man who ruled over the people. In the point of view of Clavijo, militarism and caudillismo, are what is to blame for Cuban machismo, as it established the ideology of the "leadership of the strongman" which proved to be successful in Castro becoming victorious in his revolution. Thus furthering that a male dominated political society is superior.

=== Effects ===
Because of the objectification of women, domestic violence is often ignored when women decide to seek help from the police. Domestic abuse victims are given psychological counseling to cope with their trauma, but little is done legally to solve the problem. Domestic Abuse cases or other violent crimes committed against women, are very rarely reported on by the media, and the government does not release statistics that show the people the extent of the crimes. The Cuban Revolution changed some of the ways the people of Cuba viewed women. Fidel Castro in his own words saw that the women were going through 'a revolution within the revolution and established the Federation of Cuban Women (FMC). This organization, headed by Vilma Espin, Castro's sister in law, helped women better establish themselves into the working world and in women's right issues. The FMC has continually advocated for women rights and in 1997 created the Grupo Nacional para la Prevencion y Atencion de la Violencia Familiar, a national group whose purpose is to study and find measures on how to get help for the women who fall victim to domestic violence. With the help of the FMC and the Grupo Nacional para la Prevencion y Atencion de la Violencia Familiar, women can file claims against their abusers at the Office of Victim Rights. They are also now able to get access to sexual abuse therapies. This by no way solves the issue of domestic abuse, but it is a turning point for the Cuban women who are now no longer feeling powerless in the fight.

Because machismo is so entrenched into the very systems that keep women oppressed, women in Cuba do not hold political or monetary positions of power. The role of women in revolutionary society were as subjects. Although the revolution allowed women control over their personal, professional, and reproductive lives there was a persistent view that Cuba was built by a brotherhood of men. This saw women as "revolutionary mothers" who were subalterns of the state. The idea that gender equality was surface level can be shown in the Codigo de la Familia which called for men to take a more active role in the household, but was rarely enforced. Another example of this surface level equality is shown in Guevara's book, "El hombre Nuevo"(1965). Women are first and foremost depicted as wives of revolutionaries, however they also have the additional roles of militants and volunteer workers. Guevara was connecting traditional Latin American gender concepts of femininity to the socialist revolution by stating that women's commitment to the revolution was not important for the outcome of the revolution but rather for their overall desirability to men. Guevara's book continues to outline the role of women in society by dictating how they should look for men in addition to what to look for in a man. The desirable Cuban man was seen as industrious and willing to serve the state when he was called upon. The Cuban man often had to participate in voluntary agricultural work to help the agricultural production of the state. This was tied to the idea that the Cuban "new man" was essential for the survival of a socialist state. The depiction of women and men in Cuban media influenced gender relations in Cuban society as a whole. The outcomes of the depictions and legislations brought forth by Guevara's "New Man" are shown in the role of women in revolutionary society which saw their role in the domestic sphere mostly unchanged and pre existing notions of masculinity and femininity still being dominant in the political theatre. While there were 48.9% of women in Cuban Congress, the political group that holds the most power is The Cuban Communist Party, which was made up of only 7% of women. In many cases, women who do have professional jobs are often funded by the Cuban state meaning they only receive about $30 a month. This means that women are employed but do not and cannot hold positions of power due to the men in power who benefit from staying in power. Machismo is mostly ingrained in domestic environments, so while 89% of women over 25 have received a secondary education, if a woman is a doctor, or a lawyer even after all the work she has done during the day, at home she is still expected to cook and clean and be the primary caretaker of the children. Many feminist scholars have described this phenomenon, which takes place in other cultures, as the second shift, based on a book by Arlie Russell Hochschild by the same name. Cuban males see no problem in leaving all the housework to their wives while they are allowed to go out for drinks with their friends. Machismo characteristics in men have given them power over women in the home, which leaves certain women more vulnerable to domestic violence committed against them. Cubans are now beginning to leave state employment, to search for jobs in tourism. These jobs produce a great deal of profit because of the wealthy tourists that visit the island and leave good tips. Cubans who were once professors and doctors are now leaving their old jobs to become bartenders and drive cabs.

From the inception of machismo from both the Spanish Empire and Portuguese Empire, machismo translates to mean macho and refers to male oppression over women. Moreover, machismo is an all-encompassing term for the dominion of the elite man over 'the other'. In this case 'the other' refers to women of all races and economic status, whom the macho sees as an object to protect. in contrast effeminate and gay men are not seen as worthy of protection but as objects to ridicule and punish sometimes with violence. Men who do not perform their gender in the "normalized" way are referred to as maricon, (a derogatory word meaning queer or fag), because their maleness is being called into question. Many of the anti-LGBT acceptance stems from The Cuban Revolution and Fidel Castro who had strong views over masculinity and how it fit in his idea of militarism. Fidel Castro once said on homosexuality in a 1965 interview with American journalist Lee Lockwood, "A deviation of that nature clashes with the concept we have of what a militant communist should be." That same year gay men in Cuba were being sent to labor camps because their sexuality made them "un-fit" to be involved in military service. Machismo has not only been a tool used to control women but also to punish men who do not adhere to societal norms, should behave as well. However, in the more recent years, the establishment of CENESEX (National Centre for Sexual Education) has been established so that the population of Cuba can more readily accept sexual diversity of all kinds, especially in terms of the LGBT people. CENESEX has grown in part because of the Cuban government and with the help of Mariela Castro-Espin, daughter of Raul Castro, 16th president of Cuba, and niece to Fidel Castro. CENESEX has sought to decrease homophobia in Cuba by increasing sexual awareness by holding social gatherings like anti-homophobic rallies.

=== In the media ===
In 1975, a new Cuban Law came onto the island: the Codigo de la Familia (Family Law). It was put into effect on 8 March 1975, 15 years after the Cuban Revolution. The new Family Law of 1975 helped a lot of women get jobs on the island and provided children with protection under the law so that child begging and homelessness amongst children was practically eradicated. The law also stated that it was required for both sexes to participate in domestic chores. But just because the law was passed, does not mean it was heavily reinforced, particularly in the domestic sphere. One of the aspects of the new family law was not only to create equality outside of the home but inside of it as well. This new family law was not received well by many people in Cuba. And many people lashed back against the law. These grievances reflected in the media that was made in Cuba, particularly, during the "Golden Age of Cuban Cinema". In revolutionary Cuba where public political discourse was limited, films provided a platform for political discourse in Cuba by tackling controversial issues in a complex manner. Films like De Cierta Manera exemplify these shifts in Cuban society through its use of a female director and subversive plot. The film sees a relationship blossom between a low-class mulatto and a middle-class pale teacher. The plot, "exposes and subverts the traditional notion of spectator identification and thus posits a truly 'revolutionary' and potentially subversive character representation." The revolutionary notions of the film can be seen through a romantic relationship sparking across racial and class lines. Subversive films like De Cierta Manera challenged the Latin American idea of Machismo. The film Hasta Cierto Punto (Up to a Certain Point) directed by Tomás Gutiérrez Alea delves into the dynamic on working class and bourgeois machismo is very telling of Cuban society and how class reflects on the attitudes towards machismo. It also problematizes bourgeois men who believe they are intellectually above everyone else, including issues on machismo and women's equality. The Film Up to a Certain Point establishes a need for the abandonment of machismo in order for Cuba to be a true socialist state. Although subversive films like these were released to cement the ideal "new man" in Cuban culture, some films like Retrato de Teresa challenge the idea of machismo, but depict the male view as dominant and instead depict the illusion of change. The abandonment of machismo is present in Cuban film although some scholars argue that it was merely surface level and represent the views of gender roles in Cuban society as a whole. Women's commitment to the revolution directly influenced their desirability to men. This led to hypersexualized depictions of women who abided by the revolution while showing non-revolutionary women as undesirable to men in mass media. Cuban cartoons depict desirable Cuban women as revolutionary, sexual, and voluptuous while depicting the undesirable Cuban man as Americanized.

==== Lasting effects ====
The aftermath of Guevara's "new man" ideology can be seen in the dynamics of post-revolutionary romantic relationships and society. In post-revolutionary Cuban society, men were in constant fear of infidelity as the importance of capitalism increased in Cuba. Now that monetary exchange had value in Cuba, daily necessitates were no longer provided for by the government which meant money was needed for day-to-day life. This meant that women would often leave their partner for someone who was wealthy or foreign because migration became an important part of Cuban society. Machismo is still present at this point and is embodied in men's paranoia, women were often controlled by their partners to ensure their faithfulness. The impact of this shift in gender is seen in Cuban society as a whole. New class disparities emerge amongst poor Cuban men, wealthy Cuban men, and tourists. Cuban women are searching for wealthy men which in turn attracts more wealthy tourists to the island, leading to a further dominance of monetary exchange in Cuba which leads to a further class disparity between rich and poor Cubans.

== In Puerto Rico ==
In terms of the presence of machismo in Puerto Rican society, men were to work outside the home, manage finances, and make decisions. Women were to be subordinate to their husbands and be the homemakers. Women would often have to be dependent on men for everything. Growing up, boys are taught to adhere to the machismo code, and girls are taught the marianismo code. This practice is also followed by Puerto Rican Americans outside of the island. Nonetheless, this is not the only aspect to Puerto Rican machismo. Machismo can be seen in various ways in Puerto Rico from the island's colonial history to the high cases of gender based violence that occurred in 2021. Because of this, new conversations about machismo are emerging specifically the discussion of how to handle it, what ways in which the next generation can learn about it, and the effects it has on society.

=== Colonial history and ties to machismo ===
When evaluating Puerto Rico's machismo culture it's important to relate it to Puerto Rico's colonial status, first to Spain and then to the United States. When becoming a colony of Spain, Puerto Rico gained the machismo principles Spain instilled. When Puerto Rico became a United States colony, the nation wanted to remedy the poverty Puerto Rico was in. This was done by situating poverty as the main effect of overpopulation. Thus, women's ability to reproduce was one of the ways the United States changed Puerto Rico's "culture of poverty".

=== Mid to late 20th century ===
While Puerto Ricans may be motivated by the progressive movements of the mainland, they base their movements on their unique situation in Puerto Rico. In the 1950s, industrialization caused men's employment rates to decline while women's employment rates began to rise. Additionally, from the 1950s to the 1980s, a field of white-collar women emerged, furthering the rise in women's employment. With their new contribution to the workforce, it was still under the woman's responsibility to continue domestic tasks and now also to contribute to household finances. This caused a shift in what was deemed acceptable in households. Before women would depend greatly on a man to provide for them, but as they acquired roles that required some extent of education and provided financial aid, they were able to become more independent.

In the 1960s when many Puerto Ricans were moving to New York, many women were forced toward single motherhood with values that encouraged traditions like marriage. However, women still emphasized the importance of independence and financial success. As an example, a mother would advise her children to marry someone who demonstrated they could be financially stable. This was something that brought a lot of tension and inner conflict with the concept of the machismo culture. In present-day society, this machismo culture is still repressed - in 2016, Puerto Rico was the only place where women made more than men, at $1.03 for every $1.

Scholars argue that examples like these where women move toward an independent life by being a single mother, prove that machismo and/ or marianismo cannot be concretely defined. Rather, it depends on a person's decision or circumstances in society rather than a belief they were taught and followed.

Rules enforced by Latin families that teach that young women should not be influenced by the dangers of the outside world, portray young women as vulnerable or in danger of being sexualized. Many times these strict rules are emphasized as some women experience pregnancy at a young age where they are said to not be ready to carry out the task of being a young mother. Young women may even lack support from their own household families and are blamed for not being properly educated. Puerto Rican families influenced by American culture may express or bend these traditional rules whether they educated their children based on the values and morals that they were taught.

=== 2021 gender-based violence rise ===
In countries where machismo is prevalent and deeply ingrained in society, gender violence is higher. In 2021, gender-based violence rose in Puerto Rico. This led to Governor Pedro Pierluisi declaring a state of emergency on the island due to an increase in gender-based violence from 6,603 cases in 2020 to 7,876 in 2021. Out of the many cases, the murders of Andrea Ruiz Costas and Keishla Rodriguez caused the public to question how gender-based violence was handled within Puerto Rico's judicial system. Andrea Ruiz Costas filed three court cases before her murder, all of which were denied. The judicial system accepts that, like every institution, it lacks in some instances. One of those factors is the judicial system's difficult process for filling a complaint. Many times this process is difficult for the victim due the lengthy process of filling the complaint and understanding the legal implications this process entails. After the government declared a state of emergency, conversations emerged about the root of gender based violence and the need for gender perspective learning to be included in Puerto Rico's Department of Education Curriculum. On 26 October 2022, the Department of Education announced a curriculum called Equity and Respect for All Human Beings which will take place every fourth Wednesday of the month during homeroom period. Though the program intends to encourage respect and equity, supporters for gender perspective learning clarify that it lacks in acknowledging terms involving gender equity and identity.

=== LGBTQ+ tourism, discrimination, and violence ===
In terms of tourism, Puerto Rico was seen as one of the best places to visit for LGBTQ+ tourists. However, the LGBTQ+ community is also a conflicting issue to the machismo culture. Machismo culture supports the image of the ideal man as heterosexual and overtly masculine. Hence, gay men pose a threat to that image of manliness, often leading to acts of hate, violence and discrimination towards the LGBTQ+ community. Puerto Rico is known for its strong Christian community, specifically Roman Catholic and Pentecostal, along with having smaller Jewish and Muslim communities. Due to changing times and influence from the United States, the LGBTQ+ movement has been a strong force for equality, which in Puerto Rico has not always been accepted, and even harmed in the process due to difference. One of these being the murder of Alexa Negrón Luciano, a transgender woman who in 2020 was mocked and eventually shot. Alexa's murder, classified as a hate crime, provoked a conversation about transphobia on the island. In relation to these conversations and the hope for a more inclusive Puerto Rican society, new gender neutral identifying terms are being used in Puerto Rico like substituting the vowels (a) or (o) in Spanish (many times the (a) in a word signifies a female, the (o) a male) for the letter (e) which is considered gender neutral, though it has its own share of criticism from some locals as they see it as promoting neocolonialism.

== In Chile ==
Machismo has been studied in the schoperías (taverns) of the copper mining regions of northern Chile. In these venues women are effectively barred as customers, and the men who work in the mines cultivate a sense of masculinity that tends to be more boisterous than their work conduct. Socializing is facilitated by alcohol consumption and the men, many of whom live away from their families, demonstrate their heterosexual legitimacy by talking about women's bodies and sexual availability or boasting about their sexual achievements. The shyer customers find that they are able to interact with friends and women in ways that they could not do outside for fear of rejection. Schopería owners consider themselves obligated to cater to the customers' preferences by hiring young and attractive waitresses, and the waitresses must defend against the customers' constant attention. Miners symbolize the ideal of the male worker, hostile to the bosses and to the moral authorities that have, over decades, tried to mold them into a disciplined and self-reproducing work force. Workers across the copper industry look to mining as the ultimate test of physical strength and therefore manhood. The miners often speak of the mines themselves as a jealous and punishing woman, and express fear that their wives are unfaithful. Fistfights and lesser acts of protest regularly erupt with the management, and to a lesser extent with workers who cross the lines of solidarity.

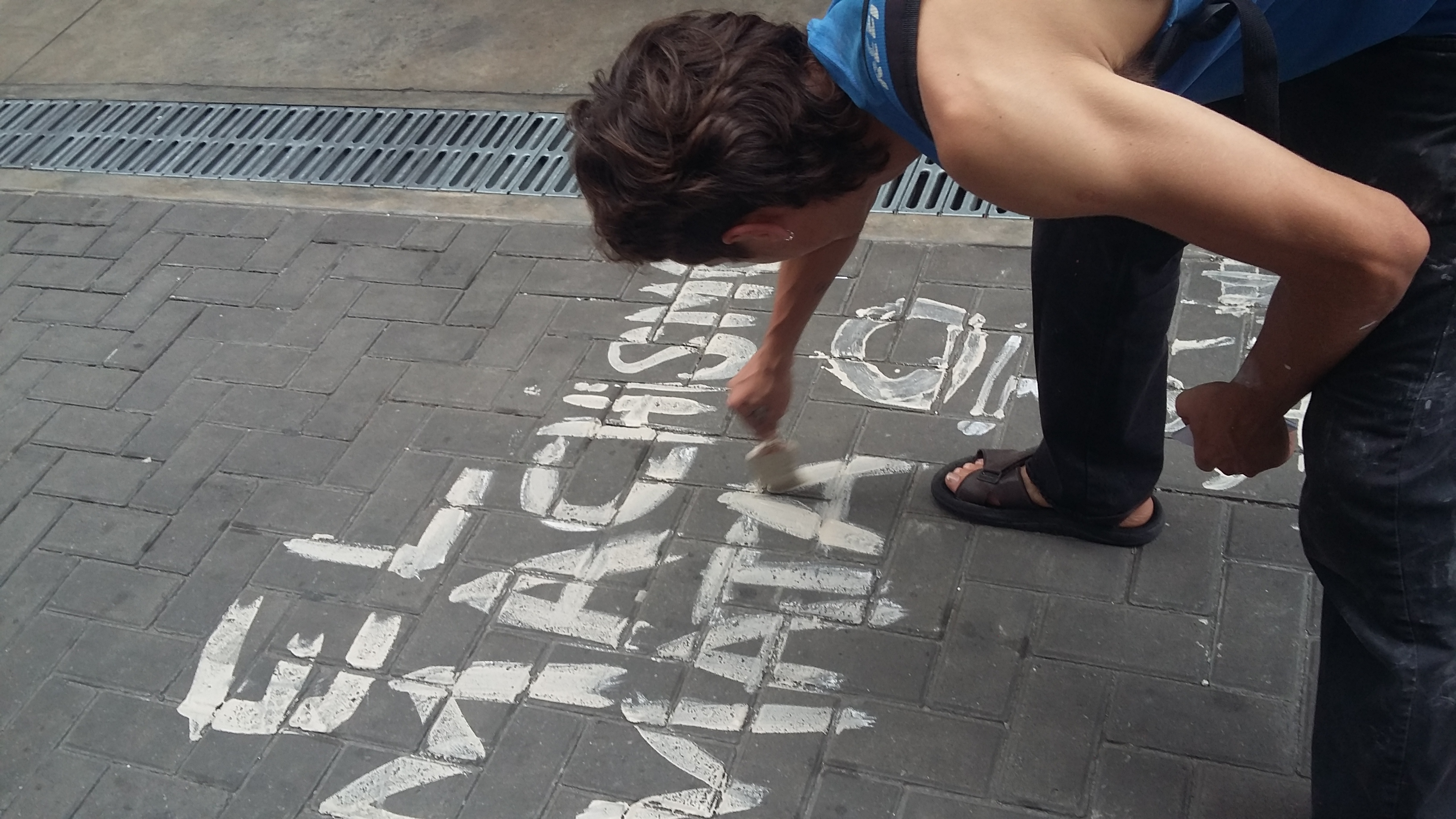
Graffiti on the street expressing "Machismo Kills"

Since 2007, every July the Red Chilena Contra la Violencia hacia las Mujeres (Chilean Network Against Violence Towards Women) implements its campaign "¡Cuidado! El Machismo Mata" (translating to "Beware! Machismo Kills") to raise awareness about violence against women, intrafamilial violence, and femicide.

== In Peru ==
Peru is one of the Latin American countries with the highest levels of machismo. This deep-rooted machismo stems from the way men are raised from birth, being taught that they are inherently stronger than women. Once they establish families, these men often take on the role of head of the household, expecting their wives to comply with their demands. This misunderstanding of gender roles leads to numerous issues, as boys who grow up in these environments frequently replicate their fathers' behaviors. Many men continue the cycle of violence and the belittling of women, viewing such actions as the norm because it's what they witnessed at home.

Unfortunately, this problem escalates when men become violent towards their wives, fueled by the belief that it is a woman's duty to fulfill all her husband's requests. When a wife asserts herself or refuses to adhere to unreasonable demands, she may face physical abuse until she submits to his authority. A study by Mamani, which compared two private universities in Peru and Chile with 303 students aged 19 to 21, revealed that Peruvian students exhibited a higher rate of machismo. The findings indicated that this machismo was not only influenced by personality but also by external factors such as alcohol and drug consumption.

Machismo is not the sole issue the Peruvian community should address; addiction also plays a significant role in boosting men's egos, allowing them to adopt the "macho" persona. Sadly, this addiction often leads to the abuse of women by their husbands. Many choose to ignore the problem, arguing that it doesn't concern them because they're married, or they blame the wives, believing that their behavior provoked the violence. Ultimately, some men resort to hitting women to assert their masculinity, thinking that they must “protect” their partner. They fear that if they don't maintain strict control, they will lose respect.

== Prevalence and acculturation in the 21st century ==
Despite machismo's documented history in Iberian and Latin American communities, research throughout the years has shown a shift in prevalence among younger generations. In Brazil, researchers found that while the majority of young men interviewed held traditional attitudes on gender roles and machismo, there was a small sample of men that did not agree with these views. Macho attitudes still prevail, the values place women into a lower standard.

Acculturation and education have been proposed to be a factor in how machismo is passed down through Iberian and Latin American generations in the United States. According to researchers who measured self-reported levels of machismo among 72 university students, 37 whom identified as Latino, the "somewhat unique population of college-educated students who have been heavily influence[d] by egalitarian attitudes, values, and norms" may explain why ethnicity did not directly predict machismo attitudes in two studies. Because education and acculturation of American values in Latino individuals may result in the development of attitudes supporting gender-equality, this demonstrates how machismo may gradually decline over time in the United States.

Moreover, researchers analyzed a large cross-sectional survey among 36 countries, including 6 Latin American countries, from 2009 and discovered countries with less gender inequality had adolescents that supported attitudes of gender-equality, though females were more likely to support LGBT and non-traditional genders than males. While the mean score of gender-equality attitudes was 49.83, with lower scores indicating less gender equality attitudes, Latin American countries scored the following: Chile (51.554), Colombia (49.416), Dominican Republic (43.586), Guatemala (48.890), Mexico (45.596), Paraguay (48.370). Machismo is associated with gender inequality. Therefore, this study suggests that Latino individuals living in their native countries may support more machismo attitudes than Latino immigrants adopting U.S. values of gender equality.

Masuda also studied self-reported measures of sexual relationship power among 40 recently immigrated Latino couples found data against machismo attitudes since women perceived themselves to have greater control and decision-making roles in their relationships. This serves as a stark contrast because machismo traditionally creates a relationship dynamic that relegates women to submissive roles and men to dominant roles. Again, acculturation may play a role in this dynamic shift because the couples averaged about 8 years since immigrating to the United States.

Acculturation has not only been associated with a decline in machismo, it has appeared to affect how it manifests and how it is transferred through generations. Recently, Mexican American adolescents in romantic relationships demonstrated "adaptive machismo", which consist of the positive qualities of machismo, such as "emotional availability, demonstrations of affection, desire to financially care for a female partner, responsibility in child-rearing, and/or to the community or friends", during conflict resolution scenarios. Furthermore, while Mexican American adolescent males were found to have certain values and attitudes, such as caballerismo, passed down by their families, machismo was not one of them. Because families are not teaching machismo, this implies that it may be learned from sources separate from the family unit, such as peers and the media. Ultimately, these findings suggest that machismo is changing in terms of its prevalence, manifestation, and socialization.

== Activism ==
=== Young Lords ===
Founded in 1969, the Young Lords were an organization of Puerto Rican revolutionary nationalists in Chicago and New York City. Working toward the liberation of all oppressed people, the Young Lords opposed racism, capitalism, and assimilationist ideologies. Seeking self-determination and community control of institutions and land, the organization's leaders made a distinct choice to denounce machismo in their revised 13-Point Program and Platform. Previously reading, "We want equality for women. Machismo must be revolutionary... Not oppressive.", the organization moved toward a more radical position, stating "We want equality for women. Down with machismo and male chauvinism". This revised version of the organization's ideological platform was published in their newspaper, Palante in November 1970 - thirteen months following the original platform's publication in October 1969.

The Young Lords opposed machismo because, as member Gloria González articulated in her 1971 Palante editorial, it serves to divide members of their movement. Further, the organization believed machismo serves as an extension of capitalism, a system they opposed. They understood the division of labor, including both reproductive labor and productive labor, to perpetuate the marginalization of women. They also understood the sexual objectification of women to be problematic and damaging to potentially revolutionary leaders. Moving toward this platform, however, would not have been possible without the Women of the Young Lords who pressured the organization's leadership to reject machismo during their East Coast Regional Central Committee retreat in May 1970. At this retreat the group studied and theorized, formally denouncing machismo because if power was to be transferred to the people, it would have to be the hands of all the people; and if this were to be possible, the Young Lords must reject "attitudes of superiority that brothers had towards sisters" and the "passivity of sisters toward brothers (allowing brothers to come out of a macho or chauvinist, superior bag)".

== Criticism and controversy ==
=== Controversy surrounding colonial connotations ===
There is controversy surrounding the concept of machismo as being originally from Spanish or Portuguese descent. The use of Spanish and Portuguese produces historical colonial connotations through its promotion of Spanish and Portuguese masculine social construction, when the term should be used to describe specific Latin American historical masculinities. However, the word machismo does resemble words in Spanish and Portuguese language which is why it is often associated with Spain and Portugal.

For example, the use of caballerosidad and cavalheirismo, to mean only the positive characteristics of machismo, is imbued with feudal and colonial connotations relating to colonial power relations. This is because the origin of the word resides in feudal Spanish/Portuguese descriptions of landlords that reached through and into the colonial era, exalts European culture in comparison to the so-called Latin American machismo.

=== Consequences of a one-sided negative depiction ===
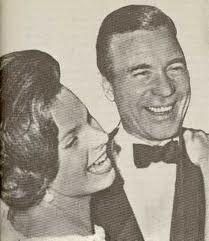
Porfirio Rubirosa, a Dominican playboy who helped internationalize the concept of the Latin Lover and Macho

Researchers are concerned regarding the unbalanced representation of machismo within Latin American cultures, and are now focused on creating a balanced representation. They have repeatedly pointed out the positive characteristics consistent with machismo, or caballerosidad: nurturance, protection of the family and its honor, dignity, wisdom, hard work, responsibility, spirituality, and emotional connectedness. Latin American scholars propose there are really two different constructs within machismo, one positive and one negative. The negative construct of machismo is based on the traditional Western concept of hyper-masculinity. Caballerosidad's characteristics are exalted, while machismo's characteristics are seen as predominantly negative.

The positive side of machismo (caballerosidad, cavalheirismo), refers to a connection to family and chivalry. However, the focus on the negative aspects and avoidance of the positive aspects of machismo coincides with the concept of marginalization and powerlessness of Iberian and Latin American, and more broadly Romance-speaking European culture-derived, narratives. This is because the focus on the negative aspects and the avoidance or ignorance of the positive creates a power dynamic that legitimizes the mainstream American hegemonic idea of masculinity as the correct or more righteous form of masculinity, and subjugates machismo as a degenerated form of abuse against women and backwardness. As a result, it can create a sense of powerlessness within Latino males in their expression of their masculinity.

Even as some researchers have discussed the distinction between positive and negative aspects of machismo, something interesting to note is that often when positive characteristics are described, those of caballerismo are brought up, which is different from machismo.

The characteristics that are usually captured by society within man often do include aggressiveness, power, dominance and more. However researchers point out that there are positive aspects that are also portrayed in machismo but are often excluded or hidden; these would include "responsibility, honor", and bravery which are not always seen. To further analyze this, for example with a man having responsibility, they portray their role to overlook their family and be their protection. They also have to continue the family legacy thus honoring their family through generations. This, however is a trait that could be diminished as could be the case when men seek respect and if they do obtain this respect, it could be that they potentially react with aggressiveness which leads into violence and abuse. This would then turn a positive characteristic to a negative characteristic of machismo since this act of aggression is externalized and men portray the power they seem to have over women. Because of this, it is usually the case that the negative perceptions of machismo outweigh the positives.

The phenomena of gender-based belief systems having negative and positive effects is described as ambivalent sexism, which is made of hostile sexism and benevolent sexism.

Academics have noted that there are consequences of only having a negative definition for Iberian and Latin American masculinity in popular literature. Researchers have suggested that, according to the anti-Catholic and/or Nordicist views dominant in American culture, Latin American manifestations of machismo represent "all that is wrong in a man".

=== Negative depictions in popular literature ===
Throughout popular literature, the term has continued to be associated with negative characteristics, such as sexism, misogyny, chauvinism, hyper-masculinity, and hegemonic masculinity. Scholars characterize "macho men" as violent, rude, womanizing, and prone to alcoholism. Authors from various disciplines typified macho men as domineering through intimidation, seducing and controlling women, and controlling children through violence.

For example, in American literature, an example of machismo comes from Tennessee Williams' character Stanley Kowalski, an egotistical brother-in-law, from A Streetcar Named Desire. In the 1947 play (and 1951 film adaptation), Stanley epitomizes the tough, alpha-male (hyper-masculine) archetype, socially and physically dominating and imposing his will upon his wife and her sister, Blanche Dubois. Bound up with Stanley's aggressive and occasionally misogynistic views is a strong sense of pride and honor which leads to his hatred of Blanche.

In the 1955 play A View from the Bridge by Arthur Miller, one of the main characters, Eddie, is a classic type who displays machismo. He wants to be the best of the men around him and when beaten, becomes very agitated and increasingly irrational. The negative stereotypes depicted in American literature are not representative of all the different layers of machismo. Although machismo can be portrayed as violent and aggressive throughout popular literature, scholars argue that the positive side of machismo, which includes its positive aspects is often not shown.

== See also ==
- Bro (subculture)
- Girly girl
- Androcentrism
- Identity politics
- Manosphere
- Men's liberation movement
- Patriarchy
- Hypermasculinity
- Toxic masculinity
- Masculism
- Radical feminism
- Closet homosexuality
- Majo
