= Up to a Certain Point =

Up to a Certain Point (English) Hasta cierto punto (Spanish)
- Directed by: Tomás Gutiérrez Alea
- Written by: Tomás Gutiérrez Alea; Serafín Quiñones; Juan Carlos Tabío
- Produced by: Humberto Hernández
- Starring: Óscar Álvarez; Mirta Ibarra; Omar Valdés; Coralia Veloz; Rogelio Blain; Ana Viña
- Cinematography: Mario García Joya
- Edited by: Miriam Talavera
- Music by: Leo Brouwer
- Production company: Instituto Cubano del Arte e Industrias Cinematográficos
- Distributed by: ICAIC (Cuba); New Yorker Films (USA)
- Release dates: 1983 (Cuba); 13 March 1985 (USA)
- Running time: 68 minutes
- Country: Cuba
- Language: Spanish

Up to a Certain Point (Spanish: Hasta cierto punto) is a 1983 Cuban movie directed by Tomás Gutiérrez Alea. It focuses on a theater director who starts up a relationship with a female dockworker. However, his machismo complicates matters. The movie is a general look at gender roles in Cuba as well as the conflict between machismo and the idealized image of liberated women under communism.
