= Marianismo =

Aspect of the female gender role in the machismo of Hispanic American culture

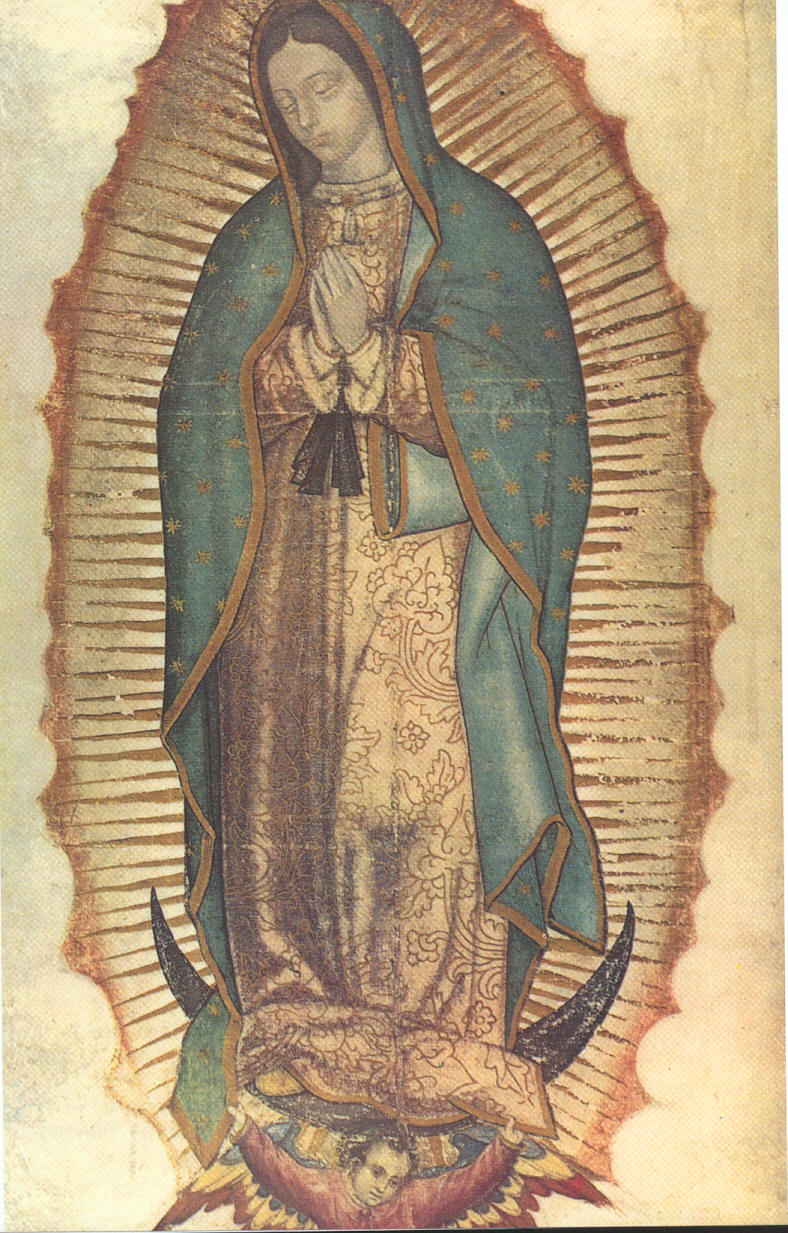
Marianismo derives from Roman Catholic and Hispanic American beliefs about Mary, mother of Jesus, providing a supposed ideal of true femininity as the "absolute role model" for adult and young women.

Marianismo is a term used in Hispanic American folk cultures that describes an ideal of true femininity, with characteristics derived from the devotional cult of St. Mary of Guadalupe, a central figure of Roman Catholicism in Mexico. It defines standards for female gender roles and is strictly intertwined with machismo and Roman Catholicism.

Marianismo revolves around the veneration for feminine virtues like interpersonal harmony, inner strength, self-sacrifice, family, chastity, and morality among Hispanic/Latina women. More ideals regarding the female gender role held within marianismo in Hispanic American culture include those of feminine passivity, sexual purity, and self-silencing. Evelyn Stevens, an American political scientist, states: "[I]t teaches that women are semi-divine, morally superior to and spiritually stronger than men."

== Origin of term ==
"Marianismo" originally referred to a devotion towards the Virgin Mary (Spanish: María). The term was first used by political scientist Evelyn Stevens in her 1973 essay "Marianismo: The Other Face of Machismo". It was coined as a female counterpart to machismo, the hispanic ideal of masculinity. Marianismo is the supposed ideal of true femininity that women are supposed to live up to – i.e. being modest, virtuous, and sexually abstinent until marriage – and then being faithful and subordinate to their husbands. Although Stevens was the first to use the term, the concept probably originated at the same as machismo, during the time of the Spanish colonization of the Americas.

In their book The Maria Paradox: How Latinas Can Merge Old World Traditions with New World Self-esteem (1996, G. P. Putnam), Rosa Maria Gil and Carmen Inoa Vazquez credit Stevens with introducing the concept of marianismo, citing the "ground-breaking essay written by Evelyn P. Stevens in 1973". They also discuss use of the term by academicians such as Sally E. Romero, Julia M. Ramos-McKay, Lillian Comas-Díaz, and Luis Romero. In their book, Gil and Vazquez use it as applicable across a variety of Hispanic cultures.

=== Evelyn Stevens' contributions ===
In her essay, Stevens defines Marianismo as "the cult of female spiritual superiority, which teaches that women are semidivine, morally superior to and spiritually stronger than men." She explains the characteristics of machismo: "exaggerated aggressiveness in intransigence in male-to-male interpersonal relationships and arrogance and sexual aggression in male-to-female relationships." Stevens argues that marianismo and machismo are complements, and that one cannot exist without the other.

==== Origin of Marianismo ====
Stevens believes that marianismo is rooted in the awe and worship of female bodies, particularly in the context of pregnancy, exemplified by early cultures. She discusses the various versions of holy Mother figures found through the world, such as Ninhursaga, Mah, Ninmah, Innana, Ishtar, Astarte, Nintu, and Aruru. In many of these goddess' myths, there are stories of the young male figure in their lives, be it a son or lover, disappearing. The response of the goddesses is typically grief, and as she grieves the earth is barren. Stevens argues that this may be an allegory or explanation of the seasons. Stevens points out that the monotheistic structure of Christianity did not produce a woman-figure to venerate, especially in early Christianity, which was deeply rooted in Hebrew beliefs. Around 431 AD, people began to exalt the popular figure of Mary, Mother of Jesus. As veneration of her grew, so did concern from Protestant leaders, who believed people were practicing Mariolatry.

When Spanish colonists brought Catholicism to what is now modern-day Mexico, a Native American man, who took the name Juan Diego, is said to have seen a vision of the "Most Holy Mother of God" on a mound in Tepeyac, north of what is now Mexico City. Before Christianity was introduced to the continent, Native Americans in the region believed the mound to be sacred to the Aztec goddess Tonantzin, or "Our Mother". The vision Diego saw was eventually named "Our Lady of Guadalupe" and made patroness of Mexico by Pope Benedict XIV in 1756. Our Lady of Guadalupe quickly gained prestige in Hispanic America. Father Hidalgo lead rebels with the famous Grito de Dolores in 1810: "¡Viva Nuestra Señora de Guadalupe, muera el mal gobierno, mueran los gachupines!" (transl. "Long live our Lady of Guadalupe, down with bad government, down with the spurred ones" (or Spanish Mexicans))

==== Mexican national identity ====
During the Porfiriato, marianismo was promoted by women to encourage the value in the traditional social roles relegated for women. Writers such as Laureana Wright de Kleinhans published articles that argued women were important agents to the nation's integrity by taking care of domestic duties with special emphasis on raising children. In La Reforma, marianismo was the primary rhetoric used to promote women's education for the purpose of teaching children to cultivate the right virtues and above all, be contributing members of society. The rhetoric's emphasis on educating women for the betterment of the nation bears significant similarities to Republican Motherhood.

==== Effects on women ====
In marianismo, Stevens argues, it is the bad woman who enjoys premarital sex, whereas the good woman only experiences it as a marriage requirement. Many women confess of sex with their husbands to their priests by referring to the act as "le hice el servicio" (or "I did him the service"). The belief system also believes that women should grieve heavily over family, encouraging women not to show any happiness or participate in anything that may bring them joy. Some have gained social prestige by mourning in these ways until they, too, die.

She also states in her argument that the characteristics of the ideal woman are the same throughout the culture when she claims that "popular acceptance of a stereotype of the ideal woman [is] ubiquitous in every social class. There is near universal agreement on what a 'real woman' is like and how she should act". However, she argues that most indigenous communities do not share the marianismo-machismo dichotomy.

Marianismo dictates the ideologies imposed on the day-to-day lives of Hispanic American women. Stevens believes that marianismo will not disappear anytime soon because Hispanic American women still cling to the role. She points out that men follow machismo because they are taught to by their mothers, aunts, and grandmothers. She also says that women encourage marianismo in each other because of the potential shame they could face for not fitting into its standards. Stevens believes many women find comfort in their personal and historical identities by partaking in this system.

==== Critique of Stevens ====
Evelyn Stevens' essay was very significant to this area of study. However, since its publication, her argument has been debated by other researchers and critics. Although her argument addresses marianismo in Hispanic America at large, many of the sources she uses mainly focus on Mexican culture, thus severely limiting her frame of reference. Also, she is criticized for implying that, despite other differences among various socio-economic classes, the ideal woman's characteristics are ultimately the same across social classes. Her critics claim Stevens ignores socio-economic factors, saying "her description of women as altruistic, selfless, passive, [and] morally pure" is inadequate. There have been some responses in the literature to the concept of marianismo that assert that its model of/for women's behavior is very class-based. In other words, the idea that men do all the hard work, while women remain idle on a pedestal, is something that rarely exists for the lowest classes. As Gil and Vazquez remind us, "most of her [Stevens's] data came from middle class Mexican women".

Researcher Gloria González-López says heterosexual norms are created, maintained, and changed in different national locations. González-López goes so far as to say:

Marianismo has done damage to our understanding of gender relations and inequalities among Latin American and U.S Latina women...Now discredited, marianismo was originally an attempt to examine women's gender identities and relationships within the context of inequality, by developing a model based on a religious icon (María), the quintessential expression of submissiveness and spiritual authority. This notion of Latin American women is grounded in a culturalist essentialism that does far more than spread misinformed ideas: it ultimately promotes gender inequality. Both marianismo and machismo have created clichéd archetypes, fictitious and cartoonesque representations of women and men of Latin American origin."

== Ten Commandments of Marianismo ==
Therapists Rosa Maria Gil and Carmen Inoa Vasquez presented the beliefs they observed many of their patients holding as intrinsic to marianismo: "Don't forget the place of the woman; don't give up your traditions; don't be an old maid, independent, or have your own opinions; don't put your needs first; don't wish anything but to be a housewife; don't forget sex is to make babies, not pleasure; don't be unhappy with your man, no matter what he does to you; don't ask for help outside of your husband; don't discuss your personal problems outside the house; and don't change."

== Five Pillars ==
Other researchers identify "five pillars" of Marianismo, or specific beliefs that "good women" must adhere to.

=== Familismo ===
Familismo (lit. 'Familism') is an individual's strong identification with and attachment to family, both nuclear and extended. To ascribe to this belief, Hispanic women function as the source of strength of families by maintaining their overall happiness, health, and unity. In order to maintain their families' reputations, Hispanic women are discouraged from sharing what is considered "family issues" with others. This belief causes many women who are abused by their partners to not report their experiences to law enforcement. Instead, they may talk about the abuse with family and friends. However, this disclosure to friends and family is linked to increased risk of future assault of Hispanic women. Therefore, adherence to traditional values of keeping matters regarding abuse within one's family discourage reporting and may have serious health implications for those experiencing abuse.

The concept of family is considered so important to marianismo women that those who attempt to intervene in situations of partner violence in marianismos are encouraged to view autonomy and independence as very westernized concepts, and are told to instead focus on listening and aiding women in the goals they create to avoid violence, in order to avoid alienating the women. Many of the goals stated by those interviewed were, rather than leaving a relationship with an abusive husband, to stop the violence, improve relationships with their partners, help their partners learn to be more supportive husbands and fathers.

Men and women in Hispanic cultures are expected to value their families, though the ways to express the value vary based on gender proscriptions. While men are expected to provide financial resources, protection, and leadership, women are told to provide emotionally and physically in part by raising children and doing domestic work within their homes.

=== Chastity ===
Virginity is viewed as an important feature, and by abstaining from premarital sex, women prevent shame from coming upon themselves and their families. Often, sex is associated with feelings of guilt and sadness in marianismo-abiding girls and women. This is because sex is often framed in a dichotomy of either being for procreation or eroticism.

Women are expected to be non-sexual and virginally pure. This means that women should strive for monogamy, sexual desire in long-term, committed (ideally married) relationships only, and should limit their exploration of their sexual identities only in heterosexual relationships. This often leads to an interpretation that women should remain with their partner for the rest of their lives, even if they are abused.

Women are also expected to be passive in sexual encounters, which is linked to lower condom usage and therefore higher risk of STIs, especially HIV/AIDS. Women are expected to learn how to have sex from their husbands, and if a woman shows too much interest or assertiveness, she is sometimes treated as "suspect".

=== Respeto ===
Respeto (lit. 'respect') is the obedience, duty, and deference an individual adheres to in their position of a hierarchical structure. This maintains the common Hispanic family structure, and provides individuals with a standard to how they respond to interpersonal situations. There is a golden rule, no faltarle el respeto, which tells individuals not to speak against those who are higher up in the hierarchy.

=== Self-silencing ===
According to marianismo, Hispanic women should withhold personal thoughts and needs in order to avoid disagreement. Adherence to this belief is linked with significantly higher rates of psychological distress, depression, and anxiety in Hispanic women and young girls. It also influences women to stay in violent interpersonal relationships. Many Hispanic women perceive that "keeping things inside" causes their depression.

==== Simpatía ====
Simpatía (lit. 'sympathy') is a value of peace keeping and "kindness" that calls for women to avoid disagreements and assertiveness to keep relationships harmonious.

=== Spiritual ===
This pillar focuses on the perceived ability, and therefore responsibility, given to women to lead their families in spiritual growth and religious practice. This pillar is considered to be very important to perceived "good mothers". Higher endorsement of spiritual responsibility of women and mothers is linked to anger, hostility, and anxiety in women.

== In the media ==
Very few studies on the role of marianismo in the media have been conducted. However, in more recent years, researchers are beginning to explore this cultural phenomenon. Researchers Jorge Villegas, Jennifer Lemanski and Carlos Valdez conducted a study on the portrayal of women in Mexican television commercials. Often women are portrayed as either those who adhere to the feminine ideal, and those who do not. These women are then categorized as good women and bad women, respectively. These "good women" are seen as nurturing, family-oriented, soft-spoken, even-tempered and sexually naïve, whereas the "bad women" are often the sexual targets of men. Another dichotomy presented by this study is dependent women versus independent women. The researchers found that "dependent women tended to display characteristics perceived as positive in marianismo (helpful, rewarded by their family) whereas independent women were more sexualized". A similar study by Rocío Rivadeneyra examined the gender portrayals in telenovelas. Her research found that in comparison to their male counterparts, women were seen as spending more time with children and were either homemakers or unemployed. Both studies, however, noted that women and men were portrayed with equal frequency in the media.

A study of commercials on Mexico's national TV found a disparity in the ways women are depicted based on whether they are dependent on another person to have their role (mothers/wives) or independent (single women/employees). Although both independent and dependent women are more sexualized than men, the study found that independent women are objectified and sexualized more than dependent women as a result of wearing significantly more torn clothing to expose the torso and explicit/implicit nudity and by wearing more tight-fitting clothes, low-cut/unbuttoned shirts to show cleavage, and nudity. Independent women's motivations for taking actions were significantly more for the approval of men and for social advancement than dependent women. In addition, in these commercials, dependent women are viewed in stereotypical feminine settings, significantly more often in homes and restaurants and less in stores and occupational settings than men. Dependent women are found in homes and outdoors significantly more than independent women who are seen in workplaces more often. Also, women were shown significantly more often as both the givers and receivers of advice and the receivers of help, with men most commonly giving help to others. Commercials reflect cultural views, and these may show understandings on women's expected roles. Portrayals of women as traditional has a real effect on what women and girls can perceive themselves doing and becoming.

== Criticisms ==
Marianismo presents a foundation for normal female behavior within Hispanic countries. Under Marianismo, women are expected to present behavior that shows compliance to male dominance, strong ties to morality (especially relating to the Virgin Mary), and willing to give up everything for the name of family. Like machismo, Marianismo sets up a list of rules that promotes how one needs to be when interacting with society, strongly encouraging a gap between the genders by reinforcing these beliefs in various ways throughout society. Hispanic people who are exposed to the constructs of Marianismo and Machismo are predisposed to behaviors normative within the Hispanic cultures of what constitutes being a man and a woman. Expectations of behavior begin to be evident before birth with these social constructs, liberating and constricting both genders to fit inside a bubble deemed appropriate by Hispanic cultural values. Men are viewed as providers and decision-makers for their family, while women are to provide emotional support to their families only.

Marianismo also plays a role in gender roles that may lead to increased incidence of gender-based violence in Latin American countries, which can portray women as submissive, and extensions of men who dominate them. This can result in women being victims of gender-based violence, especially intimate-partner violence* which is often defended by the belief that a woman's husband has the right to use physical or emotional abuse against her. Furthermore, Femicide in Latin America is an issue that has been prevalent for many years throughout the region. Gender roles, and the concept of marianismo shape attitudes towards women, thus determining how they are treated in society.

Hispanic women's experiences in life both hinder and improve due to Marianismo. They are more likely to exhibit higher levels for pessimistic views in life and developing depression. Yet, they are also less likely to attempt unsafe behavior, such as underage drinking and substance abuse. Restrictions placed on their expected behaviors instills women to remain quiet about their issues. If efforts build to push away from the social constructs behind Marianismo, criticisms appear from the outside community. Even without going against the norm, stereotypes of Hispanic women are conjured up, similar to men under Machismo. They are viewed as "exotic", implying they are secretly sexually passionate wanting to branch out from that ideology, or prefer to divulge in dangerous activities to make up for this "innocent" life they've been confined in, much like the archetype of the "sexy librarian". Furthermore, women can ostracize the woman fighting against the norm, claiming she is going against her culture and faith by her challenges towards Marianismo

In Hispanic countries, a woman who presents herself in society without a man is frowned upon, as a man is the basis of family life and having a positive association within the community. Machismo promotes aggression, dominance and entitlement – characteristics that can be applied when focusing on interpersonal violence. When applying interpersonal violence, Hispanic women deal with the abuse from IPV from fear of losing their husbands, their children's father and social status of admitting abuse to the outside world. Marianismo promotes women to be self-sacrificing, leading for them to accept abuse continually and remain quiet from fear of losing their livelihood and dependency from their husbands. Given these characteristics, men remain dominant and exert their power over their partner, continuing the cultural establishment of patriarchy within Hispanic cultures.

Studies conducted on marianismo have concluded that Hispanic women who ascribe to this particular female gender role are more likely to engage in high-risk sexual behaviors, gender-based violence, and experience negative mental health outcomes.

Jane F. Collier demonstrated that access to economic opportunity is a factor in determining to what extent Hispanic women may choose to conform to traditional notions of marianismo, and to what degree they are inclined to adapt them to new circumstances. As early as 1997, Dr. Rosa Gil and Dr. Carmen Inoa-Vazquez made reference to Nuevo Marianismo, which is to embrace the marianismo ideal of being nurturing and caring, yet breaking away from the barriers those characteristics previously presented. Coined in 1973, researcher Gloria González-López says that marianismo, as a theoretical category, is not only culturally chauvinist but elitist as well.

=== HIV crisis ===
According to Marianismo beliefs, women are expected to be naïve about sex, which means that many girls and women are not taught about the spread of HIV/AIDS. As a result women know very little about sex, including homosexual extramarital affairs of their husbands. Many husbands have homosexual relations as a way to prove their machismo. Most women in Hispanic American cultures with HIV contracted it from their sole sex partner, their husband. Regardless of the sexual monogamy associated with Marianismo purity a woman adheres to, her status as HIV-positive threatens the identity she wants to associate with.

Women often stay silent about their status out of fear of being ostracized by family. Women are often blamed for their husbands' contractions of and death from HIV. Women who are HIV-positive have the risk of their children being taken away from them, because their families often see them as too sick and dirty to care for them. Women often lose status if they are seen to be associating with people who are HIV-positive, because people with HIV are often associated with sexual deviancy and impurity.

=== Feminist criticism ===
Some feminists criticize the concept of marianismo, suggesting that it simply legitimizes the social conditions of women in Hispanic America by making it seem valid and normal. They also note that marianismo is often presented as everything machismo is not; therefore femaleness is put into "the realm of passivity, chastity, and self-sacrifice". They argue marianismo suggests that if a woman has a job outside of the home, her virtues and her husband's machismo are put into question.

=== Ambivalent Sexism Theory ===
According to Ambivalent Sexism Theory, sexism and women's low status in terms of autonomy and safety is maintained through two types of sexism, hostile and benevolent. Hostile sexism being the belief that women inherently have negative features, and benevolent sexism often being the belief that women have inherently delicate features that causes the need for protection. Marianismo and ambivalent sexism share similar traits, including the fact that women are given respect, high status, and protection if they conform to gendered expectations. Marianismo thus functions as a risk factor and a protective factor.

== Modern Marianismo ==
Hispanic and Latina women in the United States find themselves attempting to merge two cultures. "Latinas today are demonstrating ... "Modern Marianismo" (Gil & Vazquez (1997) referred to as "Nuevo Marianismo") which is to embrace the Marianismo Ideal (of being nurturing and caring), yet breaking away from the barriers those characteristics previously presented (for Latinas)." Damary Bonilla-Rodríguez says that values such as: Familia, Amor y Pasión (Family, Love and Passion) have allowed [her] people to overcome adversity across centuries, and highlighting successful Latinas such as Justice Sonia Sotomayor, Secretary Hilda Solis and others is essential to connecting Latino cultural values with mainstream American values.

Such change is not unique to the United States. In Andalusia, with exposure to more modern models in Spanish TV and advertising, in one generation, the focus shifted from traditional norms of expected behavior with the realization that "inequalities in income and lifestyle among villagers no longer appeared to rest on inheritance, but on urban, salaried jobs people obtained."

== See also ==
- Barefoot and pregnant
- Feminine psychology
- Feminism
- Good Wife, Wise Mother
- Kinder, Küche, Kirche
- Machismo
- María Clara
- Marian devotion
- New feminism
- Sexism
- Yamato nadeshiko
- Violence against women in Mexico

== Bibliography ==
- Stevens Evelyn P.; 1973. :Marianismo:The Other Face of Machismo in Latin America; in: Pescatelo Ann; Female and Male in Latin America, University of Pittsburgh Press, 1973.
- Villegas, Jorge, Jennifer Lemanski, and Carlos Valdéz. "Marianismo And Machismo: The Portrayal Of Females In Mexican TV Commercials." Journal of International Consumer Marketing 22.4 (2010): 327–346.
- Rivadeneyra, Rocío. "Gender And Race Portrayals On Spanish-Language Television." Sex Roles 65.3/4 (2011): 208–222.
- Montoya, Rosario, Lessie Jo Frazier, and Janise Hurtig. Gender's Place : Feminist Anthropologies Of Latin America / Edited By Rosario Montoya, Lessie Jo Frazier, And Janise Hurtig. n.p.: New York : Palgrave Macmillan, 2002.
- De La Torre, Miguel A. Hispanic American Religious Cultures. Santa Barbara, Calif: ABC-CLIO, 2009.
