= Tony Cortes =

Cuban American actor, TV producer and show host (born 1968)

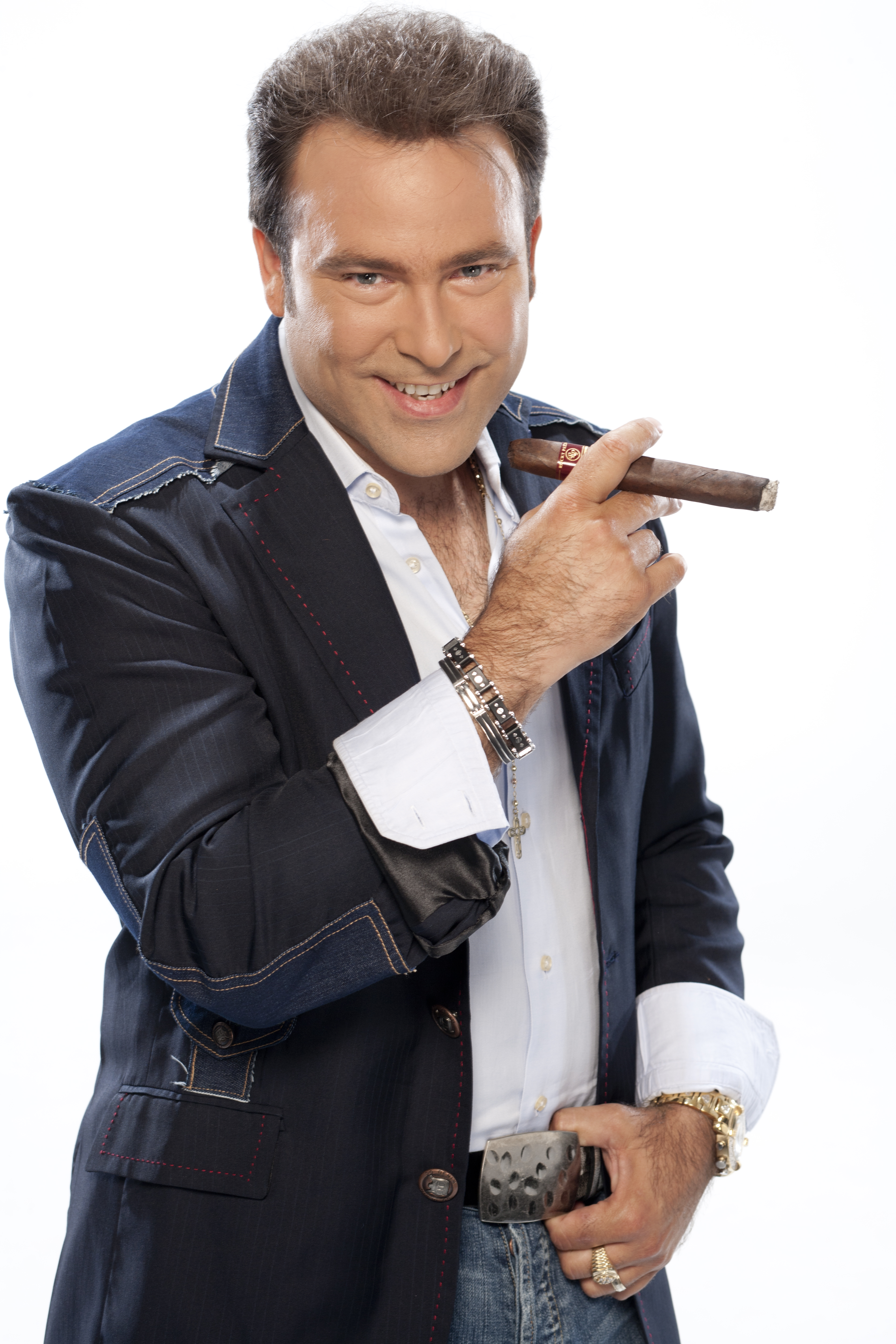
- Actor and TV host Tony Cortes
- Born: Antonio de Jesus Cortez Espina; August 31, 1968 (age 58); La Havana, Cuba
- Education: Arts (at Instituto Superior de Arte in Havana)
- Known for: Performing Arts, Journalism
- Notable work: Broadcast journalist Actor; Television producer TV Host
- Partner: Fiancee Mabel Toledo
- Awards: Emmy Awards; Mr. Televisión Miami; Premio Internacional "Ambiente"

Antonio de Jesus Cortez Espina (born August 31, 1968) is an actor in theater, film and television producer and host of controversial television shows. He resides in Miami, Florida.

== Career ==
Tony Cortes was born and raised in the neighborhood El Vedado in Havana. He began working in the entertainment industry at the age of eight, with the filming of the Cuban movie "Los sobrevivientes" (Survivors).

From that moment on he started doing work in film and television. He studied at the Instituto Superior de Arte in Havana, founded his own band BM Expresso, recorded several CDs, and produced for the record label Fania Records with Jerry Masucci and for the record label EGREM.

Tony Cortes appeared in soap operas, serials and other TV shows.

== Emmy Award nominations ==
Tony Cortes was nominated for two Regional Emmy Awards on television as presenter/host in the categories Best Historical Cultural Program News Chapter Robaina and Best News Program in Politics and Government Chapter "Mariel" of the 2011 Emmy Awards Suncoast Chapter.

=== Sobre mis pasos ===
The nominations were a prize to documentary Sobre mis Pasos, a serial -style reality show for the "Maria Elvira Live" Maria Elvira Salazar- aired in the national channel Mega TV (United States) and in which Cortes tells how he is finally allowed to enter Cuba after seven years of absence and not being able to even attend the funeral of his father in December 2009.

Cortes then decides to return to embrace his aged mother, visit the grave of his father and reconnect with all those things that are foreign: his people, his neighborhood and his friends.

This documentary series of ten 10-minute episodes shows the reality of Cuba, the feeling of its people, their daily life and the changes that are currently brewing in the heart of this people.
