= NWA Texas Women's Championship =

Professional wrestling women's championship

Details
- Promotion: National Wrestling Alliance
- Date established: March 5, 1950
Statistics
- First champion(s): Nell Stewart
- Most reigns: Nell Stewart (6 times)
- Longest reign: Nell Stewart (5 years)
- Shortest reign: Mars Bennett (3 days)

The NWA Texas Women's Championship is the National Wrestling Alliance's women's professional wrestling championship in the state of Texas.

== Title history ==
Key
No.	Overall reign number
Reign	Reign number for the specific champion
Days	Number of days held

No.	Champion	Championship change			Reign statistics		Notes	Ref.
No.	Champion	Date	Event	Location	Reign	Days	Notes	Ref.
1	Nell Stewart	March 30, 1950	Live Event	Galveston, TX	1	292	Stewart defeated Mae Young to become the inaugural champion.	
2	Mars Bennett	January 12, 1951	Southwest Sports	Dallas, TX	1	7	This was a two-out-of-three falls match. Nell Stewart was still recognized as the champion in San Antonio.	
3	Nell Stewart	January 19, 1951	Live Event	Houston, TX	2	(Note: The exact date the championship was vacated is uncertain, which means the title reign lasted between 2,508 and 2,538 days.)	Stewart left Texas in November 1955, and was recognized as the champion in November 1957. It is unclear if during this time Stewart remained the champion or reclaimed the title back.	
—	Vacated	December 1957	—	—	—	—	The championship was vacated after Nell Stewart left Texas.	
4	Lorraine Johnson	August 28, 1959	Live Event	Houston, TX	1	(Note: The length of the reign is too uncertain to calculate.)	Johnson defeated Laura Martinez to win the vacant championship.	
Championship history is unrecorded from August 28, 1959 to October 22, 1961.
5	Nell Stewart	before October 22, 1961	Live Event	N/A	3	502 (Note: The exact date that Steward won the championship is uncertain, which means the length of this title reign might be inaccurate.)	In Beaumont, Sweet Georgia Brown claims the championship as of January 30, 1963.	
6	Penny Banner	March 8, 1963	Houston Wrestling	Houston, TX	1			
Championship history is unrecorded from March 8, 1963 to 1963.
7	Nell Stewart	before 1963	Live Event	N/A	4			
Championship history is unrecorded from 1963 to December 3, 1963.
8	Sweet Georgia Brown	before December 3, 1963	Live Event	N/A	1		Brown was recognized as the champion in Dallas.	
Championship history is unrecorded from December 3, 1963 to November 6, 1966.
9	Kay Noble	before November 6, 1966	Live Event	N/A	1	309 (Note: The exact date that Noble won the championship is uncertain, which means the length of this title reign might be inaccurate.)	Noble was recognized as the champion in West Texas.	
10	Evelyn Stevens	before September 11, 1967	Live Event	El Paso, TX	1	(Note: The exact date that Steven lost the championship is uncertain, which means the title reign lasted between 356 and 385 days.)	This title change repeated itself on September 14, 1967 in Amarillo.	
11	Princess White Dove	September 1968	Live Event	N/A	1		According to the Odessa American, Princess White Dove was billed as champion in West Texas for defeating Evelyn Stevens, while Stevens continued to be recognized as champion in East Texas.	
Championship history is unrecorded from September 1968 to February 11, 1969.
12	Evelyn Stevens	before February 11, 1969	Live Event	N/A	2	144 (Note: The exact date that Stevens won the championship is uncertain, which means the length of this title reign might be inaccurate.)		
13	Mary DeLeon	July 5, 1969	Live Event	San Antonio, TX	1	71 (Note: The exact date that DeLeon lost the championship is uncertain, which means the length of this title reign might be inaccurate.)		
14	Evelyn Stevens	before September 14, 1969	Live Event	N/A	3	258 (Note: The exact date that Stevens won the championship is uncertain, which means the length of this title reign might be inaccurate.)		
15	Betty Nicoli	before May 30, 1970	Live Event	Houston, TX	1		Kay Noble was billed as champion in Longview, at least between March 9, 1971 and August 31, 1971.	
Championship history is unrecorded from May 30, 1970 to November 22, 1970.
16	Vivian Vachon	before November 22, 1970	Live Event	N/A	1	129 (Note: The exact date that Vachon won and lost the championship is uncertain, which means the length of this title reign might be inaccurate.)		
17	Marie LaVerne	before March 31, 1971	Live Event	N/A	1	(Note: The exact date that DeLeon won and lost the championship is uncertain, which means the length of this title reign, which allegedly is between 458 and 488 days, might be inaccurate.)	It is possible that LaVerne was awarded the championship after Vivian Vachon moved to California in February 1972.	
18	Kay Noble	July 1972	Live Event	N/A	2	(Note: The exact date that Noble won the championship is uncertain, which means the title reign lasted between <1 and 5 days.)		
19	Marie LaVerne	July 6, 1972	Live Event	Amarillo, TX	2	771		
20	Kay Noble	August 16, 1974	NWA Western States	Abilene, TX	3		Noble won the championship after LaVerne no-showed at the event.	
Championship history is unrecorded from August 16, 1974 to April 14, 1976.
21	Sylvia Hackney	before April 14, 1976	Live Event	N/A	1			
Championship history is unrecorded from April 14, 1976 to August 18, 1976.
22	Marie LaVerne	before August 18, 1976	Live Event	N/A	3			
Championship history is unrecorded from August 18, 1976 to October 21, 1977.
23	Susan Green	October 21, 1977	Live Event	Houston, TX	1		Green defeated Joyce Grable to win the vacant championship.	
Championship history is unrecorded from October 21, 1977 to March 24, 1978.
24	Joyce Grable	March 24, 1978	Live Event	Houston, TX	1	203	Either Grable defeated Leilani Kai for the championship or Grable was the champion at the time, who successfully defended the title against Kai.	
25	Suzette Ferreira	October 13, 1978	Live Event	Houston, TX	1			
25	Vicki Williams	January 28, 1979	Live Event	Houston, TX	1		Either Williams defeated Suzette Ferreira for the championship or Grable was the champion at the time, who successfully defended the title against Ferreira.	
Championship history is unrecorded from January 28, 1979 to November 22, 1980.
26	Pepper Torres	November 22, 1980	Live Event	Houston, TX	1		Either Torres defeated Leilani Kai for the championship or Grable was the champion at the time, who successfully defended the title against Kai.	
Championship history is unrecorded from November 22, 1980 to February 1981.
27	Susan Green	before February 1981	Live Event	Houston, TX	2	(Note: The exact date that Green won the championship is uncertain, which means the length of this title reign, which allegedly is between <1 and 26 days, might be inaccurate.)		
28	Evelyn Stevens	February 27, 1981	Live Event	Houston, TX	4			
—	Vacated	1981 – 1983	—	—	—	—	The year that the championship was vacated is uncertain.	
29	Velvet McIntyre	February 13, 1983	Live Event	San Antonio, TX	1	(Note: The exact date that McIntyre lost the championship is uncertain, which means the title reign lasted between 566 and 595 days.)		
30	Evelyn Stevens	September 1984	Live Event	Houston, TX	5			
—	Deactivated	1984	—	—	—	—	The championship was deactivated in 1984.	

== See also ==
- Jim Crockett Promotions
- National Wrestling Alliance
