= Carmen Inoa Vazquez =

Latina psychologist, professor, and author

Carmen Inoa Vazquez (born July 16, 1942) is a Latina psychologist, professor, and author. She is best known for her work exploring and promoting Latin American mental health.

== Early life and education ==
Carmen Inoa Vazquez was born on July 16, 1942, in Bonao, Dominican Republic. After emigrating to the United States in 1958 at the age of 16, she attended Queens College at the City University of New York, where she graduated cum laude with her Bachelor of Arts in 1976. Vazquez continued her education at City University of New York, where she earned her PhD in clinical psychology in 1981. She currently resides in New York City.

== Career ==
Vazquez's research and clinical expertise are in the area of multiculturalism, bilingualism, and Latin American mental health. She is a clinical and forensic psychologist. She is the founder of the Bilingual Treatment Program Clinic at Bellevue Hospital and the Institute for Multicultural Behavioral Health. Vazquez is a professor of clinical psychiatry at City University of New York and New York University School of Medicine. Vazquez has also held academic positions at New School and State University of New York as a professor of psychology.

== Publications ==
In addition to numerous empirical and theoretical articles published in academic journals, Vazquez has published three books, including Parenting with Pride Latino Style, The Maria Paradox, and Grief Therapy with Latinos: Integrating Culture for Clinicians. She has contributed to and served as an editor for other books, including Latina Psychologists: Thriving in the Cultural Borderlands.

Published in 1997, The Maria Paradox: How Latinas Can Merge Old World Traditions with New World Self Esteem uses clinical case examples to outline the various difficulties faced by Latinas as they work to navigate conflict between marianismo ideals and the cultural expectations of the United States. Through the lens of social psychology and feminist psychology, the book offers guidance about how these women might achieve empowerment by integrating two seemingly disparate ways of life. The book has been criticized for its lack of nuance regarding generational differences and attention to the role of social class. The Maria Paradox (La Paradoja de Maria: Como La hispana puede fortalecer su autoesti ma sin abandonar sus tradiciones) was published in Spanish in 2002.

Grief Therapy with Latinos: Integrating Culture for Clinicians was published in 2011 and provides practical guidance to therapists who wish to provide culturally sensitive care to Latin Americans experiencing grief. The book pays particular attention to the ways that collectivism influences the expression of various emotions associated with loss and explores how clinicians can integrate knowledge regarding their clients' language, immigration, acculturation, and traditional cultural beliefs into therapy.

Vazquez published Parenting with Pride Latino Style in 2009. In the book, Vazquez outlines an approach to parenting that integrates traditional Hispanic values into an American cultural context, which she terms New Traditionalism (El Nuevo Tradicionalismo).
