= The Twelve Chairs (1970 film) =

1970 American comedy film by Mel Brooks

- VHS cover
- Directed by: Mel Brooks
- Screenplay by: Mel Brooks
- Based on: The Twelve Chairs by Ilf and Petrov
- Produced by: Sidney Glazier; Michael Hertzberg
- Starring: Frank Langella; Ron Moody; Dom DeLuise
- Cinematography: Djordje Nikolic
- Edited by: Alan Heim
- Music by: John Morris
- Distributed by: UMC (Universal Marion Corporation) Pictures
- Release date: October 28, 1970
- Running time: 93 minutes
- Country: United States
- Language: English
- Budget: $1.5 million

The Twelve Chairs is a 1970 American comedy film directed and written by Mel Brooks, and starring Frank Langella, Ron Moody and Dom DeLuise. The film is one of at least eighteen film adaptations of the Soviet 1928 novel The Twelve Chairs by Ilf and Petrov.

== Plot ==
In the Soviet Union in 1927, Ippolit Matveyevich Vorobyaninov, an impoverished aristocrat from Imperial Russia now working as a local village bureaucrat, is summoned to his mother-in-law's deathbed. She reveals that she has sewn the family's jewels into the seat cushion of one of the twelve chairs from the family's dining room set to prevent the Bolsheviks from getting them. After hearing the dying woman's confession, the Russian Orthodox priest Father Fyodor, who had arrived to administer the last rites, decides to abandon the Church and attempt to steal the treasure for himself.

Shortly afterward, in the town of Stargorod, where Vorobyaninov's former mansion is, a homeless con artist, Ostap Bender, meets the dispossessed nobleman and manipulates his way into a partnership in his search for the family's riches. Together, they learn from Vorobyaninov’s former servant, Tikon, that the state seized eleven of the chairs, along with the rest of the estate, after the Russian Revolution.

Vorobyaninov returns to his old home and discovers Father Fyodor attempting to steal the remaining chair. In the ensuing struggle, the chair is torn open, revealing nothing, and Fyodor escapes. Posing as an official of the Department of Chairs, Bender tricks Fyodor into a wild goose chase to recover a similar set of eleven chairs in the possession of an engineer in Siberia. Fyodor makes the long journey by train to Irkutsk only to be thrown out of the engineer's house. When the engineer is reassigned to a post at Yalta on the Black Sea, Fyodor follows him and buys the counterfeit chairs (on the condition that the engineer and his wife never see him again), only to find them empty, and descends into aimless wandering.

Meanwhile, Vorobyaninov and Bender find the eleven remaining chairs in a museum in Moscow, just as seven are taken away to be sold. The remaining four do not contain the jewels. One of the seven is bought by a stranger whom Vorobyaninov fails to catch. The other six are sold to a traveling theater troupe, and, posing as actors, they manage to open three chairs before being interrupted. To keep up the ruse, Vorobyaninov agrees to perform in the troupe's play, but succumbs to stage fright, and he and Bender are thrown off the troupe's boat.

The two manage to reach Yalta, where the troupe docks next, and convince the manager's assistant, Sevitsky, to sell them the three remaining chairs for thirty rubles. Inspired by a statue of Dostoyevsky, Bender convinces Vorobyaninov to fake an epileptic seizure, compelling the townspeople to raise the money. The two buy two of the chairs from Sevitsky, who reveals he sold the third to a high rope performer at a circus. These two chairs also prove empty. After Vorobyaninov and Bender retrieve the chair from the circus, they encounter Father Fyodor, who frantically climbs up a mountain with the chair. After finding out it doesn't contain the jewels, he is unable to get down without help. Vorobyaninov and Bender leave him to his fate.

Vorobyaninov and Bender return to Moscow, where they discover the last chair in a recreational center for railway workers, which is inconvenient due to the presence of so many witnesses. Vorobyaninov and Bender return after closing time, entering through a window Bender had secretly unlocked earlier. Bender carefully and quietly opens the chair cushion and finds it empty. A watchman finds them, and Vorobyaninov demands to know what happened to the jewels. The watchman explains that the jewels they accidentally found were used to finance the recreation center's construction. In a rage, Vorobyaninov smashes the chair to pieces and assaults an officer the watchman has summoned. After admonishing him for hitting a policeman, Bender leads the way, and they escape into the night.

The next day, Bender proposes that he and Vorobyaninov go their separate ways, since they are already targeted by the authorities. In a desperate attempt to keep Bender from leaving, Vorobyaninov flings the remains of the last chair into the air and collapses to the ground, once again feigning an epileptic seizure. Attracted by the crowd and understanding what Vorobyaninov is doing, Bender calls for the crowd's attention and begs the passersby to give generously, cementing their partnership in crime.

== Cast ==
- Ron Moody as Ippolit Matveyevich Vorobyaninov
- Frank Langella as Ostap Bender
- Dom DeLuise as Father Fyodor
- Andreas Voutsinas as Nikolai Sestrin
- Diana Coupland as Madame Bruns
- David Lander as Engineer Bruns
- Vlada Petric as Sevitsky
- Elaine Garreau as Claudia Ivanovna
- Robert Bernal as Curator
- Will Stampe as Night Watchman
- Mel Brooks as Tikon

== Production ==
=== Development ===
Brooks met with a gourmet society consisting of Mario Puzo, Joseph Heller, Speed Vogel, and Julius Green every Tuesday night in Chinatown, Manhattan throughout the 1950s and 1960s. During a club meeting, Green gave Brooks his copy of the novel The Twelve Chairs, the first of three books by Ilf and Petrov, and told Brooks it might work as a movie. Brooks was skeptical but changed his mind after reading it.

Brooks decided the movie needed a song over the opening titles, and considered hiring a songwriter to write the lyrics. His wife, Anne Bancroft, persuaded Brooks to write it himself by reminding him that he wrote The Producers and its songs. He got the idea for the song's title, "Hope for the Best, Expect for the Worst", from the movie's Russian setting, and based the melody on Johannes Brahms's Hungarian Dance No. 4 in B Minor, which is in turn based on Béla Kéler's csárdás "Bártfai emlék". According to Brooks, the song's first eight bars are taken directly from Brahms, but the interlude and the release are original.

In the novel, Vorobyaninov murders Bender upon discovering the final chair. Brooks said in an interview:

You don't need to go out depressed after an hour or two of seeing a movie. I never was going to use [the novel's ending]. I was always going to have Ostap see the light and come to the aid and rescue of poor Vorobyaninov. So that was my switch on it. For me, it worked better.

=== Casting ===
Brooks wanted Alastair Sim as Vorobyaninov, Albert Finney as Bender, and Peter Sellers as Father Fyodor, but they were all unavailable. Brooks asked Gene Wilder to play Vorobyaninov, but Wilder thought he was too young for the part, telling Brooks that Vorobyaninov should be played by a man who looked like he had seen life. Looking for a replacement for Fyodor, Bancroft saw Dom DeLuise on television and recommended him to Brooks. Brooks's first meeting with DeLuise lasted four and a half hours. DeLuise said of it: "Mr. Brooks said that Peter Sellers was supposed to play this part, but even if he did, we would be friends forever." Bancroft introduced Brooks to Frank Langella, who had worked with her on the stage drama A Cry with Players and an experimental stage adaptation of The Skin of Our Teeth. Langella helped Brooks cast Bender by suggesting actors. Brooks eventually gave up and told Langella: "Oh, the hell with it. You do it." Langella took Brooks to a showing of Oliver!, which starred Ron Moody as Fagin. He told Brooks, "There’s your Vorobyaninov."

=== Filming ===
Principal photography for the film took place in Yugoslavia, primarily in the Belgrade region, including the present-day Croatian city Dubrovnik, from 25 August to mid-November 1969. Production began at Kosutnjak Studios in Belgrade, where Brooks was given a crew of either 80 or 1,000 people after negotiating with the Yugoslav government. The crew could not understand Brooks because he spoke only English. During filming in Dubrovnik of a scene where DeLuise destroys some of the chairs, Brooks, frustrated by a difficult shot, threw his director's chair into the Adriatic Sea. This infuriated the crew, who stopped working and threatened to strike. Confused, Brooks asked the cinematographer, Djordje Nikolic, why this was happening. Nikolic responded in a whisper: "You've just thrown the people's chair into the Adriatic. This is a communist country. Everything belongs to the people. The cameras, the celluloid. You’re making a people's picture." Brooks replied: "Tell them I profoundly apologize for hurling the people's chair into the Adriatic. I'll never do that again. And I'd like to extend my profound regrets." After reconciling with the crew, they all toasted to Vinjak and got drunk, spending the rest of the day carousing and kissing. Brooks said he "learned to respect the people's chair".

Brooks had an energetic directing style. When a tree obstructed a shot, he tried to pull it out of the ground. In a scene where Langella was instructed to row a boat across the moonlight, he went so far into the ocean that, at 3 a.m., Brooks entered the ocean and swam to find him. Being of Russian Jewish descent, Brooks relished his time in Yugoslavia and felt like he had come home. He called the filming of the movie a "great, great adventure".

Langella fell while picking up Moody in the filming of a scene, cutting his buttocks. While he was recovering in bed, DeLuise entered his room dressed as a nurse, and said to him: "How do you do? I'm Nurse DeLuise. I'm here to tend your wounds." Langella was paid very little, joking that it was "about 45 cents".

== Release ==
=== Reception ===
The Twelve Chairs received generally positive reviews from critics. On Rotten Tomatoes, it has an 87% approval score based on 15 reviews, with an average rating of 6.6/10.

Vincent Canby of The New York Times wrote: "For some reason, this sort of comedy of physical insult seemed much funnier to me in the Broadway world of The Producers, which is really aggressive and nasty and cheap, than in a Russia that is not too far removed from the world of Sholem Aleichem." Roger Ebert of the Chicago Sun-Times gave the film four stars out of four and wrote that while "you do laugh a lot ... It's not going for the laughs alone. It has something to say about honor among thieves, and by the end of the film we can sense a bond between the two main characters that is even, amazingly, human." Gene Siskel of the Chicago Tribune also gave the film four stars out of four, finding it not only funny but remarkable for "the quality of [Brooks's] direction, not even considering that The Twelve Chairs is only his second film. Brooks is in complete control of the many film techniques—visual and dramatic—he employs: slow motion, speed-ups and sight gags clearly borrowed from the silent era." Charles Champlin of the Los Angeles Times wrote, "despite some nicely farcical and stylized moments—many of them provided by Brooks himself in a cameo role as a drunken servant—the movie's first half isn't strong enough to override a thin and disappointing second half." Gary Arnold of The Washington Post found the film "much more consistent and fluid than Brooks' first film, The Producers. You don't gyrate as wildly between inspired and mediocre bits, but the 'wild' bits, the idees fixes, are still there, performed brilliantly by Moody and DeLuise and Brooks himself." Richard Combs of the Monthly Film Bulletin wrote that DeLuise "simpers and slavers to great effect as the piously greedy Father Fyodor ... DeLuise, in fact, considerably outshines the two leads." John Simon called The Twelve Chairs "a model of how not to make a comedy".

Brooks considers The Twelve Chairs to be an exceptional work of his, ranking it with The Producers and Life Stinks as the movies he is proudest of making and one that more people should watch.

=== Box office ===
The film opened at the Tower East in New York and the Beverly Cinema in Los Angeles, grossing $40,000 in its first week.

=== Awards ===
Langella won the National Board of Review Award for Best Supporting Actor. Brooks was nominated by the Writers Guild of America for Best Comedy Adapted from Another Medium.
