= The Survivors (1979 film) =

1979 film

- Directed by: Tomás Gutiérrez Alea
- Written by: Tomás Gutiérrez Alea; Antonio Benitez Rojo
- Produced by: Evelio Delgado
- Starring: Enrique Santiesteban
- Cinematography: Mario García Joya
- Edited by: Nelson Rodríguez
- Release date: 6 January 1979
- Running time: 130 minutes
- Country: Cuba
- Language: Spanish

The Survivors (Spanish: Los sobrevivientes) is a 1979 Cuban drama film directed by Tomás Gutiérrez Alea. It was entered into the 1979 Cannes Film Festival. Los Sobrevivientes was preserved by the Academy Film Archive, in conjunction with the Instituto Cubano de Arte e Industria Cinematográfica, in 2017.

== Plot ==
An aristocratic family decides to isolate themselves from the changes brought by the revolution and begin living History in reverse. A surreal voyage from Socialism to cannibalism.

== Cast ==
- Enrique Santiesteban - Sebastián Orozco
- Juanita Caldevilla - Doña Lola
- Germán Pinelli - Pascual Orozco
- Ana Viña - Fina Orozco
- Reynaldo Miravalles - Vicente Cuervo
- Vicente Revuelta - Julio Orozco
- Leonor Borrero - Cuca
- Carlos Ruiz de la Tejera - Manuel Orozco
- Yael Teruel - Finita Orozco - niña
- Lili Rentería - Finita Orozco (as Ana Lillian Renteria)
- Francisco Puentes - Julio Orozco - niño
- Patricio Wood - Julio Orozco
- Tony Cortes - Bartolomé Orozco - niño
- Jorge Alí - Bartolomé Orozco (as Jorge Félix Ali)
- Manolito Angueira - Sebastiancillo Orozco

== See also ==
- List of Cuban films
