= Stories of the Revolution =

1960 film

- Directed by: Tomás Gutiérrez Alea
- Written by: Tomás Gutiérrez Alea
- Starring: Bertina Acevedo
- Music by: Leo Brouwer
- Release date: 30 December 1960
- Running time: 81 minutes
- Country: Cuba
- Language: Spanish

Stories of the Revolution (Spanish: Historias de la revolución) is a 1960 Cuban drama film directed by Tomás Gutiérrez Alea. It was entered into the 2nd Moscow International Film Festival.

== Cast ==
- Bertina Acevedo
- Enrique Fong
- Miriam Gómez
- Francisco Lago
- Lilian Llerena
- Calixto Marrero
- Reynaldo Miravalles
- Blas Mora
- Eduardo Moure
- Tomás Rodríguez
- Encarnita Rojas
- Pascual Zamora

== See also ==
- List of Cuban films
