= Germán Pinelli =

Cuban journalist and actor

- Born: December 15, 1907; Havana, Cuba
- Died: November 19, 1996 (aged 88); Havana, Cuba

Germán Pinelli (born Germán Piniella Vázquez de Mella on December 15, 1907 – November 19, 1996) was a Cuban journalist and actor.

== Biography ==
Pinelli's voice was first heard on the radio waves when he was 14 years old, and a student at the prestigious Colegio de Belén for boys, run by the Jesuits. The Freemasons were raising funds for their orphanage, La Misericordia, by putting on a show at the Campoamor Theater, and they invited young Pinelli to sing.

Thirty years later, his face would be the first to appear on Cuban television screens. Pinelli studied piano and guitar and was a musician with the Orchestra Palau. He won a scholarship to study bel canto in Italy, but never received the funds, so he remained in Cuba and studied theater with his sister, Soledad. When he first approached Goar Mestre, the CEO of CMQ Radio and Television studios, for a job, he was told “he did not have the voice for radio.”

The turning point in young Pinelli's journalistic career came with his live coverage of the fight between two rival gangs on the corner of Orfila Street. There, lying on the floor, he reported the bloodbath. After that, his place in Cuban Journalism was secured. This incident began his long and illustrious career.

He became known for his wit and ability to hold an audience captive. During his lifetime, he received many honors both from the cultural community as well as from the government. He is buried in the Colon Cemetery, Havana, Cuba

He was married three times. His sister was the Cuban actress Sol Pinelli and his son is Tony Pinelli, the award winning Cuban composer, singer and musical scholar. Tony's sons are German David Pinelli (born September 24, 1973) and Ari A. Pinelli (born June 9, 1976), who along with German David's wife, Ana Paez (born January 9, 1966) are members of the Cuban musical group Los Tres de la Habana. He also had Alina Pinelli, the youngest of his children, from his marriage to Model and Socialite, Concepción Nanin. Alina at age 5 was part of the Children's Corps d'Ballet of Cuba's Ballet Nacional, under the direction of Alicia Alonso. She left Cuba with her mother in 1960. Although she has performed, she chose a career both in Law and in Teaching Art History. In 2007, she took vows and became a Pujari of the International Society for Krishna Consciousness (Hare Krishna.) Source: Alina Pinelli

== Filmography ==
Year	Title	Role	Notes
1978	Los sobrevivientes	Pascual Orozco	
1979	Portrait of Teresa		
1979	Maluala		
1981	Leyenda		
1985	Svindlande affärer	Konferencier	(final film role)
