= Esmael Barari =

Iranian film director

- اسماعیل براری
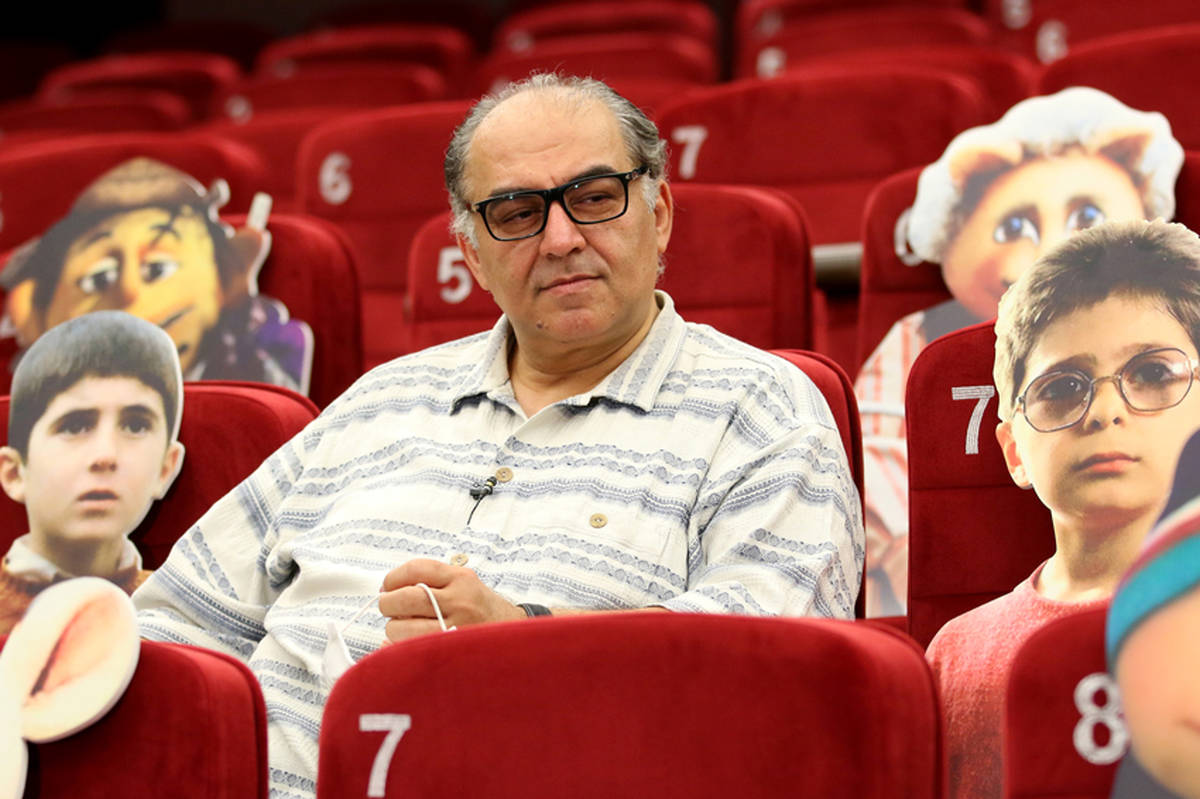
- Born: 26 October 1965 (age 60); Bandar Anzali, Iran
- Occupations: Film director; producer
- Years active: 1988–present

Esmael Barari (Persian: اسماعیل براری); (born 1965), is an Iranian filmmaker, film director, screenwriter, film editor and film producer. He is director of World Iranian Film Center, a member of The Union of Iranian Cinema Producers and a member of international jury of Mostra Valencia Film Festival.

== Film career ==
Esmael Barari graduated in filmmaking from Art University. In 1988, his short film, Reaction, won top prize at the first National Students Film Festival of Tehran and the silver plaque at the 1989 Ebensee Festival of Nations. His other short films are Nader's Gift (1989) and Loneliness And The Cold (1990) which was presented in FIPA Cannes-91 and received The Golden Butterfly for the Best Film at 5th International Festival of Film and Video for Children and Young Adults. Up to now he has made more than 20 feature, documentary and short films & TV series. His younger brother, Ahmad Barari, is a professor in Mechanical Engineering at the University of Ontario Institute of Technology (UOIT) in Canada.

== Cinematic style ==
Barari is part of a generation of filmmakers in the Modern Iranian Cinema, a Persian cinema movement that started in the 1980s and includes pioneering directors such as Mohsen Makhmalbaf, Amir Naderi, Abolfazl Jalili, Jafar Panahi, Bahman Ghobadi, Rakhshan Bani-E'temad and Majid Majidi. The filmmakers share many common techniques including the use of poetic dialogue and allegorical storytelling dealing with political and philosophical issues with documentary style narrative films. Barari's works are influenced by documentary filmmaker Morteza Avini and narrative film director Abbas Kiarostami, Who has a reputation for using child protagonists, for documentary style narrative films, for stories that take place in rural villages, and for conversations that unfold inside cars, using stationary mounted cameras. He is also known for his use of contemporary Iranian poetry in the dialogue, titles, and themes of his films. "Barari is the unvarnished offspring of Kiarostami and Hitchcock!"

== Filmography ==
=== Feature films ===
Year	English title	Original title	Notes
1991	City in the Hands of Children	شهر در دست بچه‌ها	
1992	The Nest	آشیانه	Banned
1996	The Green Hell	جهنم سبز	
2000	Devil's Dance	رقص شیطان	
2004	Dead Heat Under the Shrubs	کویر مرگ	Banned
2007	Day of Rain	روز باران	TV Movie
2005/2011	Maryam's Report	گزارش مریم	
2011	Twelve Chairs	دوازده صندلی	Based on The Twelve Chairs

=== Short Film ===
Year	English title	Original title	Notes
1988	Reaction	عکس‌العمل	
1990	Loneliness and the Clod	تنهایی و کلوخ	

== Festivals and Awards ==
=== 1988 ===
- Reaction (short film)

- 1st National Students Film Festival, Tehran; won the top prize

- Fajr Film Festival, Tehran

=== 1989 ===
- Reaction (short film)

- Ebensee Festival of Nations, Austria; won the silver plaque

=== 1991 ===
- Loneliness and the Clod (short film)

- 5th International Festival of Film and Video for Children and Young Adults, Tehran; Won The Golden Butterfly for the Best Film

- FIPA Cannes-91, France

- City in the Hands of Children

- Fajr Film Festival, Tehran

=== 1992 ===
- City in the Hands of Children

- 6th International Festival of Film and Video for Children and Young Adults, Iran-Isfahan

- The Nest

- Fajr Film Festival, Tehran

=== 1996 ===
- The Green Hell

- Fajr Film Festival

=== 2000 ===
- The Devil's Dance

- Fajr Film Festival

=== 2004 ===
- Dead Heat under the Shrubs

- 7th Brooklyn Int'l Film Festival, USA-New York

- Cinema Paradise Film Festival, USA-Hawaii

- 12th Raindance Film Festival, UK

- 6th Panorama, Greece-Thessaloniki

- 49th Valladolid Int'l Film Festival, Spain; Winner of Audience Award Best Film

- 7th Rehoboth Beach Independent film Festival, USA-Delaware

- 1st annual Turks & Caicos, USA

- 4th Anchorage Film Festival, USA-Alaska

- 4th Tiburon International Film Festival, USA

=== 2005 ===
- Dead Heat under the Shrubs

- Festival del Cine Pobre, Cuba-Gibara

- Indianapolis International Film Festival, USA

=== 2006 ===
- Dead Heat under the Shrubs

- Int'l Fest. of Muslim Cinema"Golden Minbar", Russia-Kazan

=== 2007 ===
- Dead Heat under the Shrubs

- 9th Mumbai International Film Festival, India

- Day of Rain

- Roosta Film Festival, Tehran; Won the Golden Plaque for the Best Film

- 21st International Children Film Festival, Hamedan; Mentioned for Religious Content

- 1st Quran Film Festival, Tehran; Won the Khademin Quran Medal

- 25th International environmental film festival, Paris

- The 37th Roshd International Film Festival, Tehran/Nov.2007
