= The Twelve Chairs (1962 film) =

1962 film

- Directed by: Tomás Gutiérrez Alea
- Written by: Tomás Gutiérrez Alea
- Produced by: Margarita Alexandre
- Starring: Enrique Santiesteban
- Cinematography: Ramón F. Suárez
- Music by: Juan Blanco
- Release date: 17 December 1962
- Running time: 94 minutes
- Country: Cuba
- Language: Spanish

The Twelve Chairs (Spanish: Las doce sillas) is a 1962 Cuban comedy film directed by Tomás Gutiérrez Alea. The plot is based on Ilf and Petrov's 1928 novel of the same name. It was entered into the 3rd Moscow International Film Festival.

== Cast ==
- Enrique Santiesteban as Hipólito Garrigó
- Reynaldo Miravalles as Oscar (as Reinaldo Miravalles)
- René Sánchez as El Cura
- Pilín Vallejo as Gertrudis
- Idalberto Delgado as Ernesto
- Ana Viña (as Ana Viñas)
- Manuel Pereiro
- Pedro Martín Planas
- Raúl Xiqués
- Gilda Hernández
- Silvia Planas

== See also ==
- List of Cuban films
