= Evelyn Stevens (wrestler) =

American professional wrestler

Personal information
- Born: Evelyn Jardine Riegle; 1943 (age 82–83) Tampa, Florida, U.S.
- Spouses: The Spoiler; Frank Riegle

Professional wrestling career
- Ring name: Evelyn Stevens
- Billed height: 5 ft 4 in (163 cm)
- Billed weight: 100 lb (45 kg)
- Debut: 1961
- Retired: 1984

Evelyn Jardine Riegle is an American retired professional wrestler, better known by her ring name Evelyn Stevens.

== Early life ==
Riegle was born in Tampa, Florida and raised in Nashville, Tennessee.

== Professional wrestling career ==
Riegle debuted in 1961, using the ring name "Evelyn Stevens". She worked as a heel in the Great Plains, Midwest, and Missouri regions before moving to Texas.

In 1969, Riegle wrestled in Australia with World Championship Wrestling.

From the late-1960s to the late-1980s she held the NWA Texas Women's Championship on five occasions. On October 8, 1978, she held the National Wrestling Alliance World Women's Championship for two days, defeating the Fabulous Moolah in a bout in Dallas booked by Gary Hart. In mid-1982, she wrestled a handful of matches for Jim Crockett Promotions in the Carolinas.

Riegle retired from professional wrestling in 1984.

== Personal life ==
At one point in time, Riegle was in a relationship with fellow professional wrestler Edward "Wahoo" McDaniel. At another point in time, Riegle was married to Donald Jardine who wrestled as "The Spoiler". Sometime after the couple divorced, she married again, this time to bodybuilder and gym owner Frank Riegle. In December 1986, she was arrested for shooting Riegle three times in the face and chest in their home in San Antonio, killing him. She was convicted of murder and given a 20-year sentence, but was pardoned after five years.

== Championships and accomplishments ==
- National Wrestling Alliance
  - NWA Texas Women's Championship (5 times)
  - NWA World Women's Championship (1 time)
