= Evelyn Paniagua Stevens =

American political scientist

- Born: 1919; Chicago
- Died: March 19, 1996 (aged 76–77); Alameda, California
- Education: University of California, Berkeley
- Known for: Introducing the idea of marianismo
- Scientific career
- Fields: Latin American studies
- Workplaces: University of Akron; Loyola University Chicago; University of California, Berkeley

Evelyn Paniagua Stevens (1919 – March 19, 1996) was an American scholar of Latin American studies. She spent much of her career at the Latin American Studies Center in the University of California, Berkeley, where she was a scholar of Latin American politics and women's studies. Stevens may have been the first to introduce the concept of marianismo to the academic literature, when she controversially argued in 1973 that marianismo was a widespread counterbalance to machismo. Stevens was the 10th President of the Latin American Studies Association, and the first woman to be president of that organization.

== Life and career ==
Stevens was born in Chicago in 1919. She attended Northwestern University and the University of Puerto Rico, but did not complete a degree at either school. She married Manuel Paniagua, from whom she would later become divorced, and they had two children. Stevens spent the 1940s and 1950s working primarily as a journalist and civil servant in a variety of institutions. Her workplaces during this time included the United States Army Corps of Engineers, the National Labor Relations Board, the Office of the Governor of Puerto Rico, and The San Juan Star. In the late 1950s, Stevens matriculated at the University of California, Berkeley, where she obtained an A.B. degree, an A.M. degree, and a PhD. Her PhD dissertation, defended on March 31, 1969, was entitled Information and decision-making in Mexico.

After obtaining her PhD, Stevens held faculty appointments at the University of Akron and then Loyola University Chicago, before joining the Latin American Studies Center at the University of California, Berkeley. She also married the Case Western Reserve University Professor George Sayers. In the 1976–1977 academic year, Stevens was the President of the Latin American Studies Association, which is the largest Latin American studies association. She was the first woman to be president of this organization.

Steven's work in Latin American studies was particularly concerned with women's issues. She also published case studies of particular regional or historical events; for example, in 1963 she published the book Puerto Rico's "Peaceful Revolution", and in 1974 she published Protest and Response in Mexico. Stevens has been credited with introducing the idea of marianismo to the academic literature (re-defining a pre-existing word that had referred the exaltation of the Mary, mother of Jesus) in her 1973 work, Marianismo: The Other Face of Machismo, though it has been argued that others described the idea of marianismo earlier. Defining marianismo as "the cult of female spiritual superiority which teaches that women are semi-divine, morally superior to and spiritually stronger than men", Stevens argued that marianismo was a widespread phenomenon across Latin America which counterbalanced the cultural idea of machismo. The concept proved to be highly influential over the following decades, but it attracted substantial controversy as scholars debated whether it really existed across Latin America as Stevens argued, or whether marianismo was an idea that had been inaccurately read into Latin American cultures by a North American researcher. Although the claim that marianismo exists and is widespread across Latin America came under sustained critique in the following decades, the idea proved influential and has continued to be commonly used in cultural analyses.

Stevens died on March 19, 1996, in Alameda, California.

== Selected works ==
- Puerto Rico's "peaceful Revolution" (1963)
- "Marianismo: The Other Face of Machismo" (1973)
- Protest and Response in Mexico (1974)
