= Zafra (agriculture) =

Late summer or early autumn harvest

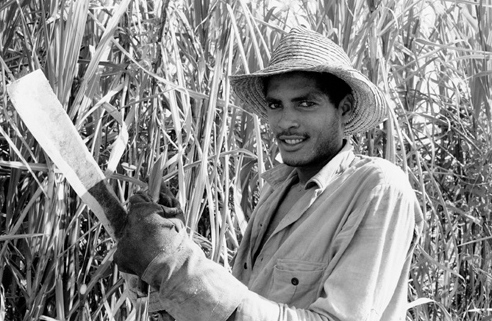
A sugar cane cutter in Cuba during zafra

The zafra is the late summer or early autumn harvest; the term is common in countries with Arabic or Spanish influence.

In the Caribbean, the term generally refers to the sugar cane harvest. There, the zafra runs from January through May, whereas in the Mediterranean it occurs in September to October. In each case, however, the zafra was closely tied to the life cycle of sugar cane. Because in the Caribbean sugar cane is ready for harvest at a time of year different from in Spain or North Africa, the meaning of the term has shifted.

The term became well known internationally during the 1960s due to its importance in Cuba. Many leftists visited Cuba during the zafra season to help harvest sugar cane, Cuba's principal crop. The Cuban government for several decades made the La Gran Zafra 'The Great Zafra' a centerpiece of both its economic policy and its international relations campaign. Each year, the government urged everyone to help make the zafra the biggest ever. Schools were often closed, and urban residents frequently relocated to the countryside to assist with the harvest. In particular, the goal of reaching the Ten Million Ton Zafra was as much a commonplace of Cuban propaganda as were the apologies and explanations for why the goal was not reached (Pollitt). The national mobilization of the 1970 zafra and its immediate aftermath is the major historical context for the autobiography Dancing with Cuba: A Memoir of the Revolution (2004) by New York Review of Books journalist Alma Guillermoprieto (translated into English by Esther Allen).

== Etymology ==
Linguists agree that the term zafra entered Spanish from Arabic, but there is some disagreement about the precise origins of the term. Some believe it comes from zāfar or zafariya 'harvest time', while others believe the term derives from saʼifah 'gathering time'. In Spain, the term referred to harvests that took place in September and October and was especially often used to describe the harvest of sugar cane, a crop whose production was brought from Arab lands.
