= Tomás Gutiérrez Alea =

Cuban film director and screenwriter

- Born: 11 December 1928; Havana, Cuba
- Died: 16 April 1996 (aged 67); Havana, Cuba
- Education: University of Havana, Havana, Cuba; Centro Sperimentale di Cinematografia, Rome, Italy
- Occupations: Film director, screenwriter
- Years active: 1947–1996
- Notable work: Memorias del Subdesarrollo
- Movement: Third Cinema
- Spouse: Mirta Ibarra

Tomás Gutiérrez Alea (Spanish pronunciation: [aˈlea]; December 11, 1928 – April 16, 1996) was a Cuban film director and screenwriter. Gutiérrez Alea wrote and directed more than twenty features, documentaries, and short films, which are known for his sharp insight into post-Revolutionary Cuba, and possess a delicate balance between dedication to the revolution and criticism of the social, economic, and political conditions of the country.

Gutiérrez's work is representative of a cinematic movement occurring in the 1960s and 1970s known collectively as the New Latin American Cinema. This collective movement, also referred to by various writers by specific names such as "Third Cinema", "Cine Libre", and "Imperfect Cinema," was concerned largely with the problems of neocolonialism and cultural identity. The movement rejected both the commercial perfection of the Hollywood style, and the auteur-oriented European art cinema, for a cinema created as a tool for political and social change. Due in no small part to the filmmakers’ lack of resources, aesthetic was of secondary importance to cinema's social function. The movement's main goal was to create films in which the viewer became an active, self-aware participant in the discourse of the film. Viewers were presented with an analysis of a current problem within society that as of that time had no clear solution, hoping to make the audience aware of the problem and to leave the theater willing to become actors of social change.

== Early life ==
Born in Havana on December 11, 1928, Gutiérrez was raised in an affluent, politically progressive family. After receiving his law degree from the University of Havana in 1951, Gutiérrez studied cinema at the Centro Sperimentale di Cinematografia in Rome, graduating in 1953. He was heavily influenced by Italian Neorealism, and created his first films in Rome with future Cuban colleague Julio García Espinosa, with whom he co-directed the documentary film El Mégano (The Charcoal Worker).

Shortly after the success of the Cuban Revolution led by Fidel Castro in 1959, Gutiérrez, Espinosa, and several other young filmmakers founded the Instituto Cubano del Arte e Industria Cinematográficos (ICAIC). As ardent supporters of the Revolution, ICAIC was a filmmaker's collective which believed film to be the most important modern art form and the best medium to distribute revolutionary thought to the masses. Gutiérrez's Esta Tierra Nuestra (This Land Of Ours), was the first documentary made after the revolutionary victory. ICAIC focused mostly on documentaries and newsreels in its formative years, but eventually expanded into production of feature films, including Gutiérrez's early Historias de la Revolución (Stories Of The Revolution) (1960), ICAIC's first fiction film, and Doce sillas (The Twelve Chairs), (1962). Stories of the Revolution was entered into the 2nd Moscow International Film Festival and The Twelve Chairs was entered into the 3rd Moscow International Film Festival.

== Most popular works ==
Gutiérrez's first widely successful feature, Muerte de un burócrata (Death of a Bureaucrat) (1966) introduces itself as a sort of homage to the history of cinematic comedy, and includes direct allusions to the work of Buster Keaton, Laurel & Hardy, Luis Buñuel, and many others. The story follows a young man's confounding plight through bureaucratic offices to have his dead uncle exhumed and then reburied after the body is buried with his identification card.

His next film, Memorias del Subdesarrollo (Memories of Underdevelopment) (1968) was the first Cuban film to be shown in the United States since the Revolution. Based on Edmundo Desnoes’s novella "Inconsolable Memories," the film is the memoir of a morally ambiguous bourgeois intellectual living in Havana in the period between the Bay of Pigs Invasion and the Cuban Missile Crisis. The protagonist is unwilling to take a political stance one way or another, yet continues to despise the country around him for being backwards and underdeveloped. His life eventually fades into nothingness, becoming a personality which has no use in this new Cuba.

In a self-reflexive cameo appearance, Gutiérrez calls the film a "collage...with a little bit of everything". Gutiérrez uses a dizzying array of materials and filmic styles in Memories, from documentary-style narrative sequences which use long unbroken shots taken from handheld cameras to agitational montage sequences reminiscent of the films of early Soviet filmmakers such as Sergei Eisenstein. Memories makes use of various types of media including direct documentary footage shot, still photos, archive and newsreel footage, clips of Hollywood films, and recorded speeches by Fidel Castro and John F. Kennedy, to create a seemingly disarticulated film language that is in direct contrast to the straightforward Hollywood style.

Although criticism of the Revolution and Cuban society was at the heart of not only Memories, but all of Gutiérrez's works, Gutiérrez continued to be a dedicated supporter of Cuban Socialism. But his works could hardly be described as propaganda either. Gutiérrez described the motivation for his contradictory approach by saying: "...cinema provides an active and mobilizing element, which stimulates participation in the revolutionary process. Then, it is not sufficient to have a moralizing cinema based on harangue and exhortation. We need a cinema that promotes and develops a critical attitude. But how to criticize and at the same time strengthen the reality in which we are immersed?"

Commenting on his style, Gutiérrez called himself "a man who makes criticism inside the revolution, who wants to ameliorate the process, to perfect it, but not to destroy it".

== Late career and legacy ==
In the following decades, Gutiérrez divided his time between making his own films and mentoring promising young filmmakers through ICAIC.

In 1972 and 1976, respectively, Gutiérrez completed two historical feature films, Una pelea cubana contra los demonios (A Cuban Fight Against the Demons) and La última cena (The Last Supper). Both set in Spanish colonial Cuba, the films study contradictions and hypocrisy in Cuba's past of imperialism, religion, and slavery.

Hasta cierto punto (Up to a Certain Point) (starring Gutiérrez's wife, Mirta Ibarra.) The film underwent some censorship and remains to this day considered by Cuban critics one of his lesser works, though it is still highly regarded. The director himself said jokingly that the film was only successful "up to a certain point"

In the early 1990s, Gutiérrez fell into ill health, forcing him to co-direct his last two films with his friend Juan Carlos Tabío. The first, Fresa y Chocolate (Strawberry and Chocolate) (1993) became the first Cuban film to be nominated for the Academy Award for Best Foreign Film. The film's story centers on the oft conflictory relationship between a committed Marxist student and a flamboyantly gay artist. Gutiérrez's final film, Guantanamera, (1994) uses traditional elements such as an ensemble cast and romantic comedy to take a more subtle approach to Gutiérrez's old targets: underdevelopment and bureaucracy. The film won the Silver Bear - Special Jury Prize at the 44th Berlin International Film Festival.

Titón, as he was known to his friends, died in Havana on April 16, 1996, at age 67. He is buried in the Colon Cemetery, Havana.

Three of Gutiérrez's films—Death of a Bureaucrat, Una Pelea Cubana contra los Demonios, and Los Sobrevivientes—were preserved by the Academy Film Archive in 2017 and 2019.

== Filmography ==
- La caperucita roja (1947) - short film
- El faquir (1947) - short film
- Una confusión cotidiana (1950) - short film, co-directed with Nestor Almendros and based upon "A Common Confusion" by Franz Kafka
- Il sogno de Giovanni Bassain (1953) - short film, co-directed with Filippo Perrone
- El mégano (1955) - short documentary film, co-directed with Julio García Espinosa and made in collaboration with Alfredo Guevara and José Massip
- La toma de La Habana por los ingleses (1958) - short documentary film
- Esta tierra nuestra (1959) - short documentary film, co-directed with Julio García Espinosa
- Stories of the Revolution (Historias de la revolución) (1960) - fiction, 81 minutes
- General Assembly (Asamblea general) (1960) - short documentary film
- Death to the Invader (Muerte al invasor) (1961) - short documentary film, co-directed with Santiago Álvarez
- The Twelve Chairs (Las doce sillas) (1962) - fiction, 97 minutes
- Cumbite (1964) - fiction, 82 minutes
- Death of a Bureaucrat (Muerte de un burócrata) (1966) - fiction, 85 minutes
- Memories of Underdevelopment (Memorias del subdesarrollo) (1968) - fiction, 97 minutes
- A Cuban Fight Against Demons (Una pelea cubana contra los demonios) (1971) - fiction, 130 minutes
- El arte del tabaco (1974) - short documentary film
- El camino de la mirra y el incienso (1975) - short documentary film, co-directed with Constante Diego
- The Last Supper (La última cena) (1976) - fiction, 120 minutes
- La sexta parte del mundo (1977) - documentary film, co-directed with Julio García Espinosa
- The Survivors (Los sobrevivientes) (1979) - fiction, 130 minutes
- Up to a Certain Point (Hasta cierto punto) (1983) - fiction, 88 minutes
- Letters from the Park (Cartas del parque) (1989) - fiction, 88 minutes
- Far Apart (Contigo en la distancia) (1991) - segment of the anthology film Con el amor no se juega
- Strawberry and Chocolate (1993) - codirected with Juan Carlos Tabío, fiction, 110 minutes
- Guantanamera (1995) - codirected with Juan Carlos Tabío, fiction, 101 minutes

== See also ==
- Cinema of Cuba

== Bibliography ==
- Alcázar Garrido, del, Joan; López Rivero, Sergio: De compañero a contrarrevolucionario. La Revolución cubana y el cine de Tomás Gutiérrez Alea. Publicacions de la Universitat de València, 2009.
- Burton, Julianne: Cinema and social change in Latin America: Conversations with filmmakers. Austin: (University of Texas Press), 1986
- Chanan, Michael: The Cuban Image. London, 1983
- Evora, José Antonio: Tomás Gutiérrez Alea. 22. Festival de Cine de Huesca. Instituto de Cooperación Iberoamericana, Huesca 1994
- Gutiérrez Alea, Tomás; Desnoes, Edmundo: Memories of Underdevelopment. The Revolutionary Films of Cuba. Myerson, Michael (Ed.), New York 1973
- Gutiérrez Alea, Tomás: Dialéctica del espectador (Ediciones Unión), Habana 1982
- Hennebelle, Guy; Gumucio-Dagron, Alfonso (Ed.): Les Cinémas d’Amerique Latine. Paris, 1981
- Jahnke, Eckart; Lichtenstein, Manfred: Kubanischer Dokumentarfilm. State Film archives of the GDR (Ed.), Berlín 1974
- Oroz, Silvia: Tomás Gutiérrez Alea: Os filmes que não filmei. (Anima Produçoes Artísticas e Culturais), Río de Janeiro 1985
- Paranagua, Paulo Antonio: Le Cinema Cubain. Georges Pompidou Center (Ed.), Paris 1990
- Toledo, Teresa: 10 Años del Nuevo Cine Latinoamericano. Cinemateca de Cuba, Verdoux Fifth Centenary (Ed.), Madrid, Havana 1990
