= Pedro Padilla Flores =

Mexican serial killer

- Born: Ramiro Adame López; 1970s
- Other names: The Rio Bravo Assassin; Many other aliases
- Conviction: Murder
- Penalty: Life imprisonment

Details
- Victims: 4–30
- Span of crimes: 1986–1998
- Country: Mexico
- State: Ciudad Juárez

Pedro Padilla Flores (born in the 1970s), also known as The Rio Bravo Assassin among many other aliases, is a Mexican serial killer who was convicted of killing three women in Ciudad Juárez but is suspected of murdering up to 27 more, some of whom were underage. He was captured and sentenced to prison time for three murders in 1986, but he escaped in 1990 and, after remaining a fugitive from justice, was recaptured in New Mexico and deported back to Ciudad Juárez. On January 24, 2014, ICE agents delivered Padilla to agents from the Mexican Ministerial Police. Currently, he is one of the main suspects in the unsolved femicides in Ciudad Juárez. He was a disorganized, sedentary, hedonistic murderer motivated by sexual compulsion and predatory behaviour.

== Background ==
Padilla lived in the Mariscal district of downtown Juárez as a regular drug addict.

== Crimes ==
In 1986, the bodies of young women began to appear on the banks of the Rio Grande, representing one of the first femicides reported in Ciudad Juárez. The women, some of them underage, showed signs of sexual abuse and were killed by strangulation.

Padilla's modus operandi was to follow his victims to deserted places where he subdued and raped them, choking them with his bare hands, supposedly this was done to make the vagina contract during the violation.

Quite possibly, Padilla committed the crimes under the influence of drugs. According to Joel Norris, drug use is frequent during the first behavioural phase of a serial killer, in which they distance themselves from reality.

== Apprehension, condemnation and escape ==
Padilla was captured in 1986, by the Second Commander of the Judicial Police of the state of Chihuahua, Felipe Pando. Padilla confessed to 30 murders but only 3 could be proven: two of women and one of a 13-year-old girl.

He was sentenced to life imprisonment but had been held for only 4 years in the Social Rehabilitation Center of Ciudad Juárez when he escaped in 1990. Many considered his escape one of largest cases of police negligence and incompetence in Mexico. Padilla was rearrested in the US by ICE agents and handed over to the Mexican authorities on January 24, 2014.

== New crimes ==
In 1992, the murders of women in Juárez began again. For Felipe Pando, Padillo remains the main suspect:

"Padilla was a serial killer. They should walk after him as one of the main suspects..." (Pando, Felipe; 1992)

Although Pando has one of the worst reputations within the border police, with several complaints of torture and forced confessions, it is undeniable that many of the recent crimes against women in Juárez correspond to the pattern and modus operandi of Padilla.

=== The murder of Hester S. van Nierop ===
On September 20, 1998, the body of Dutch citizen Hester Suzanne van Nierop was found under the bed of a hotel room in the red zone of Ciudad Juárez; she had been raped and strangled, had multiple mutilations that correspond to defeminization pattern and also had incisions on her neck.

Hester had arrived at the hotel on September 19, 1998, in the company of a man. The person who had rented the room had signed in as "Roberto Flores".

=== Portrayal ===
Van Nierop's partner was described to the police as:

"...athletic build, about 30 to 35 years old, light complexion, dark hair, light-coloured eyes, straight nose, 1.76 meters high, acne on the face and a small scar on the right cheek..." (Anonymous; 1998)

The description matched to that of Padilla, and the murderer had signed in with his second name, but the modus operandi did not match, as this time it was an organized killer, apparently evolving. Hester was not the first and not last to die this way, and Padilla became the main suspect in her death and the deaths of others.

=== Investigation and detention ===
The Attorney General of the State of Chihuahua implemented a series of intelligence and covert operations, after resuming the matter, since 2004 an arrest was issued.

The probable culprit was a moderately-known person in central Juárez, a subject that attracted attention with his special characteristics: deformed handset, athletic build and striking tattoos that showed a naked woman.

Padilla was placed in a USA jail; however, an extensive search was made, as he used up to seven different aliases.

Agents of the Cyber Police and the Intelligence Agency made contact with the murderer on Facebook, where an agent passed himself off as a woman, kept constant communication and in a span of seven months managed to gain his trust, which was reflected when he confessed to the committing the murder of the Dutch citizen.

In December 2013, investigating agents of the Intelligence Agency and the Office of the Attorney General of Chihuahua obtained specific data on Padilla's location: he was in Adams County, Mississippi in a Federal Bureau of Prisoners, where he had been detained for drug trafficking.

In cooperation with the FBI and ICE, the detention of Padilla in one of the latter's prisons was confirmed, and international efforts began to have him returned to Ciudad Juárez and tried for van Nierop's murder. On January 15, 2014, Padilla was deported to Juárez, where he was served with the arrest warrant for the murder of van Nierop, and placed in custody.

=== Sentence ===
Once in national territory, proceedings against Padilla began. The General Prosecutor presented a solid and reliable investigation, supported by technical tests, scientific studies, forensic analysis, documentaries, as well as expert opinion. On December 1, 2015, Padilla was convicted of murder in the homicide of Hester van Nierop.

The Public Ministry had testimony from a total of seven witnesses who saw him with van Nierop at the crime scene. A receptionist who was present said: "I wrote down his name with my own hand and have the record book from the time." In addition, forensic evidence including footprint impression was presented.

Finally, after a 17-year struggle, justice was done for the victim's family. "A Cry for Help from Juárez" by Mrs. Arséne van Nierop details the family's journey to justice and the creation of the Hester Foundation in 2005. The Foundation supports the work of the Casa Amiga crisis center, which offers legal, educational, emotional, and social help to Mexican women in addition to providing violence prevention education.

=== A matter of international relevance ===
The issue generated a strong reaction from the Dutch government which made an international diplomatic claim. No progress had been made in solving the crime, the alleged perpetrator was still at large, and there was strong pressure due to the intervention of the United States Organization and the Inter-American Commission of Human Rights.

On the day of the sentencing, Attorney General of Chihuahua, Jorge Enrique González Nicolás, contacted the Dutch ambassador in Mexico, who, during the entire process, was on the watch and in touch with the agency. He also linked with the victim's mother and the federal authorities to inform them of the conclusion of the criminal process.

Once the murderer was arrested, diplomatic authorities from the Netherlands expressed gratitude to the Mexican State as this was a matter of international importance and interest. With the condemnatory sentence of 35 years in prison and reparation of damage, Mexico has fully complied with the petition before the Inter-American Commission of Human Rights to do justice for van Nierop.

== See also ==
- Abdel Latif Sharif
- Alejandro Máynez
- Ángel Maturino Reséndiz
- Daniel Audiel López Martínez
- List of serial killers by country
- List of serial killers by number of victims
