= International Day for the Elimination of Violence Against Women =

United Nations-designated observance day

International Day for the Elimination of Violence against Women
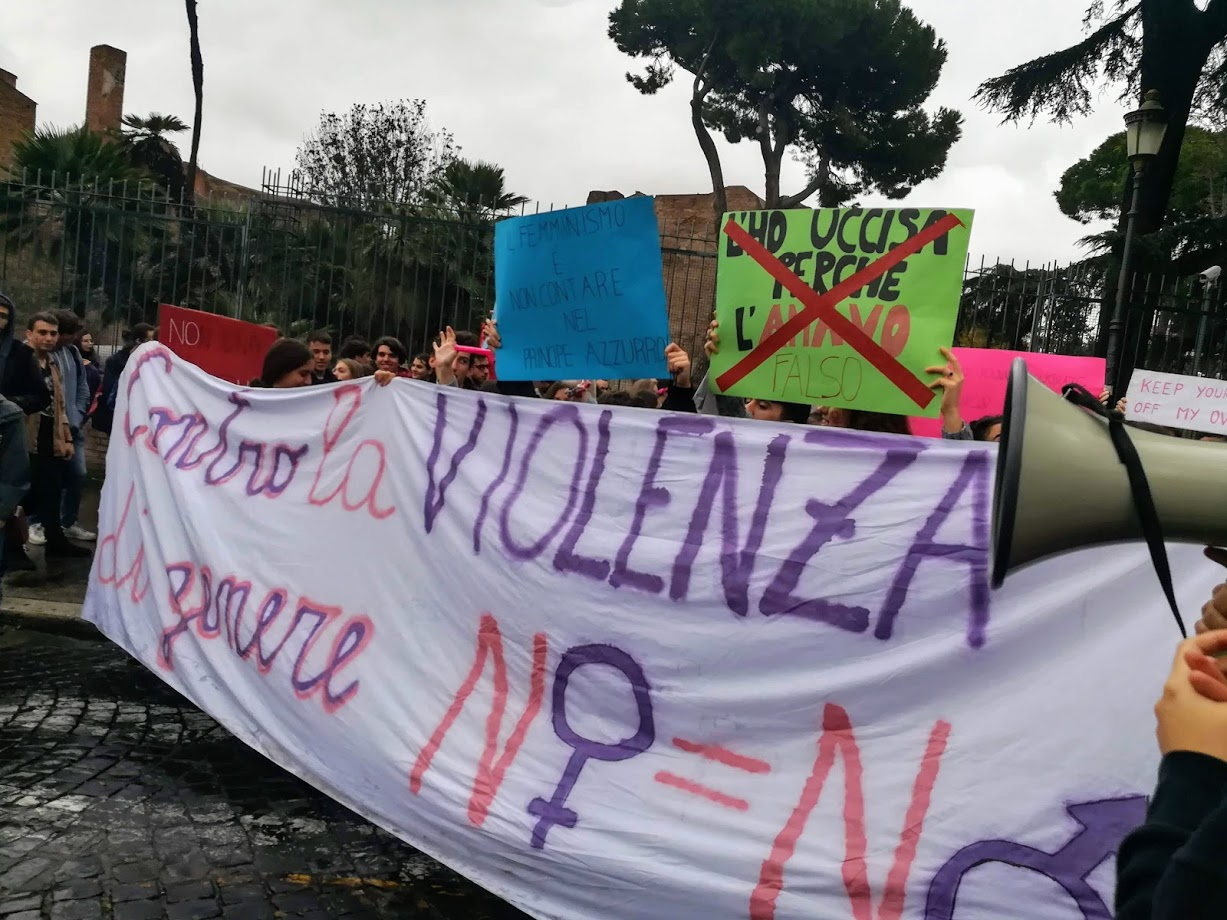
- 2018 in Rome
- Significance: Awareness of violence against Women
- Date: 25 November
- Next time: 25 November 2026
- Frequency: Annual
- Related to: The 1960 murders of the Mirabal sisters

The United Nations General Assembly has designated November 25 as the International Day for the Elimination of Violence Against Women (Resolution 54/134). The premise of the day is to raise awareness around the world that women are subjected to rape, domestic violence and other forms of violence; furthermore, one of the aims of the day is to highlight that the scale and true nature of the issue is often hidden.

For 2014, the official theme framed by the UN Secretary-General's campaign UNiTE to End Violence against Women, was Orange your Neighbourhood. For 2018, the official theme was "Orange the World:#HearMeToo", for 2019 it was "Orange the World: Generation Equality Stands Against Rape", for 2020 it was "Orange the World: Fund, Respond, Prevent, Collect!", for 2021 it was "Orange the World: End Violence against Women Now!", for 2022 the theme was "UNiTE! Activism to end violence against women and girls", for 2023 it was "UNiTE! Invest to Prevent Violence Against Women & Girls! #No Excuse", for 2024 it was "Every 10 minutes, a woman is killed. #NoExcuse UNiTE to End Violence against Women" and for 2025 it was "Digital violence is real violence. There is #NoExcuse for online abuse".

The day got an additional designation in 2011 as the Roses Revolution Day by the namesake movement against obstetric violence, supported by the German National Committee of UN Women.

== History ==
Historically, the date is based on the date of the 1960 assassination of the three Mirabal sisters, political activists in the Dominican Republic; the killings were ordered by Dominican dictator Rafael Trujillo (1930–1961). In 1981, activists at the Latin American and Caribbean Feminist Encuentros marked November 25 as a day to combat and raise awareness of violence against women more broadly; on February 7, 2000, the date received its official United Nations (UN) resolution.

The UN and the Inter-Parliamentary Union have encouraged governments, international organizations and NGOs to organize activities to support the day as an international observance. For example, UN Women (the United Nations Entity for Gender Equality and the Empowerment of Women) observes the day each year and offers suggestions for other organizations to observe it.

In his message on the day in 2013, UN Secretary-General Ban Ki-moon stated:

I welcome the chorus of voices calling for an end to the violence that affects an estimated one in three women in her lifetime. I applaud leaders who are helping to enact and enforce laws and change mindsets. And I pay tribute to all those heroes around the world who help victims to heal and to become agents of change.

For 2014, the focus was on how violence cuts across all 12 of the critical areas of concern of the Beijing Declaration and Platform for Action, which turned 20 in 2015.

In her message for 25 November 2014, UN Women Executive Director Phumzile Mlambo-Ngcuka said:

In 1995, close to 20 years ago, 189 governments came together in Beijing. They adopted a Platform for Action that spelled out key strategies to end violence against women, empower women, and achieve gender equality. ... The promises from 20 years ago are still valid today. Together we must make 2015 the year that marks the beginning of the end of gender inequality. Now is the time for action.

The actress Melania Dalla Costa is testimonial for the 2019 United Nations (UNICRI) campaign "I am no longer myself" against violence towards women, to be held on the November 25th International Day for the elimination of violence against women. The campaign was handled by photographer Dimitri Dimitracacos.

== Recognition in different countries ==
=== Australia ===
In Australia, a campaign has formed around International Day for the Elimination of Violence against Women.

== Italy ==
In 2022 the Alstom Italy, became the first company to recreate the Red Shoes artwork. Elina Chauvet's 2009 art work based on dozens of abandoned red women's shoes has been recreated dozens of times in different countries. In 2022 the Altrom recreated the installation at the company's six plants in Italy using red shoes donated by employees. The event was curated by Monica Pirone to start on the 21 November and continue to 25 November. Elina Chauvet was a key guest.

=== Philippines ===
Since 2002, the Philippine government has been actively participating in the global activism against gender-based violence from November 25 to December 10 of each year. In 2006, through a presidential proclamation, the Philippine campaign was extended to until December 12, which is known as the Anti-Trafficking in Persons Day. The country's commitment to the observance was strengthened when a law was made declaring November 25 of every year as the "National Consciousness Day for the Elimination of Violence Against Women and Children".

== Marches ==
=== 2017 ===
Marches attracted hundreds of participants in Bogota, Paris, and Rome. Thousands marched in San José, Costa Rica and Lima. Over 1,000 Turkish protesters turned out for a banned march in Istanbul; police cut off the end of the march and dispersed the marchers peacefully.

=== 2018 ===
According to the organizers, around 150 thousand participants in Rome for the third Non Una Di Meno (Italian chapter of Ni Una Menos association) marched for the International Day for the Elimination of Violence against Women and against Pillon decree, which took place from Piazza della Repubblica to Piazza San Giovanni. Among the participants was the former president of the Chamber of Deputies, Laura Boldrini.

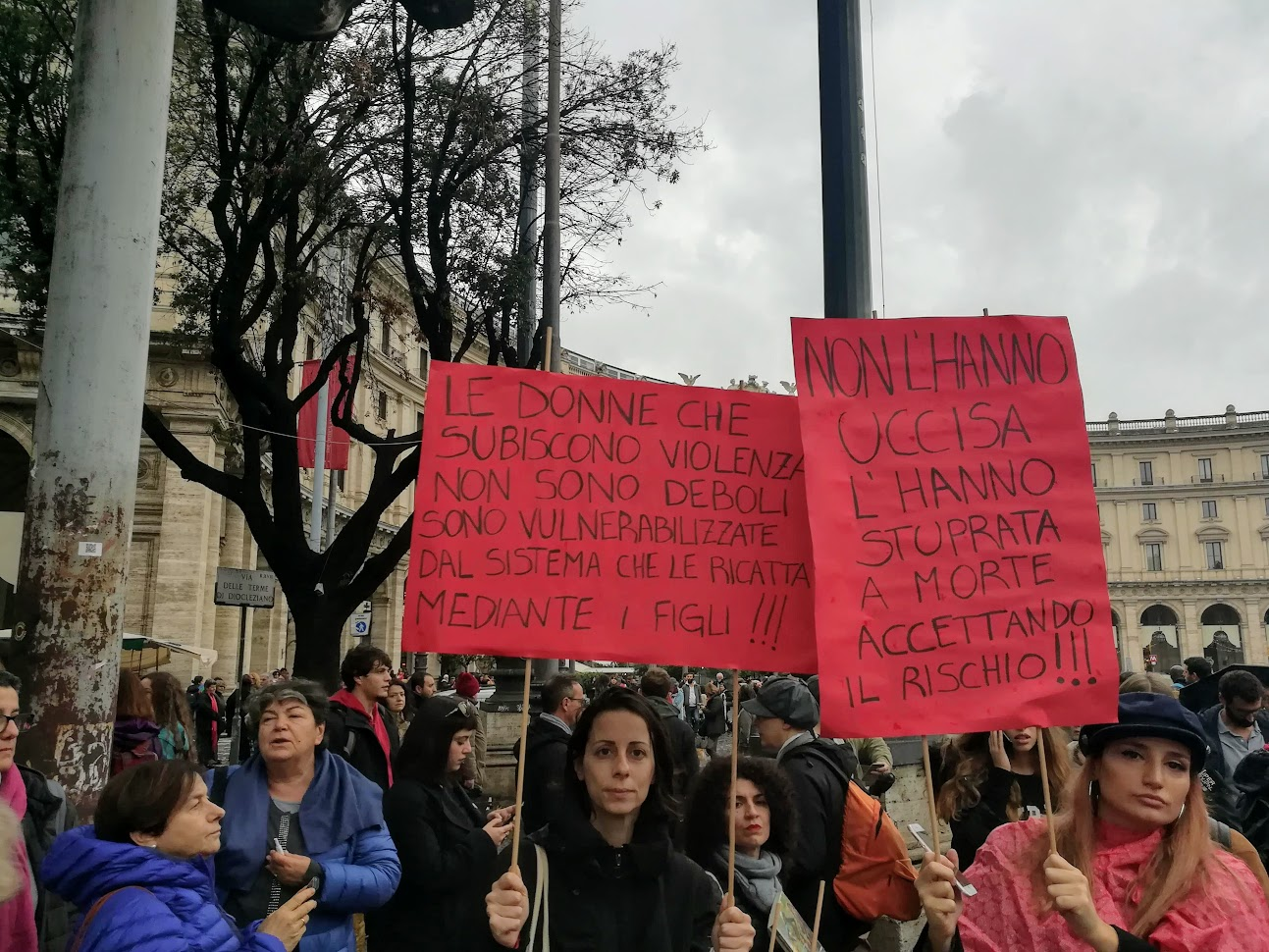

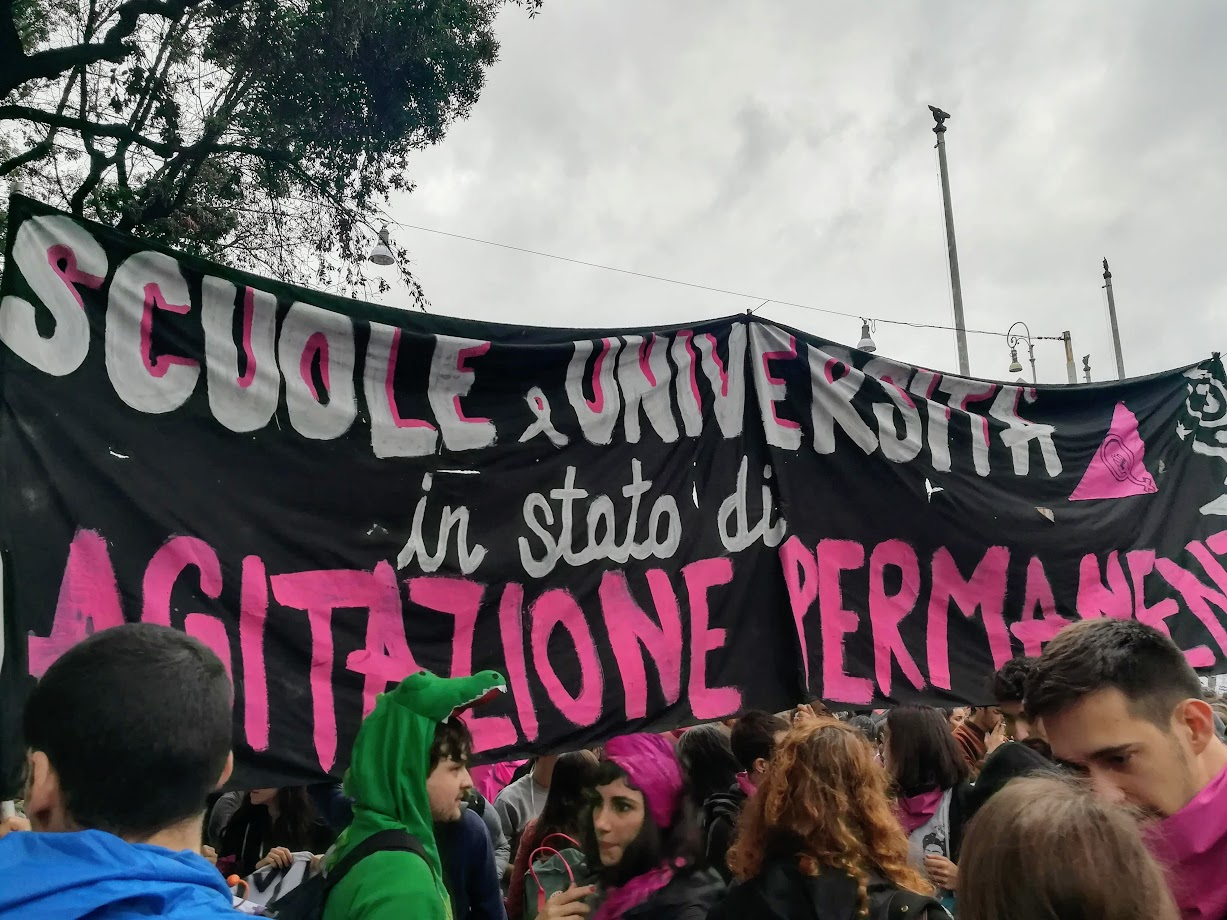

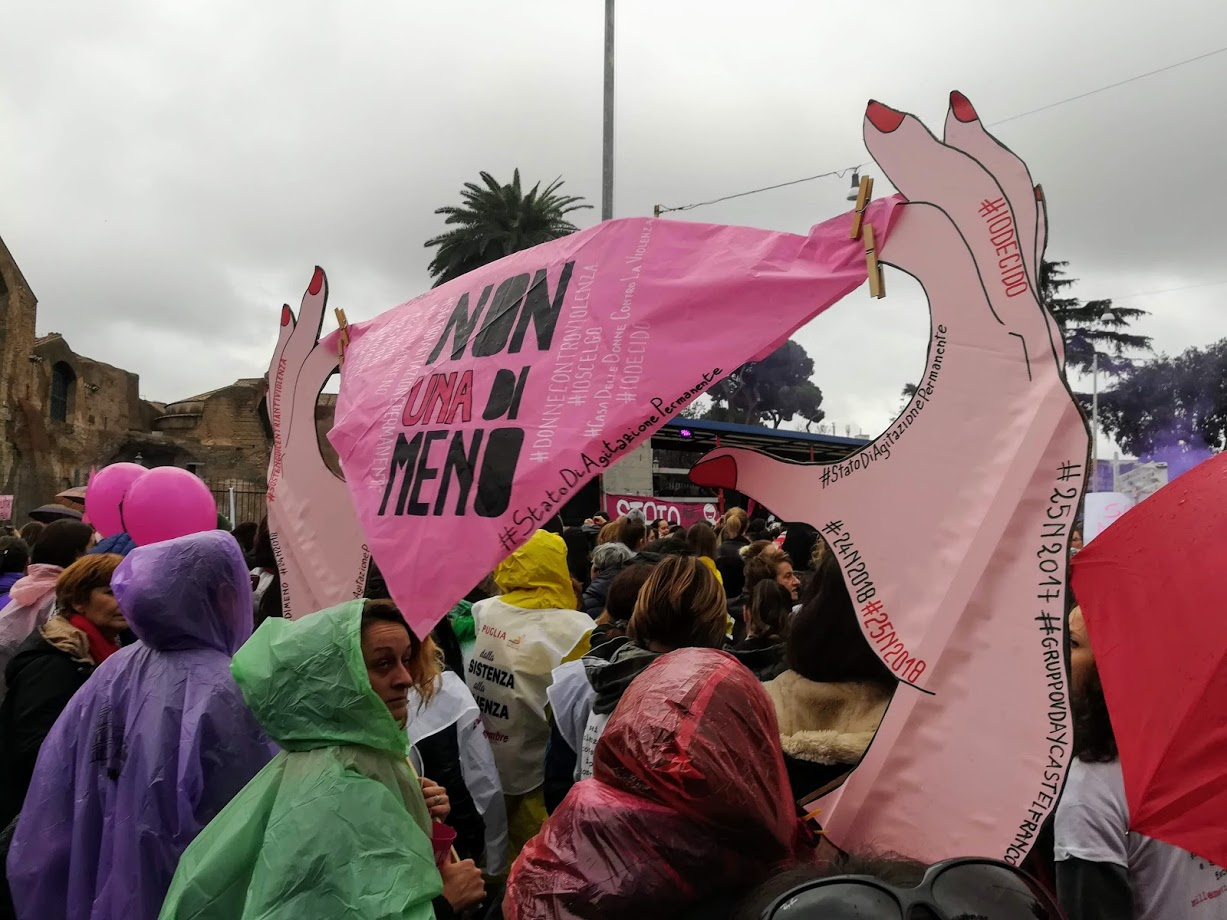

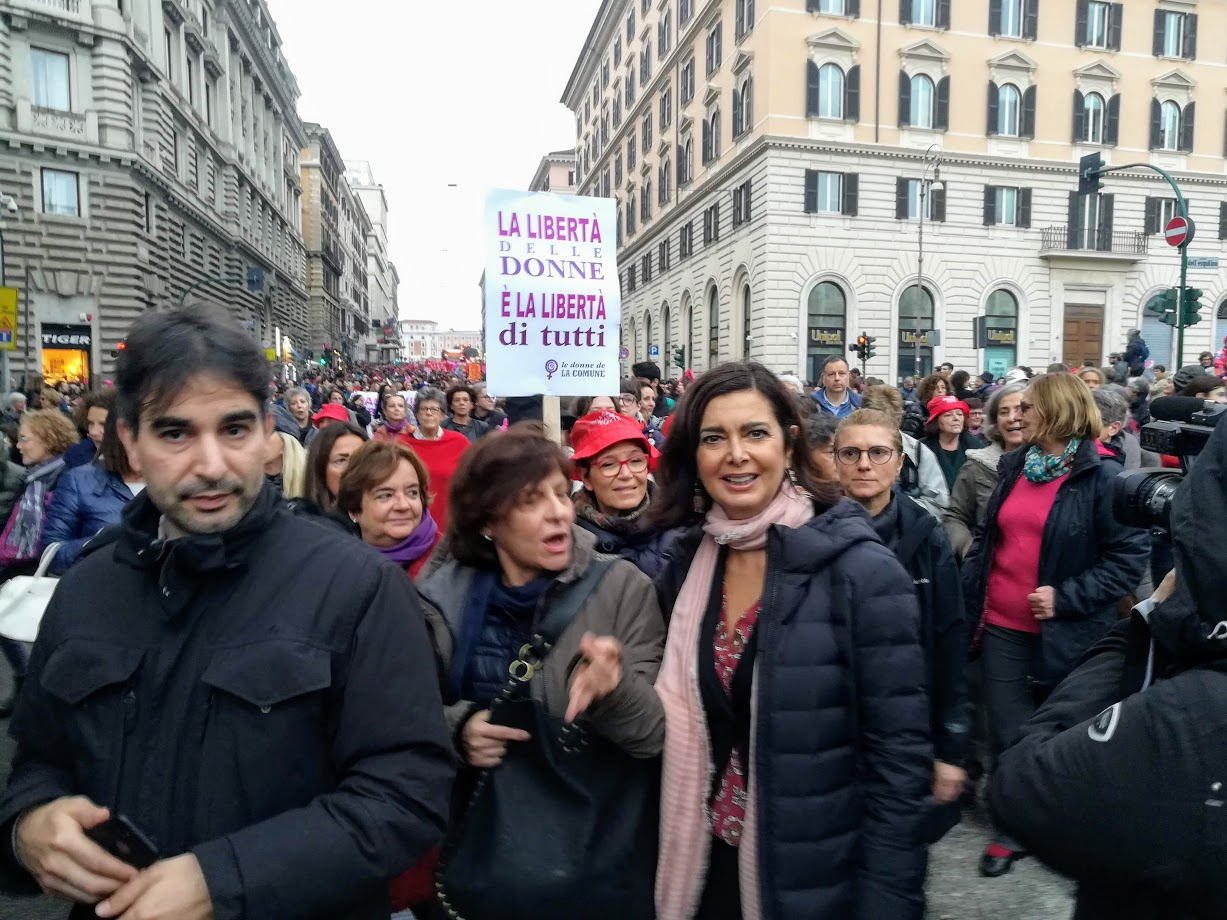

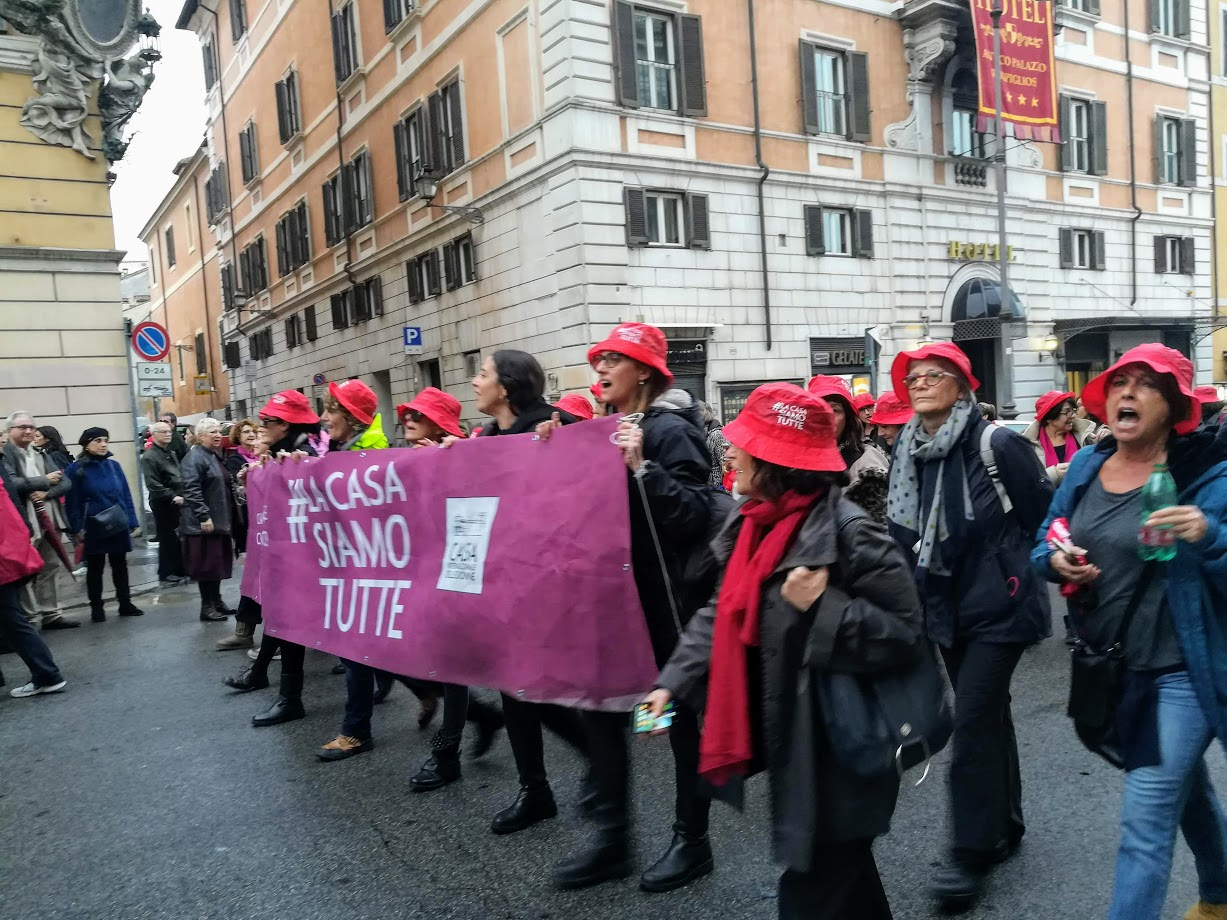

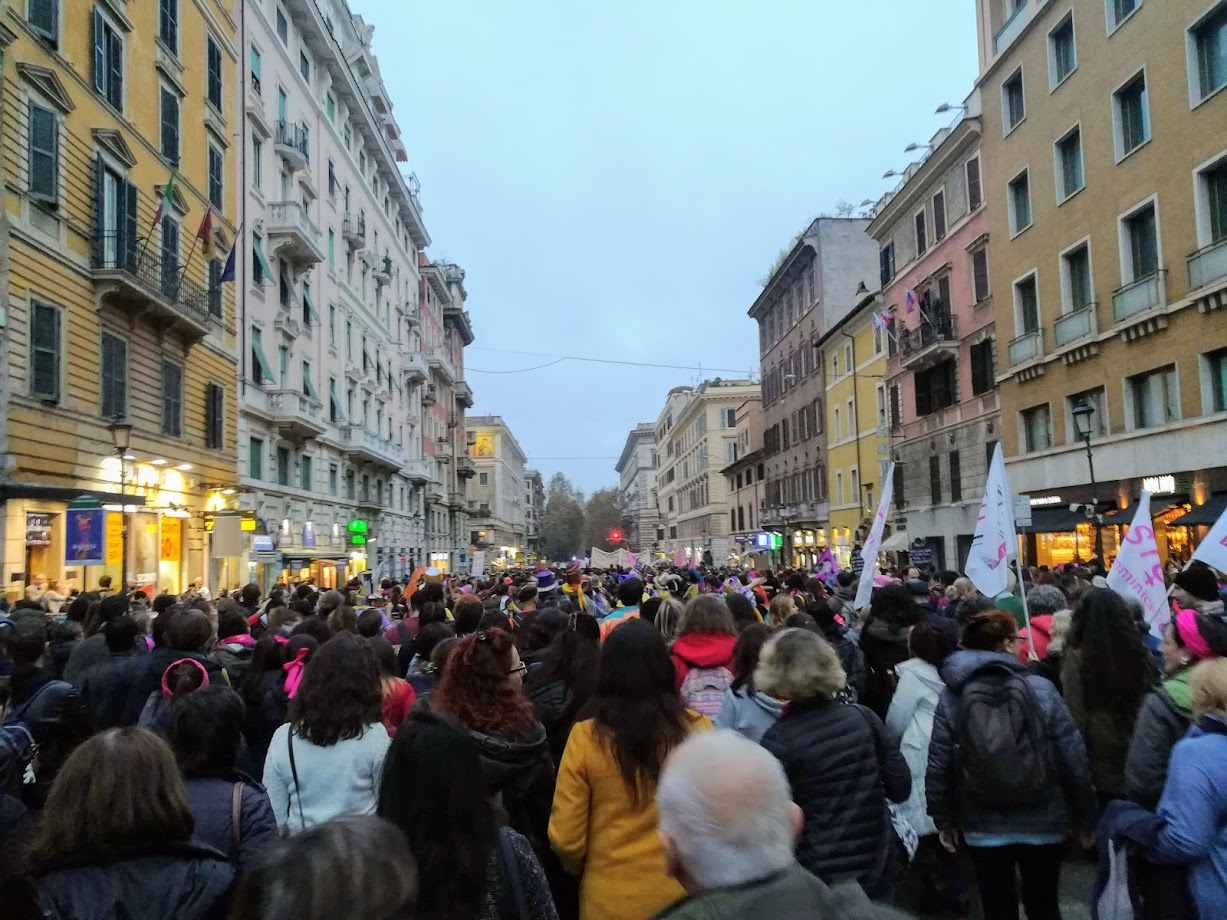

== Data on violence against women ==
=== Australia ===
A March 2013, article on The Conversation featured an article entitled "Ending violence against women is good for everyone" in relation to the observance of International Women's Day on that year. The article states that, while a general Australian belief exists that violence against Australian women is less severe in comparison to other nations, the Australian Bureau of Statistics had revealed in a report that "one in three Australian women will experience physical violence in their lifetime, while 23% to 28% will experience sexual or emotional harm." The statistics were taken from a report, published in 2005 (reissue), entitled "Personal Safety Survey Australia".

The Conversation article by Linda Murray and Lesley Pruitt then provided further Australia-specific data: "Violence is the leading cause of death, illness and disability for Australian women aged 15 to 44. It's responsible for more illness and premature death than any other preventable cause, such as hypertension, obesity, or smoking." The article refers to The National Plan to Reduce Violence against Women and their Children 2010-2022 that was published by the Australian government in September 2012—the foreword of the Plan states:

The National Plan sets out a framework for action over the next 12 years. This plan shows Australia's commitments to upholding the human rights of Australian women through the Convention on the Elimination of All Forms of Discrimination against Women, the Declaration to End Violence Against Women and the Beijing Declaration and Platform for Action.

In September 2014, Australia's VicHealth released the results of the National Community Attitudes towards Violence Against Women Survey. This was the third of a series of such surveys, the first dating from 1995, and the second from 2009. The information was gathered by telephone interviews with over 17,500 Australian men and women aged over 16 years, and indicated a continuing need for future prevention activity.

=== Italy ===
The latest data from the Italian Institute of Statistics point out that of the over 49,000 women who asked for help from the anti-violence centres in 2017, 64% had children, almost all of them minors, and 27% were foreign citizens. Of these, more than 29,000 have started their journey out of violence.

== International ==
Reports from UN Women and the World Health Organization revealed that approximately 736 million women worldwide have reported experiencing sexual violence or physical abuse.

== Human Rights Day ==
The date of the International Day for the Elimination of Violence Against Women also marks the start of the "16 Days of Activism" that precedes Human Rights Day on December 10 each year.

== Roses Revolution Day ==
Roses Revolution, an international movement against obstetric violence founded in Spain in 2011, gave the day an additional designation as the Roses Revolution Day. Affected women place roses in front of hospitals and delivery rooms to protest against violence they have experienced during childbirth, including messages to physicians and midwives. Roses Revolution is supported by the German National Committee of UN Women.

== See also ==
- Declaration on the Elimination of Violence Against Women
- EGM: prevention of violence against women and girls
- International Day of Zero Tolerance for Female Genital Mutilation
- International Day for the Elimination of Child, Early and Forced Marriage
- National Day of Remembrance and Action on Violence Against Women on December 6 in Canada.
- Stop Violence Against Women, a campaign of Amnesty International
- White Ribbon Campaign
