= Red Shoes =

Red Shoes may refer to:

== Film and TV ==
- Red Shoe Diaries, a 1990s American anthology series
- Red Shoes (2022 film), a Mexican-Italian drama film
- Red Shoes, a 2023 Japanese film starring Hayato Ichihara
- Red Shoes (TV series), a 2021 South Korean TV series
- Red Shoes and the Seven Dwarfs, a 2019 South Korean animated film

== Music ==
- "Red Shoes", a song by English band Midas
- "Red Shoes", a song by Chris Rea from the 1991 album Auberge
- "Red Shoes", a song by Dick Morrissey from the 1986 album Souliloquy
- "Red Shoes", a song in the Little River Band album Live in America
- "(The Angels Wanna Wear My) Red Shoes", a song from the 1977 Elvis Costello album My Aim Is True
- Akai Kutsu ("Red Shoes"), a 1922 Japanese children's song

== People ==
- Red Shoes (Choctaw chief), assassination in 1747 sparked a British and French War
- Red Shoes (Muskogean chief), leader who died in 1783
- Red Shoes Unno, New Japan Pro-Wrestling referee, father of Shota Umino

== Other uses ==
- Papal shoes, traditionally red shoes worn by the head of the Roman Catholic Church
- Red Shoes (missile), a British surface-to-air missile
- A character in the novel Shell Shaker by LeAnne Howe
- Red Shoes (protest), art display created by Elina Chauvet to protest Gender Based Violence

== See also ==
- The Red Shoes (disambiguation)
