= National Citizen Observatory on Femicide =

The National Citizen Observatory on Femicide of Mexico (Spanish: Observatorio Ciudadano Nacional del Feminicidio de México, OCNF) is a Mexican central entity of citizen participation focused on the exercise of the defense of human rights with a gender perspective. It has been a reference body for the accompaniment of victims of gender violence since 2007, it has also supported to review cases and requests for the declarations of Gender Violence Alert against women in Mexico.

== History ==
In 2003, the creation of the Observatorio Ciudadano para Monitorear la Impartición de Justicia was promoted with the purpose of following up on the cases of femicides in Ciudad Juárez and Chihuahua. In the following two years, the Observatory presented two reports issuing recommendations that were taken up by the Inter-American Court of Human Rights as evidence in the judgment of the Campo Algodonero case, the first judgment in which the Court adopts the gender perspective on the international responsibility of the Mexican State for the lack of follow-up in the investigations related to the disappearance and murder of Claudia Ivette González, Esmeralda Herrera Monreal and Laura Berenice Ramos Monárrez.

In 2007, after the publication of the General Law on Women's Access to a Life Free of Violence, María de la Luz Estrada called for the creation of the National Citizen Observatory on Feminicide (OCNF). In this year, the OCNF initiated an investigation on gender violence in the country to make the situation visible and contribute to the creation of efficient mechanisms for the prevention, punishment, and eradication of this problem. From January 2007 to December 2008, 1221 homicides against women and girls were documented in 13 Mexican states. As of 2008, the Observatory demands the implementation of the declaration of Alerta de Violencia de Género contras las Mujeres in the State of Mexico.
