= Máynez =

Máynez is a Spanish surname. Notable people with the surname include:

- Alberto Maynez, 19th-century Governor of New Mexico
- Alejandro Máynez (born 1970s), Mexican serial killer
- Eduardo García Máynez (1908–1993), Mexican jurist
- Jorge Álvarez Máynez (born 1985) Mexican politician
