= Femicides of the cotton field =

Serial murders in Mexico

The Femicides of the cotton field (Spanish: Feminicidas del campo algodonero) is the media name for murders committed by two Mexican serial killers, Edgar Ernesto Álvarez Cruz and José Francisco Granados de la Paz (born 1979). Both were active between 1993 and 2003 in the city of Ciudad Juárez. According to his own statements, Granados kidnapped, tortured, raped, and murdered at least 8-10 young women, but according to the Attorney General of the State of Chihuahua, they murdered at least 14 women. This corresponded to the 8 corpses found in cotton fields in the city's outskirts and 6 more found in Mount Cerro Negro, also adjacent to the city.

== Background ==
=== Apprehension of Francisco Granados ===
Granados was an assiduous consumer of cocaine, had a long criminal record in the United States, consisting mainly of low-impact crimes such as illegal entry and residence in the country and consumption and possession of illicit substances; there are records that indicate that Francisco's first arrest was made in 1995, when he was 16 years old, on charges of illegal stay in the country and resisting arrest.

In 2003, he was detained by the police in El Paso, Texas, the Texas Ranger Division, under the charge of illegal stay in the country.

=== Confessions ===
While in the custody of the Texas police in 2006, Granados confessed to having participated in at least 10 murders of women, perpetrated between 1993 and 2003. In his statements, he indicated that he was not fully aware of what he did, as he committed his crimes while drugged:

"...I told some cousins, a cousin bought me a pizza and asked me what I had, I told him it was because of the deaths in Juárez, that I felt used and that I was threatened as a minor and drugged with benzos twice. I told him that I had killed two women, he looked at me and said 'It's not true, do not tell me anything...'

— Francisco Granados during a press conference in 2008

He identified Edgar Ernesto Álvarez Cruz as the alleged mastermind of between 10 and 17 murders. He also mentioned the participation of a third man, Alejandro Delgado Valles, known as El Calas, who was later exonerated. He indicated that Álvarez used to provide him with drugs during the crimes, so he did not remember the exact events.

== Crimes ==
According to statements by Francisco Granados, the women were kidnapped or taken with deception to unpopulated areas of the outskirts of the city, inside Álvarez's car, an eighties-model Renault. This was where they were tied and raped, then mutilated and murdered in the midst of satanistic rituals chaired by Álvarez, who used to dissect the hearts of his victims. The bodies were buried or simply abandoned in vacant lots, with some buried in Álvarez's own home. In later investigations, a corpse was exhumed on the premises of Álvarez's home.

=== Possible victims ===
In his confession, Granados identified 6 murdered women, and mentioned a sixth and seventh victim whom he partially identified only under their supposed names:

- Mayra Juliana Reyes Solís
- Esmeralda Herrera Monrreal
- Laura Berenice Ramos Mónarrez
- Claudia Ivette González
- Verónica Martínez Hernández
- Guadalupe Luna de la Rosa
- Rosario ("Chayito"): she supposedly died when she was intentionally run over by Álvarez with his car.

== Court proceedings ==
=== Intervention of the Inter-American Court of Human Rights ===
The intervention of the Inter-American Court of Human Rights was based on requests from victims' relatives, who filed a complaint against the Mexican State, motivated by the lack of response from the same.

In 2005, the Inter-American Court approved and admitted the case, and in January 2007, it accumulated the files of González, Monrreal, and Mónarrez, whose bodies were found in Juárez's cotton fields.

On November 16, 2009, the court issued a judgment against the Mexican State.

From the sentence that was issued, the following recommendations were highlighted:

1. Conduct the criminal process properly
2. Publicly acknowledge their international responsibility
3. Unveil a monument in memory of the victims

== See also ==
- Belém do Pará Convention § Impact
- Female homicides in Ciudad Juárez
- The Ciudad Juárez Rebels
- Abdul Latif Sharif
