= Campo Algodonero in Cd. Juarez =

Memorial site in Chihuahua, Mexico

Coordinates: 31°39′37.067″N 106°21′29.637″W

Campo Algodonero in Ciudad Juárez, Chihuahua, Mexico, is the memorial site for hundreds of women who have died during the past two decades. The Algodonero became an important site after eight women were found dead in 2001. This memorial site was recently created after the verdict of the Inter-American Court of Human Rights against the State of Mexico in regards to the case of the Algodonero field where eight women were found dead. The memorial site includes a statue of a woman, made by Veronica Leiton, and multiple pink crosses that represent the women who were found. Campo Algodonero serves as a standing symbol of memory that dwells in the lives of all of the victims’ families who refuse to stay quiet and who are constantly in the middle of controversy.

== History ==
In the border city of Juárez, Chihuahua, Mexico, over 1,900 people have died in 2019 alone. And over the past three decades, hundreds of them have been women. When the North American Free Trade Agreement (NAFTA) was signed major corporations began the establishment of maquiladoras in Cd. Juarez. The maquiladoras generated job opportunities for men and women who began working inside and outside the factories. Maquiladora jobs were usually long shifts that ended late at night when women are vulnerable to sexual harassment, rape and death. Cd. Juarez then became the city where violence is at its highest peak because of the drug war and many other factors. Maquiladora women workers are not the only ones affected by the violence. The majority of those murdered and who disappeared are women and girls who work at local retail, students, teachers, and sex workers. Many people began calling this situation a feminicide because of the degree of violence and high numbers of dead women in Juarez. Nearly a decade since the first body was found dead and with signs of torture, the international human rights system responded to public demands for justice. In 2002, petitions against the state of Mexico were presented to the Inter-American Court of Human Rights (IACtHR). It took the court approximately seven years to come up with a verdict. In April 2009, the Inter-American Human Rights court ruled that the state of Mexico was accountable for the murders, ordering the government to pay the legal cost of the victims’ families, reopen investigations about the murder cases, and investigate those government officials who were once accused of obstructing justice. The IAHRC also obligated the state to build a memorial site. "

== Timeline ==
- November 6, 2001 – In an open field known as "Campo Algodonero" the bodies of eight women who appeared to have been raped and tortured were found. The identified women were: Esmeralda Herrera Monreal, Laura Berenice Ramos Monárrez, Claudia Ivette González, María de los Ángeles Acosta Ramírez, Mayra Juliana Reyes Solís, Merlín Elizabeth Rodríguez Sáenz, and María Rocina Galicia. These girls ranged from 15 to 19 years old."
- March 2002 – Three of the victims' mothers, Irma Monreal Jaime, Benita Monarrez, Josefina Gonzalez present a petition against the state of Mexico to the Inter-American Commission on Human Rights. "
- February 4, 2005 – The Inter-American Commission on Human Rights admitted individual petitions of Esmeralda, Claudia Ivette, y Laura Berenice.
- November 4, 2007 – The Inter-American Commission on Human Rights filed the lawsuit against the state of Mexico.
- April 20, 2009 – The mothers of the victims of femicide traveled to Chile for a trial against the state of Mexico. The mothers under The Inter-American Commission argued that the deaths of the women were not investigated correctly and well.
- November 2009 – The Inter-American Human Rights Court ruled in the case of Campo Algodonero v. Mexico. The court declared Mexico responsible for the murders of three young women. The court then ordered that the government pay the victims’ families compensation and hold a ceremony to apologize. In addition, it was ordered that the government build a memorial to the victims.
- November, 2011 – Years after the ruling against the state of Mexico, Campo Algodonero became an "official memorial" funded by the government after the international court found Mexico guilty of neglecting the femicide in Ciudad Juarez. During the inauguration, Deputy Government Secretary Felipe Zamora, representing President Felipe Calderon, gave a public apology for the government's failure to prevent the killings of the women. However, the ceremony was interrupted by the victims’ relatives who showed up with candles, banners, and photographs of the dead and missing young women.

== Location ==
Campo Algodonero is located in Cd. Juarez coincidently across from the maquiladora industries headquarters. The open field has crosses around that are painted in the iconic pink color with the victims names. Rosa-Linda Fregoso describes the memorial as a very clean, modest looking site. The walls mark its perimeters that separate the park from the memorial site. It has sandstone colored walls, paths, blue-mosaic waterways and a walkway where it then leads to marble-top stone benches. The location of the benches seems to be designed as a space for the public to reflect on what they see.

Fregoso goes on to describe in detail the engraving of the walls and the focal points of the memorial site. To the right of the entrance there is a plaque that dedicates the memorial "To the memory of the women and girl victims of gender violence in Ciudad Juarez." Moreover, in a marble-encased panel on a wall, the names of the women found at Campo Algodonero were engraved (Claudia Yvette González, Laura Berenice Ramos Monárrez, Esmeralda Herrera Monreal, Maria de los Ángeles Acosta Ramírez, Mayra Juliana Reyes Solís, Veronica Martinez Hernandez, Merlín Elizabeth Rodríguez Sáenz, y María Rocina Galicia). Next to the plaque is a wall that is partly filled with the names of women who were murdered as well. In addition, there is a large cross that is painted pink that pays tribute to the mothers’ who campaign for justice. Lastly, one can also find a large bronze sculpture "Flor de Arena" designed by Veronica Leiton.

== Architecture ==
Veronica Leiton the artist, who designed and created the sculpture, is Chilean who has grown to be very attached to Cd. Juarez. Leiton named the sculpture "Flor de Arena." In an interview with Rosa Linda Fregoso, Leiton explained the meaning behind the details of the sculpture. She explained that each of the 15 different flowers represented one hundred of the women who have disappeared. Leiton stated that the women themselves symbolize all of the "strong and young women" who have lost their lives. One of the most symbolic part of the statue is the heart. According to Leiton, "the heart contains the memory of the women’s pain and suffering, which the water flowing onto the fifteen roses is meant to soothe and cleanse." As the architect of the statue, Leiton hopes that one day "the people will recapture public spaces like the Campo Algodonero memorial, transform them into sites of alternative truth-telling and memory, empowering and unifying the community in the struggle for justice and social change."

== Memory Dwelling ==
In the book Where Memory Dwells the author, Macarena Gómez-Barris, elaborates on what is the real meaning of memory and what memorial sites mean to the public. She states that memorial sites "contain important clues about the afterlife and memory of violence." Those important clues about the "afterlife of violence" are the reason why some governments are against building memorial site. In Rosa Linda Fregoso article, she states that "government resist demands for a public memorial to traumatic event in the history of the nation, refusing to take full responsibility for human rights abuses, preferring instead to 'forget', 'move on' and 'put the nation’s past behind'".

However, the reason why many others favor memorial sites is because as Gómez-Barris states, memory dwells and throughout time it represents a "lingering presence, one that persists, insists, resists, and exceeds the containment of these bodies and of the nation’s boundaries, the afterlife of the event of violence." The constant presence of memory serves as a constant reminder to other victims’ families. According to Robin Wagner-Pacifici and Barry Schwartz, each memorial site like Campo Algodonero, are created to "conceived and built by those who wish to bring to consciousness the events and people that others are more inclined to forget." A reminder that they shall continue to seek justice for their lost.

== Controversy ==
During the inauguration, controversy sparked over the memorial site as many of the victims’ relatives felt that the government should be aware of its responsibility to investigate the deaths and prevent future deaths. The relatives of victims did not attend the event because they felt that the memorial site was not finished since the names were not engraved anywhere on-site in order to honor the women and girls. Furthermore, some people felt that the apology should have been made by a higher level official instead of Deputy Government Secretary Felipe Zamora. The fact that Felipe Zamora was representing President Felipe Calderon, did not make the apology completely sincere to the victims’ relatives. The state of Mexico did not comply with the agreement that was made to engrave the names of the victims and the plaque with the names of the eight girls causing the mothers and other relatives to be angry and decide to rally against the inauguration ceremony.

One of the main arguments from the victims’ relatives is that the state of Mexico is doing little to no work in investigating the murders in Ciudad Juarez. Many of the investigations of the women's murders remain unsolved since 1993 to the controversial case in 2001. Although the case Campo Algodonero v. Mexico ruled against Mexico and required them to make a memorial, the victims’ relatives are calling for better police investigation. Monica Ortiz Uribe interviewed relatives, whom many shared their desire for police to investigate and find their daughters alive. Fregoso as well mentioned the chants of the mothers during the inauguration, "No queremos un monumento, las queremos a ellas. "Vivas las llevaron, vivas las queremos," ("We don’t want a monument, we want our daughters. They were taken alive, we want them back alive"). They do not want to just be presented a monument of their deaths; they want the deaths to end.

== Media ==
The official website of Campo Algodonero is linked to a Twitter account. The account has over eight thousands followers and is following other accounts that focus on women's rights. Campo Algodonero's Twitter account is utilized as the foundation of sources that informs the community when a woman goes missing or is found dead. However, their Twitter account does not only focus on the femicide of Cd. Juarez, they also focus on other countries, like Argentina, Chile, Colombia, India, etc., controversies regarding women.

== See also ==
- Feminicides in Ciudad Juárez
