= Daniel López =

Daniel López may refer to:

- Daniel Lopez (athlete) (born 1968), American Olympic athlete
- Daniel López (cyclist) (born 1994), Spanish racing cyclist
- Daniel López (footballer, born 1969), retired Chilean footballer
- Daniel López (footballer, born 1992), Spanish footballer
- Daniel López (footballer, born 2000), Mexican footballer for Club Tijuana
- Daniel López (water polo) (born 1980), Spanish water polo goalkeeper
- Daniel López Nelio (1949–2004), Mexican politician
- Daniel López Ramos (born 1976), retired Spanish footballer
- Daniel López Romo (1945–2024), United States Attorney for the District of Puerto Rico, Brigadier General and assistant adjutant general for Air, Puerto Rico Air National Guard
- Dani López (footballer, born 1983), Spanish footballer for Iraklis Thessaloniki F.C.
- Dani López (footballer, born 1985), Spanish footballer for Inverness Caledonian Thistle
- Daniel Alejandro López (born 1989), tennis player from Paraguay
- Daniel Audiel López Martínez, Mexican serial killer
- Daniel Lee Lopez (1987–2015), American convicted of murder of police officer Lt. Stuart Alexander. Executed by lethal injection in Texas
- One of the fake identities used by the dictator Augusto Pinochet
