= Ciudad Juárez Rebels =

Mexican serial killers

The Ciudad Juárez Rebels was the self-imposed name of a group of Mexican serial killers who were active between 1995 and 1996 in Ciudad Juárez, and are responsible for several feminicides in the city. The group was led by Sergio Armendáriz Diaz (born 1980) and Juan Contreras Jurado. Three other members of the group were sentenced in 2005: Carlos Barriento Vidales, Gerardo Fernández Molina and Romel Omar Ceniceros Garcia.

All of the members were convicted of eight murders, but their victim count is suspected to be between 10 and 14. According to the detainees themselves, they worked as hitmen for Abdul Latif Sharif, a convicted murderer suspected of homicides in the city, but this could not be verified.

== Crimes ==
On April 7, 1996, the torso of a woman was found in a vacant lot on the outskirts of the city, in a property called Lomas de Poleo, as well as several bones belonging to other victims. The torso belonged to Rosario García Leal, a 17-year-old employee at a Philips store who disappeared on December 7, 1995; she allegedly died of a craniecephalic contusion, while still alive she was raped and tortured. There were cuts on her body from a sharp weapon and sperm was found in her vagina. On the victim's clothes the letter "R" was found had been marked through rips, and a business card of a man named "Hector" was also found.

The exact day of García's death is not known, but it is believed to have been sometime around February 1996. Her murder was atypical to other related cases because they had kept her alive for a relatively long time, which had not happened in other cases.

After their arrests, the five men confessed to having murdered eight women, although they later recanted and claimed to have been tortured by the police to plead guilty. Erika Fierro, a woman member of the gang who came to be related to the killings but could not be held accountable, would declare that Armendáriz once told her that he wanted her to present a friend of hers, to whom she only referred to as "Mausy":

"She did not want to talk to him, but I insisted and she went in. Then I did not see her again, I knew he was going to kill her, but I could not do anything else because he had threatened to kill me." (Erika Fierro; 1996)

== Apprehension ==
On April 8, 1996, a member of a local gang called "Los Rebeldes", Héctor Olivares Villalba, was arrested. He eventually confessed to having participated in the kidnapping of García on December 7, 1995, and her subsequent murder by several members of the gang, including Armendáriz, nicknamed "El Diablo".

That same year, 10 members of the gang were arrested, among them Carlos Hernández Molina Mariscal, Héctor Olivares Villalba, Romel Omar Garcia Ceniceros, Erika Fierro and Fernando Gremes Aguirre. The latter were later released because there was no evidence of their responsibility in the kidnappings, rapes and murders.

== See also ==
- List of serial killers by country
