= Juárez station =

Juárez station may refer to any of the following stations in Mexico:

- Juárez metro station, in Mexico City
- Juárez light rail station, in Guadalajara, Jalisco
- Juárez (Mexico City Metrobús, Line 3), a bus rapid transit station in Mexico City
- Juárez (Mexico City Metrobús, Line 4), a bus rapid transit station in Mexico City
- San Nicolás metro station, in Monterrey, formerly named Juárez

== See also ==
- Juárez (disambiguation)
