= Pippa Bacca =

Italian feminist artist (1974–2008)

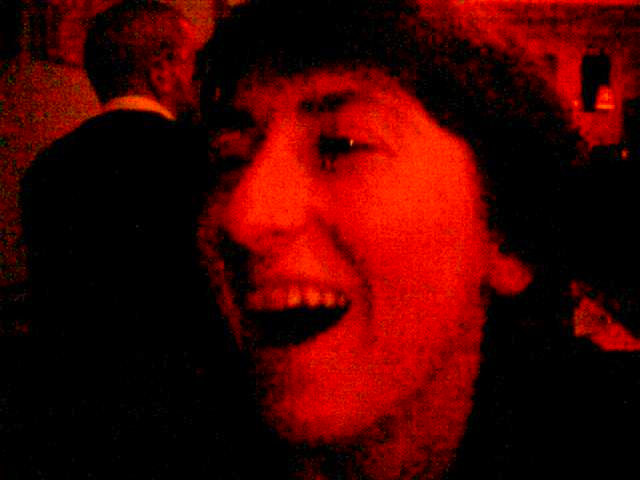
- Born: Giuseppina Pasqualino di Marineo; December 9, 1974; Milan, Italy
- Died: March 31, 2008 (aged 33); Gebze, Turkey
- Cause of death: Strangulation after gang rape
- Occupations: Feminist; artist

Giuseppina Pasqualino di Marineo (9 December 1974 – March 31, 2008), known as Pippa Bacca, was an Italian performance and feminist artist.

On 31 March 2008, Pippa Bacca disappeared in Gebze, Turkey, during an international hitchhiking trip to promote world peace under the motto "marriage between different peoples and nations". Bacca and fellow artist Silvia Moro were symbolically wearing wedding dresses during their trek.

On 11 April 2008, the Turkish police arrested a man who later confessed to her rape and murder and led the authorities to her body.

== Biography ==
=== Early life ===
Pippa Bacca was born in Paderno Dugnano, near Milano on 9 December 1974, as Giuseppina Valeria Laura Maria Pasqualino di Marineo. Her father, Guido Pasqualino di Marineo, was originally from Naples and descended from Neapolitan nobility. Her mother, Elena Manzoni dei Conti di Chiosca e Poggiolo, likewise came from an affluent noble family of Sicilian origin. Bacca's mother was the older sister of the artist Piero Manzoni.

Bacca was the third of five sisters and also had a half-brother from her father's remarriage. As children, their mother dressed Bacca and her sisters all in green to make them recognisable and to not lose them. As an adult, Bacca would decide to always wear the color green, and would write all her letters and postcards in green ink. Bacca would become a vegetarian, but once a year indulged herself and ate fish.

As her uncle Piero Manzoni died before her birth, Bacca never met him; but her mother Elena safeguarded her brother's artistic legacy and preserved his art. Bacca grew up well aware of her uncle's artistic work, and she and her siblings were raised "breathing the same creative air" as their uncle.

Despite the family's consideration of themselves as nonconformist, Bacca and her family were, in many ways, conservative with devoutly Catholic and pro-monarchist values. Both her parents were politically active; her father, was the leader of the Italian Monarchist Union political party in the 1970s, while Bacca's mother, was involved in the Italian Democratic Socialist Party and considered a right-wing liberal, as well as engaged in the Silenzia Maggiore (Silent Majority) movement that had formed as a reaction to the 1968 student protests in Italy.

Bacca's parents separated when she was five years old, and later divorced in 1987 when she was 13. Afterwards, Bacca's and her mother and sisters lived in the Azienda Lombarda Edilizia Residenziale public housing units, located in Corso Garibaldi. Sharing a strong family bond, the sisters called themselves "Il Neurone" ("The Neuron"), as they felt they were part of one neuron.

From a young age, her mother instilled a love of travelling in Bacca, and the family explored Italy and Europe in an old van. In 1987, Bacca, her mother, and her sisters travelled the pilgrim road to Santiago de Compostela, making their way by walking, biking, and hitchhiking.

== Education ==
Bacca attended a classical high school (liceo classico), with a focus on Italian and foreign literature, history, philosophy, and art history. Bacca had thoughts about pursuing a degree in mathematics, but instead of continuing her studies after her graduation Bacca decided to travel to Ireland, where she spent a year before returning to Italy to find work.

On her return, she lived with her mother and sister Maria. Bacca found part-time work in an interbank call centre, through which she would support her artistic endeavours. Bacca also worked for the Archivo Opere Piero Manzoni (Archive of the Works of Piero Manzoni) between 1998 and 2003, where she assisted the art historian Germano Celant with compiling a catalogue raisonné of her uncle's art.

As an adult, Bacca leaned towards the left politically but continued to be a believer and practitioner of the Catholic faith. She often wore a chain around her neck with the image of Saint Joseph of Cupertino, patron saint of undisciplined students.

== Artistic work ==
Sometime around 1995, Bacca started seriously pursuing being an artist. Her first solo exhibition, Angeli: vita, morte e miracoli (Angels: Life, Death and Miracles) took place in 1999 at the Slobs Gallery in Milan, using cut-out silhouettes on colored paper and cardboard. Her second exhibit Matres Matutae was held in 2001. Like her first exhibit, this one was also done with silhouettes but inspired by votive offerings to the Indigenous goddess Mater Matuta, representing different aspects of motherhood. Another exhibition followed in 2002 with La luna nel pozzo ("The Moon in the Well") at the Galleria Fondo Perduto ("Lost Fund Gallery"), where Bacca explored the theme of femininity by retracing the phases of the moon in 14 works, from new moon to full moon.

Bacca was also drawn to performance art, an expression that seemed to align with her personality. For example, on one occasion Bacca went to meet a boyfriend at the Bergamo railway station where she dressed up as a mermaid and bathed in the fountain in front of the station. While dating another boyfriend, he broke up with her, telling Bacca that he was not in love with her. In response, Bacca had 1,500 badges printed with the words "I am in love with Pippa Bacca, Ask me why!" and distributed them all over Milan to make sure her ex-boyfriend would see them and notice how many people were in love with Bacca, so that he would reconsider his decision.

According to some sources, however, Bacca's artistic projects and eccentric lifestyle were not one and the same, though it might appear as such to outsiders. It has also been said that Bacca's aim was not to make a career as an artist but the pursuit of art for its own sake.

Hitchhiking held great interest for Bacca, and she travelled both with her family and on her own in countries such as the United States, Canada, Ireland, Spain, Russia, and Turkey. During the sometimes long wait for a lift, Bacca would recite the Rosary. Bacca was also very familiar with the lives of saints and would talk at length about them when in company. Incorporating her hitchhiking into her artistic work, she photographed people who gave her a lift and also later recorded their conversations. These photographs were used in her 2004 exhibition Più oltre ("Further On") in Perugia.

Bacca worked with different media including photography, collage and embroidery. Her 2004 piece, Surgical Mutations, consisted of a series of leaves cut-out as to resemble different floral species.

In 2006, Bacca had her first institutional solo exhibition, The Broken Image at the Fabbrica del Vapore ("Steam Factory") in Milan. As a member of the art collective Coniglio Viola (Purple Rabbit) around this time, she also helped to curate some exhibitions.

Another artistic project of Bacca's begun in 2007 was Boules de brouillaird [English: balls of mist] which inspired by the book of short stories "Il ponte della Ghisolfa" by Milanese author Giovanni Testori. Bacca would photograph people on the streets of Milan whom Bacca envisioned as modern versions of the characters of the book. These photos would then be put in glass jar with grappa and flour and then shaken with the dispersion of the grains of flour in the liquid; the effect would be that of mist (scighera in the Milanese dialect) around the photos.

She was also a singer and joined the Coro di Micene ("Mycene Choir"), an historically anarchist choir in Milan, but went on to start her own choir, Bubble Gum, in the summer of 2005. Their finale number was always Bésame Mucho, but after her death the choir always ended with the song Moon River, a favourite of Bacca's. For the choir's performances, she would take on the persona of Eva Adamovich with an outfit that included a black wig and a green ostrich boa, playing out a statement she made in 1997: that she had five different aspects to herself, or rather five alter egos:

- The aforementioned Eva Adamovich, who wore only high heels, tight dresses, very heavy makeup and a wig. Although she called everyone "love" and "sweetheart", she trusted no one; and said that she was a virgin because she was forever linked to her first love, who died in tragic circumstances. To further emphasise that they were two different people, Pippa Bacca and Eva Adamovich had different telephone numbers.
- Pippa Pasqualino di Marineo, the hardworking employee of the call center where Bacca worked.
- Pippa Bacca, her artist persona, who was very social and had many friends. Originally the name of a doll Bacca had owned as a child and a diminutive of "Giuseppina", she had been known by this name since her school days. It has also been claimed that when her half-brother was a child, he was unable to say the name "Giuseppina", which instead came out as Pippa, then went on to add Bacca to the name, because it means cuddle in the Milanese dialect and reminded her of the god Bacchus.
- The Green Rabbit (Il coniglio verde), whose body was covered by a green cloak. This alter ego appeared only rarely.

Bacca herself was also the subject of other artists. For instance, Camilla Micheli photographed Bacca's two personalities "Pippa Bacca" and "Eva Adamovich" posing as Gabrielle d'Estrées and one of her sisters, a 16th-century painting, with the title of "Ritratto presunto di Pippa ed Eva" (Presumed Portrait of Pippa and Eva).

== "Brides on Tour" Project ==
Sometime before 2004, Bacca attended the wedding of a friend, whose concern about getting her white gown dirty made Bacca think about how strange it was that a piece of clothing used for just one special day could hold such importance. This was her inspiration for the "Brides on Tour" project. In 2006, she started working on a performative piece, "Brides on Tour" to promote world peace with fellow artist Silvia Moro. In the two years preceding the project, Bacca learned Arabic so as to be able to communicate with the people she would meet between Turkey and Jerusalem.

The artists, wearing white wedding dresses, departed from Milan on 8 March 2008, travelling through the Balkans and arriving in Turkey 12 days later. They had planned to hitchhike through the Middle East, their final destination being Jerusalem. Referring to their attire, they reported on their website: "That's the only dress we'll carry along–with all stains accumulated during the journey."

== Disappearance ==
After travelling together across Europe, Bacca and Moro split up just prior to their arrival in Istanbul, planning to meet up again in Beirut. Bacca was last seen on 31 March. Her credit card was reportedly used at noon of that day. On 12 April, her naked, strangled, and decomposing body was found in bushes near Gebze, about 60 km southeast of Istanbul.

The man who led the police to her body, Murat Karataş, was detained and arrested after reportedly confessing to raping and strangling Bacca on 31 March after taking her in his Jeep from a gas station. DNA testing suggested that Bacca had been raped by multiple people, not just Karataş. The suspect said he was "under the influence of drugs and alcohol" and could not remember what happened. He had been traced after he inserted his own SIM card into the victim's cellphone, which alerted police because he had a previous conviction for theft. Bacca's own information was wiped from the mobile device, implicating, according to the lawyer for Bacca's family, at least one other accomplice because Karataş could not speak English and had left school after the third grade.

== Funeral ==
Bacca's funeral took place on 19 April 2008, in front of the San Simpliciano church in Milan. Over a thousand people gathered, including politicians Letizia Moratti and Barbara Pollastrini and representatives of the Turkish authorities. Sidewalks and houses in the vicinity of the church were decorated with green balloons and banners. Bacca's coffin was also covered in a cloth in her favourite color green. The choir she had started performed during the ceremony.

Bacca was buried in the family tomb in Casirate d'Adda in the dress she wore on her tour, as it was the dress she wore at the time of her death. According to her mother, she was also buried with a pair of her favorite green patchwork dungarees, the ostrich boa she had worn as Eva Adamovich, and a gold chain with the medal of Saint Joseph of Cupertino.

Bacca's alter ego Eva Adamovich got an obituary in the newspaper Corriere della Sera ("Evening Courier"), where it was stated that she had "departed for a never-ending tour of the Bahamas".

== Aftermath ==
In the aftermath, Bacca's sister Maria gave a statement to the Italian news agency ANSA: "[Bacca's] travels were for an artistic performance and to give a message of peace and trust, but not everyone deserves trust… We weren't particularly worried because she had been hitchhiking for a long time, and thus was capable of avoiding risky situations… She was a determined person when it came to her art".

The Turkish president Abdullah Gül called the Italian president Giorgio Napolitano to express his grief. A commentary in Today's Zaman, while expressing sadness for the woman's death, criticised the supposed obsequiousness of Turkish politicians to "foreigners" in the Bacca case, writing: "Let's face it, if Pippa were a Turk, some people would feel free to say that a hitchhiking woman deserves to be raped." The columnist argued that local problems such as violence against women should be addressed regardless of Turkey's concern for being shamed before foreigners. Hürriyet ("Liberty"), a top selling Turkish newspaper, printed an article on the murder, entitled "We are ashamed". On the occasion of the 2009 Art Festival in Faenza, the Istanbul Biennial director Fulya Erdemci made a public apology on behalf of her country.

Bacca's fellow traveler Silvia Moro returned to Milan and stopped making art after the murder.

== Legacy ==
Bacca was not a well-known artist outside Milan before her death, but the circumstances of her death have made her a symbol for women's vulnerability and she has come to represent resistance and resilience. Critics, however, have pointed to the risk artists take in pursuit of artistic endeavours. Even so, Bacca's final project has continued inspiring others in many different expressions and mediums:

The performance artist Carolina Bianchi processes her own sexual assault in her piece "Cadela Força" ("Bitch Strength") by taking a knockout drug, and while still conscious, she talks about the femicide of Bacca.

For her 2010 project "My Letter to Pippa", Turkish documentary filmmaker Bingöl Elmas dressed in black as a symbol of grief and travelled the same road as Bacca while documenting her own journey. Turkish artist Nezeket Ekici created Tooth for Tooth, an eight-channel video installation in 2016 as a tribute to women murdered in Turkey.

The painter Franco Biagioni, who depicted events in a series of paintings in his l'Archivio Dipinto della Memoria (The Painted Archive of Memory) in a style reminiscent of votive paintings, depicted the death of Bacca in one of them.

In 2011, Italian artist Nadia Impala recorded the song "Correndo con le forbici in mano (Ode a Pippa Bacca)" ("Running with Scissors in Hand [Ode to Pippa Bacca]").

In 2013, the band Radiodervish released the album Human, and its first song, "Velo di sposa" ("Bridal Veil"), was in memory of Bacca.

Elina Chauvet, a Mexican artist, was inspired by Bacca's story for her Corazón Abierto ("Open Heart") piece in 2012 and dedicated her project "La Confianza" ("Trust") to Bacca, consisting of white gowns embroidered with red thread to depict messages and images. The work was exhibited at the Dior Gallery in Paris.

In 2024, it was announced that a film would be made about Bacca's life, produced by the Palermo-based production company Tramp Limited and directed by Levi Riso.

Ti sei vestita di bianco (You Dressed in White), an exhibition at the MURATS (Museo Unico Regionale dell'arte Tessile Sarda) (Sole Regional Museum of Sardinian Textile Art) in Samugheo, Sardinia, was inaugurated in May 2024 to pay tribute to Bacca and "all women who undertake journeys of discovery and personal growth, inviting us to reflect on the universal values of love, hope and solidarity".

== Tributes ==
In 2008, a women's compassion movement in Konya, Turkey, named one of its women's shelters after Bacca.

In 2012, a documentary about Bacca's story, La Mariée (The Bride), was directed by Joël Curtz, featuring video archives from her camera that the film team had been able to recover.

In 2020, three events honoured Bacca: The White Dress, a semi-fictional book about her last days, by Nathalie Léger (translation from French); Bermdans in bruidsjurk (Roadside Dance in Wedding Dress), a non-fiction book exploring the events leading up to her death, by Sarah Venema (in Dutch); and the dedication of a public garden by the city of Milan in the Brera district.

== See also ==
- Frank Lenz, American adventurer who disappeared in Ottoman Turkey while cycling
- Kayla Mueller, American activist and aid worker abducted by ISIS and later killed
- List of solved missing person cases (post-2000)
- Murders of Louisa Vesterager Jespersen and Maren Ueland

== Bibliography ==
- Pippa Bacca, Eva e le altre, Cambi Editore, Poggibonsi, Italy, 2016.
