= The Red Shoes =

The Red Shoes may refer to:

- "The Red Shoes" (fairy tale), a 1845 fairy tale by Hans Christian Andersen

== Film ==
- The Red Shoes (1948 film), by Michael Powell and Emeric Pressburger, inspired by the fairy tale
- The Red Shoes (2005 film), a Korean horror film inspired by the fairy tale
- The Red Shoes (2010 film), a love story from the Philippines

== Other uses ==
- The Red Shoes (musical), a 1993 Broadway musical composed by Jule Styne based on the 1948 film
- The Red Shoes (ballet), a 2016 ballet choreographed by Matthew Bourne
- The Red Shoes (album), an album by Kate Bush, 1993
  - "The Red Shoes" (song) the title song from the Kate Bush album
- "The Red Shoes," the lead single from IU's 2013 album Modern Times
- The Red Shoes, an attraction in the Fairytale Forest of the Dutch amusement park Efteling

== See also ==
- Red Shoes (disambiguation)
