= Roses Revolution =

International movement

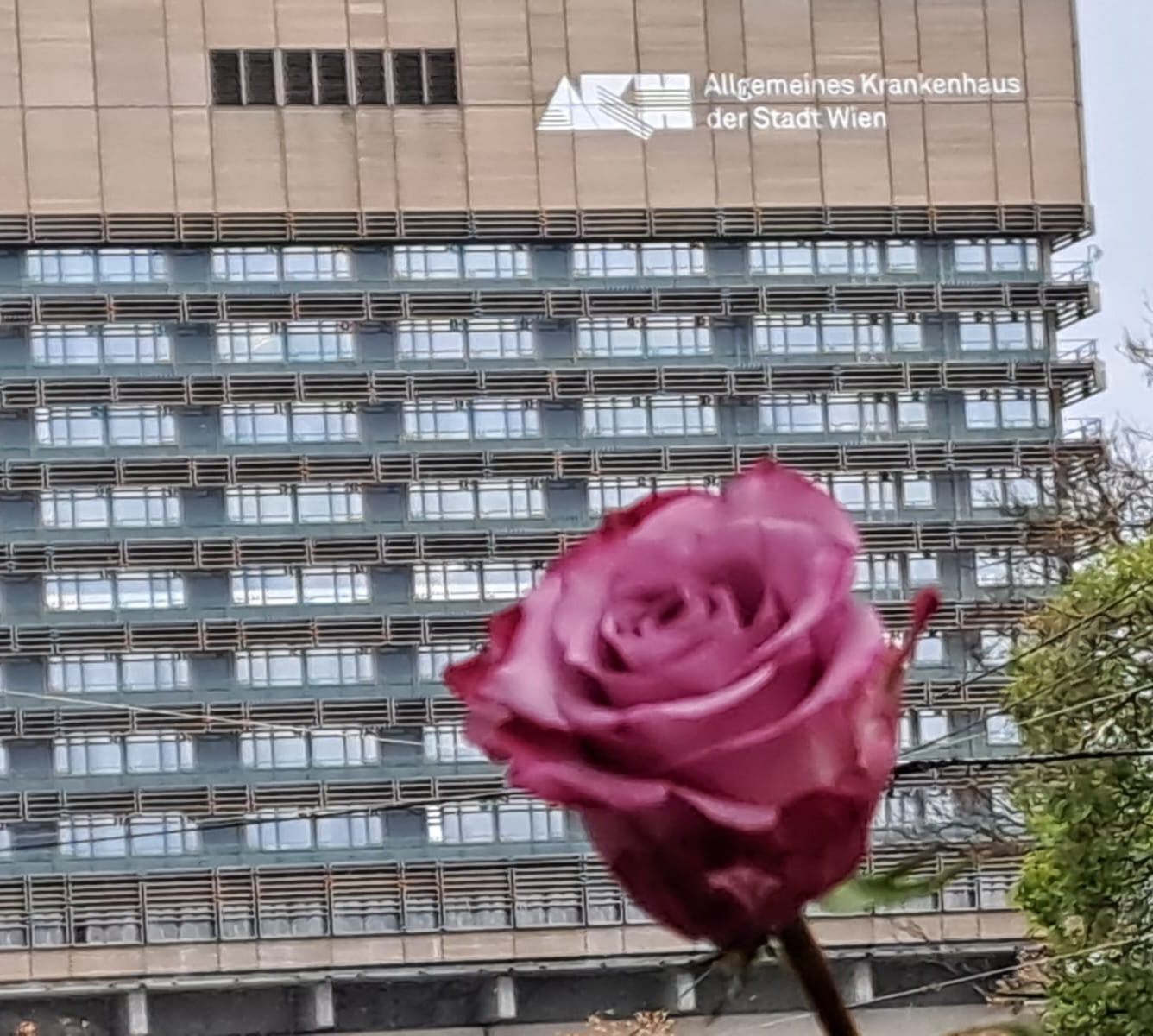
A rose on Roses Revolution Day 2023 in front of Vienna General Hospital

Roses Revolution is an international movement against obstetric violence, originally founded in Spain in 2011. It observes November 25, the International Day for the Elimination of Violence against Women, additionally as "Roses Revolution Day". Women place roses in front of the delivery rooms or hospitals where they suffered varying forms of physical or psychological violence as a sign of protest.

== Background ==
The WHO maintains that "Every woman has the right to the highest attainable standard of health, which includes the right to dignified, respectful health care", but "many women experience disrespectful and abusive treatment during childbirth in facilities worldwide. Such treatment not only violates the rights of women to respectful care, but can also threaten their rights to life, health, bodily integrity, and freedom from discrimination." WHO therefore "calls for greater action, dialogue, research and advocacy on this important public health and human rights issue." Roses Revolution is one of several initiatives worldwide against this form of violence.

== Activities ==
Roses Revolution designates the protest against abuse during childbirth as an additional aspect in connection with the International Day for the Elimination of Violence against Women on November 25, introduced in 1981 and an official UN awareness day since 2000. On Roses Revolution Day, women place roses outside hospitals and delivery rooms to protest against the physical or psychological violence they have experienced during childbirth, often including messages to pertinent physicians and midwives.

Roses Revolution comments on the depositions of roses on social media like Facebook and Instagram. The aim is to raise awareness of traumatic experiences caused by the misconduct of medical staff during childbirth. Support also includes other measures. For example, in 2021 Roses Revolution Luxembourg published a video on women who had suffered violence in both French and Luxembourgish. Roses Revolution Hungary (Rózsák Forradalma) takes part in the regional activities of the 16 Days of Activism against Gender-based Violence.

== Founding and expansion ==
Spanish birth activist Mara "Jesusa" Ricoy founded Roses Revolution as "La Revolución de las rosas" in 2011. At the third "Human Rights in Childbirth" conference in Blankenberge, Belgium on 4 November 2013, the movement was presented to international participants. Within three weeks, this led to action in Italy, France, Great Britain, Slovakia, the Czech Republic, Mexico, Brazil und Colombia. Finally, Roses Revolution became active in 30 countries.

== Recognition ==
Roses Revolution is supported by the German National Committee of UN Women. A 2019 United Nations report by Dubravka Šimonović, the United Nations Special Rapporteur on Violence Against Women, titled "A human rights-based approach to mistreatment and violence against women in reproductive health services with a focus on childbirth and obstetric violence" lists Roses Revolution as one of several initiatives on national and international level. The Austrian Ministry of health and social affairs lists Roses Revolution as a point of call for affected women in their report on women's health of 2022. A European Union study on Obstetric and gynaecological violence in the EU requested by the European Parliament Committee on Women's Rights and Gender Equality mentions Roses Revolution multiple times as being active in the EU countries Spain, Germany, Luxemburg, Lithuania, France, Czechia, Italy, Austria and Slovakia - among other aspects being "the mother of all campaigns" against obstetric violence in Germany.
