= Elina Chauvet =

Mexican artist

- Chauvet with "Red Shoes" in Italy
- Born: 1959 (age 66–67); Casas Grandes Municipality
- Education: Autonomous University of Ciudad Juárez
- Occupation: artist
- Known for: artwork that protests against gender based violence including "Red Shoes"

Elina Chauvet (born 1959) is a Mexican artist known for her artwork titled Red Shoes. She has created a range of art that protests against gender based violence and Femicide in Ciudad Juárez in particular.

== Life ==
Chauvet was born in Casas Grandes Municipality in 1959. Chauvet studied architecture in Chihuahua at the Autonomous University of Ciudad Juárez, but she had no training as an artist. She took courses in a wide range of media including painting, photography, pottery, printmaking and photography. She had eight solo exhibitions between 1996 and 2013.

== Works ==
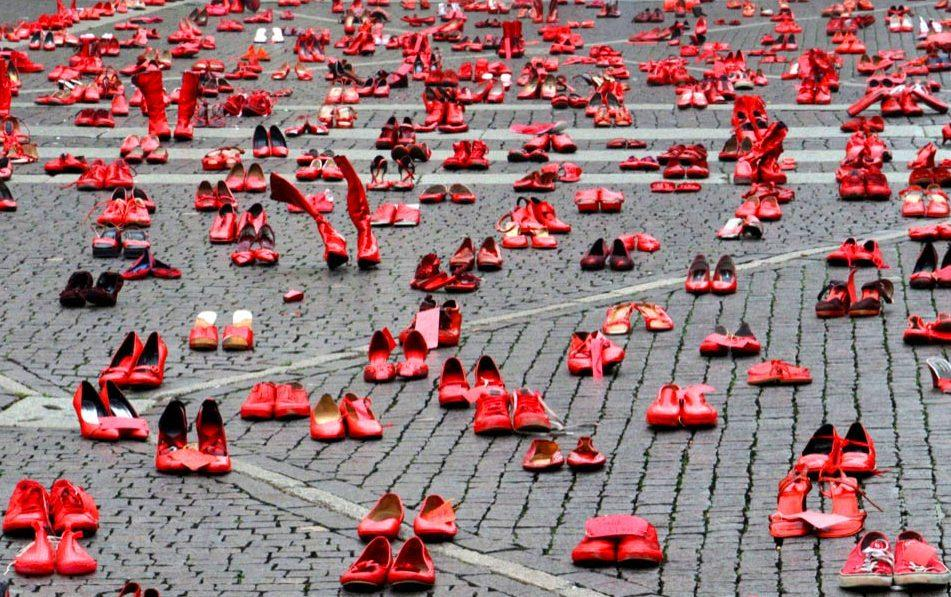
Zapatos rojos

In 2009 Chauvet created, "Red Shoes" and this became one of her most successful pieces. She had been inspired by the death of her sister due to domestic violence. Red Shoes originally consisted of 33 pairs of empty red shoes laid out in Juárez on the road that led to the United States border. It is believed that hundreds, if not thousands, of women have been murdered there. The word Femicide is said to have been first used in the town. Her Red Shoes work was recreated over 80 times in different countries. Moreover, the wearing of red shoes has been used as a sign of solidarity. In 2026 the piece was recreated on Boston Common.

Two artists, Pippa Bacca and Silvia Moro, had decided to hitch in wedding dresses for their journey for world peace. The event ended with Bacca's murder. Chauvet was inspired by Bacca's story for her Corazón Abierto ("Open Heart") piece in 2012 and dedicated her project "La Confianza" ("Trust") to Bacca, consisting of white gowns embroidered with red thread to depict messages and images. The work was exhibited at the Dior Gallery in Paris.

In 2017 she exhibited a car door with fifteen bullet holes and the trajectory of each bullet is illustrated with multicoloured rods. The piece was called R-15 and it was shown at Mazatlán Art Museum. She took the opportunity to deride the museum for not including enough local artists.

In 2023 she created an embroidered piece in the style of a piece of routine embroidery of a woman and flowers created with red threads. The English translation of the title is “You look prettier when you’re quiet.” It was one of her hand-embroidered textiles titled Heridas Domesticas (Domestic Wounds).

She featured on the front page of Vogue México y Latinoamérica (Vogue Mexico). A solo exhibition in Mexico took place in 2024. It was titled "The Promise" and it included classic white wedding dresses with red needlework.

== Legacy ==
The Mayor of Mexico City (who became President Claudia Sheinbaum) created a special Femicide squad. The number of Femicide murders in Mexico has fallen from 1022 in 2001.
