= Villa Juárez =

Villa Juárez is the name of the following places in Mexico:

- Villa Juárez, Aguascalientes, a town and municipality
- Villa Juárez, San Luis Potosí, a town and municipality
- Villa Juárez, Sonora, a municipal seat
