= Abuse during childbirth =

Form of abuse against women

Abuse during childbirth (obstetric violence or disrespectful care) is generally defined as interactions or conditions deemed humiliating or undignified by local consensus and interactions or conditions experienced as or intended to be humiliating or undignifying. Bowser and Hill's 2010 landscape analysis defined seven categories of abusive or disrespectful care, including physical abuse, non-consented clinical care, non-confidential care, non-dignified care, discrimination, abandonment, and detention in health facilities.

This treatment is regarded as a form of violence against women and a violation of women's rights. It is a recurring issue in facilities around the globe, according to World Health Organization studies, and can have serious consequences for mother and child. Namely, abuse during childbirth may prevent women from seeking pre-natal care and using other health care services in the future. Adolescents, unmarried women, women of low socioeconomic status, migrant women, women infected with HIV, and ethnic minority women are at a greater risk of experiencing obstetric violence.

== Definition and forms of abuse ==
The World Health Organization notes that abuse during childbirth has yet to be conclusively defined or measured scientifically. However, abuse during childbirth is generally defined as neglectful, physical abusive, and/or disrespectful treatment from healthcare professionals towards patients in childbirth. Such mistreatment is regarded as a violation of the woman's human rights.

Abuse during childbirth can occur over a wide spectrum and may be seen in the forms of non-confidential care, non-dignified care, discrimination, overt physical abuse, non-consented care, abandonment of care, and/or detention in facilities.

== Epidemiology and consequences ==
Investigations into the prevalence of abusive practices in childbirth have been conducted by the World Health Organization. Their studies demonstrate that women giving birth in medical facilities experience disrespectful, abusive, and/or neglectful treatment frequently and globally. From their research, women have been seen as insignificant factors of the birthing process. There is evidence by the WHO to prove that during this vulnerable time, women are more likely to receive procedures without their knowledge and consent.

A 2020 study centered in Ghana, Guinea, Myanmar, and Nigeria found that more than 40% of observed women and 35% of surveyed women experienced mistreatment while in childbirth. Furthermore, adolescents, migrant women, women infected with HIV, and ethnic minority women were deemed more likely than others to experience abuse during childbirth.

Several systemic and sociocultural barriers continue to place women at a disadvantage in society. These include antiquated gender roles that cause physicians and others to view women as weak or vulnerable. Women in childbirth are very vulnerable and often cannot protect themselves against mistreatment, so the consequences of obstetric violence can be serious for both the mother and the child. It is often difficult to escape the gender bias in healthcare, which causes women to feel unsafe when considering asking for help or ways to protect themselves. The abusive relationship that forms between a woman and her healthcare providers as a result of abuse during childbirth often leads to the woman developing a general mistrust of healthcare services. Many cases of nonconsensual medical procedures during birth can cause someone to relive past traumas of sexual assaults or rape. Furthermore, consequences can be extended to include a reluctance to seek pre-natal care, medical assistance during childbirth, and other health care services in the future.

== Law and Ethics ==
=== Legal Authority in Childbirth ===
In medical situations, people with enough mental capacity have the right to make decisions for themselves, and that includes refusing care. In the United States, this right does not always apply to pregnant women, as fetal rights are highly considered during birth.

Birth is a subject discussed in human rights laws that are recognized internationally by many countries. Courts in Europe decided that women were safe from any court interference with their decisions during or about childbirth.

Women often lack information to properly consent to medical procedures. Healthcare providers will leave out pertinent information, or refuse to answer questions posed by expecting mothers. Healthcare professionals have authority as doctors, and this authority is used over women to override their decisions. This lack of decision making power can lead to ethical dilemmas for healthcare workers.

The prevalence of obstetric violence has caused women to accept this as the norm. Survival is seen as the bare minimum, ignoring the trauma faced by new mothers. Obstetric violence is different from other forms of medical violence, and is often studied as such. This type of mistreatment is starting to be viewed as a human rights issue by many scholars.

== Geography ==
=== North and South America ===
Some sources refer to North American obstetricians and gynecologists, especially between the 1950s and 1980s, practicing what was called the husband's stitch, which involves placing extra stitches in the woman's vagina after the episiotomy or the natural tearing that occurs during childbirth. This procedure would theoretically increase the husband's future sexual pleasure, but often caused long-term pain and discomfort for the woman. There is no proof that such a practice was widespread in North America, but mentions of it frequently appear in studies about episiotomy in certain American countries such as Brazil.

There has been a more recent highlight on North American doctors' treatment of pregnant women. The growing idea is that there has been a "redressing" of obstetric violence and that women's right to choice has been compromised in some situations. In instances where the lives of the woman and the fetus are endangered, the woman has the right to refuse care through procedures such as caesarean section, episiotomy, or vacuum-assisted delivery. Women are often coerced into having these invasive procedures, even though such coercion has been found to cause long-lasting damage, with many women comparing the experience to rape.

The term "obstetric violence" is particularly used in Latin American countries, where the law prohibits such mistreatment. These laws exist in several Latin American countries, including Argentina, Puerto Rico and Venezuela. The First International Conference for the Humanization of Birth, which took place in Brazil in 2000, brought together South and Latin American countries to discuss obstetric violence. This conference allowed researchers to come together to recognize the abuse towards women giving birth and to create a network (RELACAHUPAN) that would demand rights for birthing women.

Research into obstetric violence at two public hospitals in Mexico, analyzing the birthing experiences for one month of 2012, found that physical abuse, verbal abuse, and discrimination occurred openly throughout the facilities. Women receiving government-assisted insurance were subjected to the most discrimination from the healthcare professionals.

=== Africa ===
Tanzania is an African country with a history of abuse during childbirth. In 2011, Shannon McMahon and others explored whether or not the supposed interventions to decrease the prevalence of abuse during childbirth had been effective. When interviewing women, they initially referred to their experiences as neutral or better. However, after being shown the different aspects of abuse, an overwhelming majority of the women actually reported experiencing abuse during childbirth. In 2013–2014, Hannah Ratcliffe and others formed a study to explore possible interventions to improve the experiences of women in childbirth. They implemented an "open birth day" that facilitated communication between patients and providers and educated them on the procedures surrounding birth. The team also implemented a "respectful maternity care workshop" meant to create conversation surrounding respect between health care staff and patients. What they found was that this approach was successful in helping reconstruct systems without costing much. There was an increase of 60% in satisfaction with women's delivery experience. During the same time period as Ratcliffe's study, Stephanie Kujawaki and others did a comparative study of births with and without interventions. The baseline for the study was conducted in 2011–2012, and the final half of the study was conducted in 2015. What they found is that there was a 66% reduction in abuse and disrespect during childbirth after interventions. This study shows that community and health system reforms can help change and reshape norms in which women are mistreated during childbirth.

=== Asia ===
In 2014–2015, Shreeporna Bhattacharya and T.K. Sundari Ravindran set out to quantitatively determine the prevalence of abuse during childbirth in the Varanasi district of northern India through the use of a questionnaire. Two rural blocks in the Varanasi district with high rates of institutional deliveries were the focus of the study, with subjects selected randomly from the women who lived in the area. Bhattacharya and Ravindran report that the frequency at which abusive behavior occurred was 28.8%, with "abusive behavior" acting as a general term. The two most common forms of abuse were non-dignified care (19.3%) and physical abuse (13.4%). Furthermore, 8.5% of patients reported being neglected or abandoned, 5.6% experienced non-confidential care, and 4.9% faced humiliation due to a lack of cleanliness. The authors also note that 90.5% of subjects were met with inappropriate demands for money. In terms of correlation, there was no significant link between socio-economic status and abuse, though women who faced complications during labor were four times as likely to experience abuse in the facilities.

Fatima Alzyoud and colleagues studied abuse during childbirth in Jordan, specifically in the forms of neglect and verbal abuse. Four government-run Maternal and Child Health Centers were used as the locations of the study, with the subjects being 390 Jordanian women aged 18–45. The Childbirth Verbal Abuse and Neglect Scale (CVANS) found that 32.2% of the subjects experienced neglect and 37.7% faced verbal abuse during their last childbirth. Furthermore, there was a negative correlation between age and neglect/verbal abuse.

== Intersectionality of obstetric violence ==
=== Race/ethnicity ===
While global maternal health research and advocacy have brought recent awareness to obstetric violence, historians have noted historical examples. In the United States of America, historians attest that it began during slavery, where enslaved women were physically exploited and experimented on by Antebellum physicians looking to advance the fields of obstetrics and gynaecology. Later, historians confirm that this took the form of forced sterilizations of black and other women of color as part of the eugenics movement. Mississippi appendectomies refer to the experience of forced and coerced sterilization of Black women between 1920 and 1980. Coined by activist Fannie Lou Hamer, Mississippi appendectomies involved Black and other women of color being sterilized without informed consent, knowledge, and without a valid medical reason. Hamer recalls having received a hysterectomy, without consent, during a surgery to remove a uterine fibroid, rendering her infertile. Researchers confirm that hysterectomies and tubal ligations were given to poor black women by medical residents allowed to "practice" surgical skills.

Scholars show that some of these historical forms of disrespectful care have persisted into the 21st century. Black mothers of all socioeconomic statuses, including Serena Williams, have detailed experiences of being ignored or dismissed while reporting signs of complications or expressing concerns during their pregnancies. A study conducted on maternal and infant health inequalities in California, found that racial inequality in maternal and infant outcomes persists within the wealthiest 20% of families. The study concluded that Black mothers and infants were two times as likely to die as white mothers and infants within this tax bracket. The researchers also found that the rates of maternal mortality among the richest Black women were just as high among the lowest-income white women. Another study noted that women of color experience mistreatment more frequently than other races, with rates of mistreatment consistently higher for them when compared to white counterparts. Research from the New York State Department of Health and the Centers for Disease Control and Prevention found that black women are three to four times more likely than white women to die from pregnancy related complications, where more than 60% of these deaths are preventable if given appropriate and respectful care.

Though studies have found that the impacts of obstetric violence are disproportionately distributed, they also show it is not limited to black women alone. A study conducted during the 1970s found that an estimated one-quarter of Indigenous American women of childbearing age were sterilized in Indian Health Service hospitals.

== See also ==
- Angel of mercy (criminology)–includes both homicide by health care workers and also harm caused to the patient with the attempt of making the health care worker look like a hero
- Birth injury
- Birth trauma (physical)
- Childbirth-related post-traumatic stress disorder
- Psychiatric disorders of childbirth
- Roses Revolution
- Symphysiotomy, described as an international medical scandal
- Transgender Pregnancy
