= Abdul Latif Sharif =

Suspected Egyptian serial killer (1947–2006)

- Born: Abdul Latif Sharif; 19 September 1947; Egypt
- Died: 2 June 2006 (aged 58); Chihuahua, Mexico
- Other name: "The Predator of Ciudad Juárez"
- Convictions: Murder, rape
- Penalty: 60 years in prison

Details
- Country: Mexico
- State: Ciudad Juárez

Abdul Latif Sharif, first name also spelled Abdel (September 19, 1947 – June 2, 2006), was an Egyptian-born Mexican chemist and chief suspect in the Juárez killings, a decade-long murder spree that began in the Mexican city of Ciudad Juárez in the early 1990s.

== Background ==
=== Childhood and youth ===
Sharif was born in Egypt as an only child. Growing up, he suffered constant sexual abuse from his father and several male relatives. Although his father was opposed to him attending school, Sharif showed signs of above-average intelligence. He also liked spending his time training carrier pigeons and going fishing in the river. When he was 12 years old, at his father's behest, he agreed to marry his 10-year-old cousin. Three years later Sharif reneged on the idea of marrying to instead travel to the United States. His family disapproved of this that anecdotally, his aunt is said to have exercised some sort of spell and witchcraft upon him.

In Egypt, Sharif studied chemical engineering at Cairo University, where he achieved an average of 9.9. Working as a high school and university instructor, he spent some time in the Soviet Union before traveling to New York and found work in cosmetics, paint, and skin-care companies. He was thought to be attractive and was found to be successful in his chosen field of profession. He somehow became quite obsessed with women during his 21-year stay in the United States. He married twice and had five other partners with whom he lived for some significant periods of time.

=== Arrival and life in America ===
Sharif emigrated legally to the United States in 1970. In New York, he had a job where he remained employed for eight years. He was later fired in 1978 because of his alcohol problems. He then moved to Pennsylvania and resided there for three years. In 1981, he moved to Florida and got employed in a company called Cercoa, Inc. It was here that he committed his first sexual assault. In 1982, he got married but quickly got divorced as a result of his violent behavior toward his wife. He became prominent as a chemist, and during a stay in Mexico he kept patents on various petrochemical processes he had invented.

== Crimes ==
=== Imputation for sexual abuse ===
According to official accounts, Sharif, as a person, was promiscuous. He was also thought to be an alcoholic and a pedophile. He purportedly tortured animals during hunting expeditions and had sexual fetishes like collecting girls' clothes. However, other sources say that these behaviors were mere fabrications by the prosecution to pass as credible accusations against Sharif.

Sharif's first account of sexual assault took place on 2 May 1981 in North Palm Beach, Florida. He tricked a woman by offering her a job as a housekeeper. He kidnapped her and later attacked, and sexually assaulted the victim. Upon release, the victim claimed that he said, "Oh, did I hurt you? You must go to a hospital."

Cercoa, Inc, his place of employment, paid for his defense. Despite having argued that the sex was consensual, Sharif was convicted on charges of assault, rape, and unlawful deprivation of liberty. He was eventually released on parole.

In August 1981, right after leaving prison, he assaulted another woman and received a sentence of 45-day incarceration. The defense was once more financed by Cercoa. Peculiarly, Sharif was not dismissed by the company until 1982.

After his dismissal, he moved to Gainesville, Florida. He remarried, but after he had beaten his wife unconscious, he was soon served with divorce papers. On 17 March 1983, Sharif was charged with sexual assault for the third time. His constant ploy was to offer a woman a job to be his housekeeper, thereby luring the victim into his home. He then proceeded to rape, beat, and threaten her with violence. The victim managed to escape and report him. In 1984, he was sentenced to 12 years in prison.

After spending only five years in prison, Sharif was released in 1989. He did not get deported back to Egypt despite the judge ruling in this favor. That same year, he moved to Midland, Texas and was hired by the transnational company, Benchmark Research and Technology. In 1991, he was arrested for drunk driving, and in 1993, he committed sexual assault again. His fee for the defense was provided by Benchmark Research and Technology. He was released on parole with the condition that he never set foot on American soil again. This was the prompt for him to move over to Ciudad Juárez but he still remained as an employee of Benchmark Research and Technology.

The charges filed against him in the United States were the following:

- Joanne Collins Poldesmink (3 March 1981 in North Palm Beach, Florida), to whom he was verbally abusive. Collins filed legal charges against Sharif, which she later dropped.
- Janet Stroven, whom he met in a hotel bar during a chemist convention. Stroven filed sexual assault charges against Sharif.
- Molly Fleming (2 May 1981), a neighbor who accused Sharif of drugging and sexually assaulting her. He was given 5 years of conditional release.
- Susan Wait is a student who lived in Sharif's home. She accused him of assault and the police arrested him for this and for transferring his parole from a previous incident. He was found guilty and sentenced to 12 years in prison for only five years and four months. While imprisoned he taught chemistry to his fellow inmates.
- Nancy Díaz from (Midland, Texas) accused Sharif of sexual assault. Charges were later dropped.

Because of these charges, Sharif was deported from the United States.

=== Murders ===
Sharif's first murder was alleged to have occurred in Mexico in March 1995. But there were indications that suggest he was molded into the serial killer profile by the Chihuahua Attorney General's Office merely as a scapegoat. There were some suspicions that he may have begun killing while residing in Pennsylvania, from 1978 to 1981, where the unresolved disappearances of several women occurred. However, it was then established that Sharif was not connected to these events.

Upon his arrival in Mexico in 1994, Sharif stayed in the affluent Rinconadas de San Marcos neighborhood of Ciudad Juárez, with expenses paid for by the company he was working for. Sharif was known to be a skilled chemist and during this time, he patented 25 chemical formulas. It was presumed that he started his prolific career as a serial killer somewhere between 1994 and 1995.

== Detention, trial and conviction ==
On 3 October 1995, Sharif was once again reported to authorities by a sex worker for sexual assault. Nineteen-year-old Blanca Estela Díaz was kidnapped and held for three days, during which time she was beaten, raped, and threatened with violence. The charges were dismissed on the grounds that, contrary to her claims, there were no signs of sexual abuse. However, the Chihuahua government was being pressured to find the perpetrator of the Ciudad Juárez femicides in Lote Bravo. Sharif, with his criminal background, was the ideal suspect for the serial killings. The Chihuahua Attorney General's Office actively sought to establish him as responsible for the series of homicides.

Within 20 minutes of his release, Sharif was apprehended for the disappearance of Elizabeth Castro García, a 17-year-old female with whom Sharif was said to have an intimate relationship. Garcia's sister, Eunice, had reported her disappearance on 15 August 1995.

A dead woman who matched Castro's description was found buried in the desert of Lote Bravo. Elizabeth Castro Garcia was later found alive and the body was that of Silvia Rivera Salas, who had disappeared in March 1995. Eyewitnesses said Salas had been kidnapped by two people in a van.

Sharif was convicted and sentenced to 60 years in prison for the death of Silvia Rivera Salas. The new criminal proceeding accused him of murdering 17 other women.

While he was in prison, the bodies of women who were raped and murdered were found in different areas of Ciudad Juárez. The authorities portrayed him to the media as a psychopathic rapist and killer, who remotely orchestrated the murders while in prison.

== Controversy ==
=== Scapegoat ===
In Ciudad Juárez, Sharif was known as a rapist with a long history of assaulting women, so it wasn't that difficult to suspect that he was also responsible for the murders that were occurring in the area. In addition to the prosecution and the Chihuahuan government, the people believed that there was a sole perpetrator. This claim reassured the families of the murdered women of the impending justice. The international press focused on the fact that although Sharif did not speak Spanish, he was a foreigner with no family and a history of sexual assault charges. For them, he was the right person to point to as the killer. Hoping to spare himself from prison time, Sharif requested an audience with the media. It would be at this point he would reveal knowledge of the real murderers and despite his scarce Spanish, he conveyed the names of Alejandro and Melchor Máynez to the press.

Alejandro was known throughout Juárez as the adopted son of a prominent Juárez businessman who owned gambling houses, bars and leisure spots along the border of El Paso, Texas. Sharif purported to have met him in a bar and heard Alejandro boasting about raping and murdering girls with the help of his cousin Melchor. The authorities did initial inquiries into that information. Sharif also claimed that Maynez's father had paid the authorities off so they won't need to pursue the investigation further. Alejandro was never bothered again to give his version of the facts regarding the details alleged by Sharif. Sharif began to talk constantly with the media, a situation deemed inconvenient by the Attorney General's Office in Chihuahua, so they had him relegated to Chihuahua prison, regarded as a most dangerous prison inmate. On several occasions and with all sorts of possible pretexts, they denied him the right to speak to his defense attorney.

Sharif was in jail and yet the bodies of raped and murdered young women continued to turn up.

Sharif's defense attorney, Irene Blancas, called out the allegations absurd. She also pointed out that Sharif was under constant threat from prison inmates. The judge, in a conversation with Sharif's lawyer, was alleged to have mentioned that the evidence presented in court wasn't enough for a conviction. However, the judge also knew that there aren't any satisfactory facts to warrant the case in Sharif's favor, and that by some strange circumstances Sharif may meet his untimely demise inside prison.

Sharif did later die in prison and the authorities merely attributed it to a cardiac arrest.

=== New Crimes ===
While Sharif was in prison between October 1995 and April 1996, 12 more femicides were committed in the city.

In 1995, The Ciudad Juárez Rebels, were arrested and charged with murdering 17 women. In that same year, The Ruteros of Ciudad Juárez, were also arrested for the same crime. Preposterous allegations were made by the authorities. They claimed that these groups were hired by Sharif to commit the murders in order to cause distractions from the actual investigation.

In 1996, Sharif faced 17 counts of aggravated material homicide, 24 counts of intellectual homicide, dozens of charges for kidnapping, sexual assault, organized crime and illegal human trafficking.

== Death ==
On June 2, 2006, Abdul Latif Sharif died, at the age of 59, in the Social Rehabilitation Center of Chihuahua.

The cause of death was cardiac arrest consistent with a hypovolemic shock generated by a chronic hemorrhage due to peptic ulcer disease. Since 2003, he had been diagnosed with liver cirrhosis subsequent to hepatitis C and alcoholic hepatitis, and a major depressive disorder. These were at least the stated cause of death according to the authorities. Sharif proclaimed his innocence until his last dying breath.

Since there were no relatives to claim and repatriate his body, his remains were buried in Mexico. His funeral was attended by the Egyptian consul in Mexico, Karim El Sadat.

To this day the body count continues as the bodies of femicide victims continue to surface. The bodies still bear the mark of the same modus operandi from the time the murders started in the early 1990s.

== See also ==
- Alejandro Máynez
- Female homicides in Ciudad Juárez
- Pedro Padilla Flores
- The Ciudad Juárez Rebels
- List of serial killers by country
- List of serial killers by number of victims

== Bibliography ==
- Antonio Mendoza, Killers on the Loose: Unsolved Cases of Serial Murder, (Virgin Books 2002), ISBN 0-7535-0681-5 – Study of unsolved serial killing around the world, including Ciudad Juárez.
- Simon Whitechapel, Crossing to Kill: The True Story of the Serial-Killer Playground, (Virgin Books 2002), ISBN 0-7535-0686-6 – Updated edition of the first detailed study of the Juarez murders.
