= Daniel Audiel López Martínez =

Mexican serial killer

- Born: 1974 (age 51–52); Manuel Ávila Camacho, Villa Corzo, Chiapas, Mexico
- Penalty: 8 years (first murder); Life imprisonment (other murders)

Details
- Victims: 8
- Span of crimes: 1998–2008
- Country: Mexico
- States: Chiapas, Chihuahua
- Date apprehended: February 1, 2011

Daniel Audiel López Martínez (born 1974) is a Mexican serial killer. Initially serving 8 years for a 1998 murder in Chiapas, he then moved to Ciudad Juárez, where he killed seven people from 2006 to 2010. For his latter crimes, he was sentenced to life imprisonment.

== Crimes ==
In December 1998, López committed his first murder, in which he killed José "El Pecas" Pérez in Chiapas, after the latter had had an affair with his wife. He was sentenced to 8 years imprisonment for this crime, and after his release in 2006, he moved to Ciudad Juárez. There, he began working as a drug dealer for La Línea, an enforcer unit for the Juárez Cartel, doing his business at a local bar called the Salón Sinaloa.

At the time, he was in a relationship with a 42-year-old woman named María Esther Aguirre Marín. López eventually convinced himself that she was being unfaithful towards him, and in November 2006, he shot her to death with a .22 caliber pistol at his home in Colonia San Felipe. In 2008, he committed a similar crime against his new girlfriend, 27-year-old Dolores Rodríguez López, whom he stabbed three times in the abdomen. In 2010, he stabbed to death yet another girlfriend, 30-year-old Teresa Carballo Flores. In all of these murders, López had convinced himself that they had been cheating on him.

Also in 2010, he would shoot dead two men, identified only as "José and Misael". The motivation for these murders is unclear, but it has been speculated that López believed they were romantic partners of his girlfriends or possibly due to drug-related conflicts. On April 3, 2010, López broke into the Colonia Anapra home of 34-year-old Carmen Ivonne Caballero González, shooting down both her and her 6-year-old daughter, whose bodies he later dumped in the outskirts of town. Caballero, a sister of his newest girlfriend, had been opposed to their relationship, which led to López's fatal retaliation.

== Arrest, confessions and convictions ==
On November 24, 2010, an arrest warrant was issued against López for the murder of Carmen Caballero. Upon learning of this, he fled to his hometown of Villa Corzo, where he would later be arrested in January 2011. He was extradited back to Ciudad Juárez, and during the interrogations, he surprised investigators by confessing not only to Caballero's killing, but to the six others he had committed in the last two years. Despite loopholes in the state's justice system, which proclaimed that a suspect couldn't be prosecuted for a crime based only a confession, López would eventually be found guilty and sentenced to life imprisonment.

== See also ==
- Female homicides in Ciudad Juárez
- List of serial killers by country
