= Alejandro Máynez =

Mexican serial killer and fugitive (born 1970)

- Born: Armando Martínez c. 1970s Mexico

Details
- Victims: 2–50
- Span of crimes: 1980s–1990s
- Country: Mexico

Alejandro Máynez (born Armando Martínez; c. 1970s) is a Mexican alleged serial killer and fugitive. Along with Ana Benavides and Melchor Máynez, he killed at least two women in Ciudad Juárez, but he is believed to be responsible for 50 victims in all. His murders are organized and motivated by sexual compulsion, committed as part of a group.

== Beginnings ==
Alejandro was an orphan. He was baptized Armando Martínez. He spent a portion of his childhood in orphanages in the United States. During the 1970s, he was adopted by Guillermo Máynez, a Chihuahua business entrepreneur and owner of approximately 20 bars and nightclubs in Juárez, and his family, who gave him his surname and changed his name to Alejandro.

== Crimes ==
During the 1980s and 1990s, Alejandro and Melchor, cousins, joined a gang of drug and jewelry traffickers that smuggled contraband into the United States. Supposedly, they were under the protection of the Chihuahuan government headed by Francisco Barrio.

In 1999, two former police officers, Víctor Valenzuela and Ramiro Romero Gómez, of the state and federal police, started a new department that specialized in femicides, accusing Alejandro Máynez of the deaths of several women:

We were in a club when he told us that he and another person were involved in raping and murdering women... (Valenzuela, Víctor; 1999)

According to Valenzuela and Romero, Máynez had enjoyed the protection of the police in his crimes. That year, Valenzuela was incarcerated on charges of narcotics sales, and Romero was executed. Earlier, in 1995, Abdul Latif Sharif was arrested and faced charges for tens of femicides; he claimed to be innocent and accused Máynez of being the true "Juárez Ripper".

=== Alejandro and Melchor ===
The Máynez cousins had begun their career as serial killers in 1988, alongside their activities as traffickers. At some point, they separated and began to kill in turns.

=== Alejandro and Ana ===
In 1998, Alejandro met Ana Benavides, who was working as a waitress at one of his family's bars. Máynez's known victims also were employed in family businesses. Instead of becoming a victim, it turned out that Ana and he shared certain proclivities. Ana was a devil-worshipping fanatic who had already claimed the lives of three people. She quickly began to take an active part in Máynez's murders.

== "El diario de Richie" ==
In 1995, a book was unveiled by an unknown author using the pseudonym "Richie". The book painstakingly compiled the events and details of several dozen murders. It is thought that Alejandro Máynez is the author of this book.

According to the manuscript, many of the women who were murdered in Juárez were killed during orgies arranged by members of organized crime, at which they used the murders as material for snuff films.

== See also ==
- Female homicides in Ciudad Juárez
- List of fugitives from justice who disappeared
- List of serial killers by country
