= Red Shoes (protest) =

Installation art targeting Femicide

- Zapatos Rojos (Spanish), Scarpe Rosse (Italian)
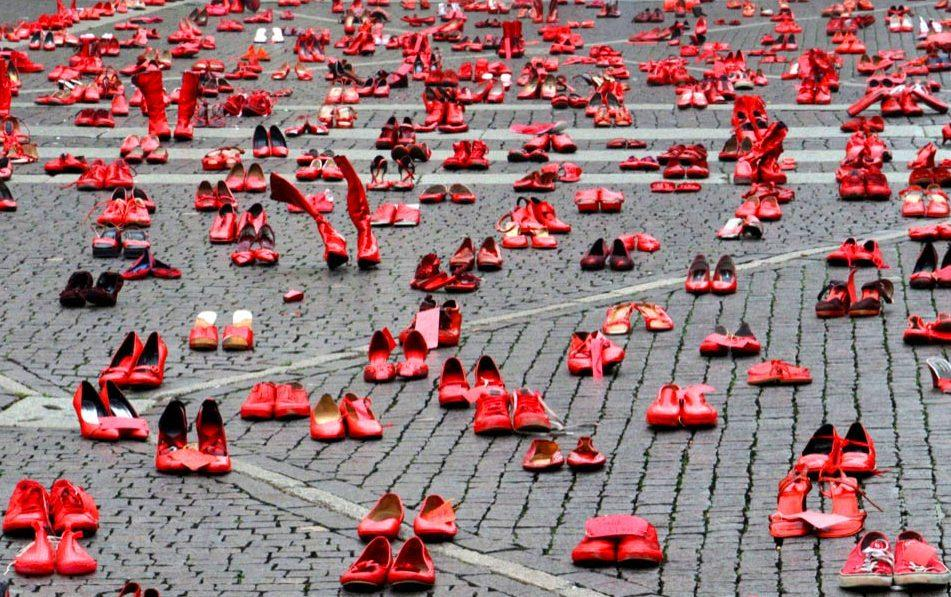
- Red Shoes example
- Artist: Elina Chauvet
- Year: 2009 onwards
- Subject: Femicide
- Location: initially Juárez in Mexico

Red Shoes was an artwork first exhibited in Mexico in 2009. Elina Chauvet arranged for 33 pairs of red shoes to be arranged in pairs on the floor. They were intended to represent the women killed in domestic violence. The artwork had been recreated in over 80 countries by 2022. The idea of wearing red shoes has been used as a sign of support for a protest against Femicide and Gender Based Violence.

== History ==
In 2009 Mexican artist Elina Chauvet created, "Red Shoes". Red Shoes became one of her most successful pieces. She had been inspired by the death of her sister due to domestic violence. Red Shoes originally consisted of 33 pairs of empty red shoes laid out in Juárez in Mexico on the road that leads to the United States border. It is believed that hundreds, if not thousands, of women have been murdered in that town. The word Femicide is said to have been first used in the town.

The artist and the creation she inspired in 2014

The second installation and the first recreation was in Mexico's Sinaloa in 2012. Chauvet collected 300 pairs of shoes to enlarge the display. On 12 April 2014 the installation was unveiled in Andria in southern Italy.

In the artist's sixtieth year, she took the artwork that had been to Michigan and Milan to Mexico City where the killings of women were getting worse. There, she displayed 300 pairs of red women's footwear on 11 January 2020 in Zocalo Square. Two mothers came and placed the shoes of their daughters within the others. These shoes once belonged to their daughters before they were killed by domestic violence.

A virtual version of #RedShoes was organised by Project Kosher on 4 June 2020. The group encouraged people to wear red shoes and post photos using #RedShoes.

The 16 Days of Activism against Gender-Based Violence in 2022 was commemorated in Lancaster. Locals including university students organised a display of red shoes in the Market Square. People were moved when they were told that the shoes represented the women killed each year.

The Red Shoes concept was recreated in 80 different countries by 2022. Moreover, the wearing of red shoes has been used as a sign of solidarity. In 2026 the piece was recreated on Boston Common.

== Netherlands and Turkey ==
It was reported that a Red Shoes protesting display, in the Dam Square in the Netherlands in 2021, was inspired by an installation in Turkey. There was no reference to Elina Chauvet, it was said to follow a similar 2018 creation by Vahit Tuna. Tuna's installation had consisted of 440 pairs of black high heels not on the floor, but on a wall. Each pair was intended to mirror the 440 women killed by men in Turkey in 2018.
