= Juárez =

Juárez or Juarez may refer to:

== Places ==
=== Mexico ===
- Ciudad Juárez, Chihuahua, a large city
- Juárez Municipality, Chihuahua
- Colonia Juárez, Mexico City, a neighborhood or colonia
- Juárez, Nuevo León, a city
- Juárez, Chiapas, a small city and municipality
- Juárez Municipality, Coahuila, a small town and municipality
- Juárez, Hidalgo, a small town and municipality
- Juárez Municipality, Michoacán, a municipality
- Sierra de Juárez, a mountain range in the state of Baja California
- Sierra Juárez, Oaxaca, a mountain range in the state of Oaxaca

=== United States ===
- Juarez, Texas, a census-designated place

== Arts and entertainment ==
- Juarez (film), a 1939 movie starring Paul Muni as Benito Juárez
- Juarez (album), a 1975 album by Terry Allen
- "Juarez", a track from the 2014 album Hesitant Alien by Gerard Way
- "Juarez", a track from the 1999 album To Venus and Back by Tori Amos

== Transportation ==
- Avenida Juárez, a street in the historic center of Mexico City
- Ciudad Juárez International Airport in Ciudad Juarez, Chihuahua, Mexico
- Juárez station (disambiguation)

== People ==
- Juárez (surname)
- Juárez (footballer) (born 1973), Brazilian former footballer Juárez de Souza Teixeira
- Juarez Machado (1941–2026), Brazilian painter
- Juarez Moreira (born 1954), Brazilian guitarist and composer
- Juarez Teixeira (1928–2026), Brazilian footballer

== Other uses ==
- FC Juárez, a football club based in Ciudad Juárez, Mexico
- Universidad Juárez Autónoma de Tabasco, the state university of Tabasco, Mexico

== See also ==
- Juárez Cartel
- Villa Juárez (disambiguation), several places in Mexico
- Huaraz, Department of Ancash, Peru, a city
