= Femicide in Ciudad Juárez =

Murder of females in Ciudad Juárez, Mexico

Muertas de Juárez
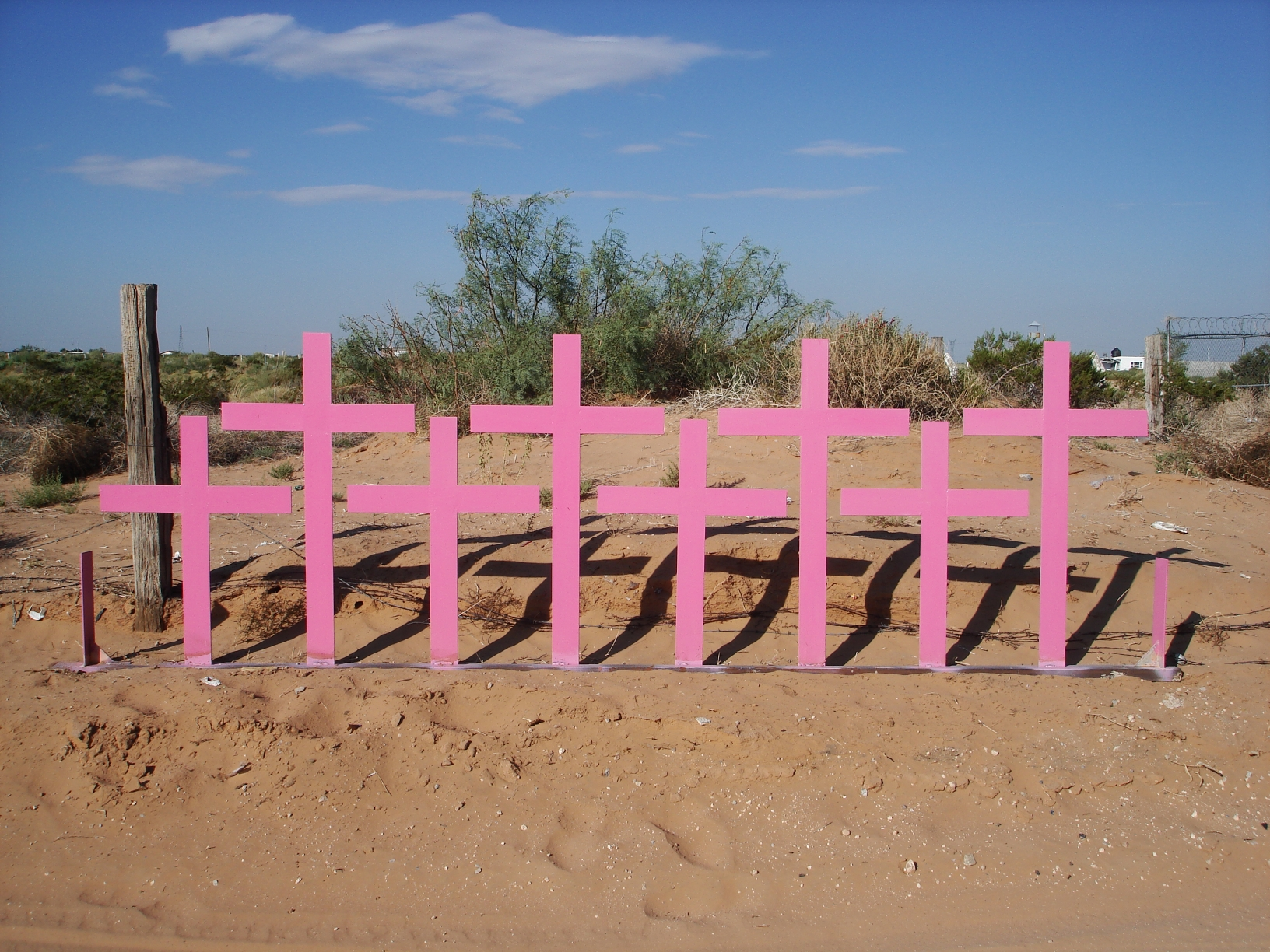
- Crosses erected where the corpses of eight women were found in 1996
- Native name: Feminicidios en Ciudad Juárez
- Duration: 1993–2011
- Location: Ciudad Juárez, Chihuahua
- Cause: Robbery, gang wars, rape, serial murders
- Casualties: 370+

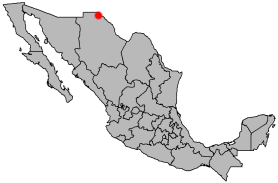
The location of Ciudad Juárez

More than 500 women were killed between 1993 and 2011 in Ciudad Juárez, a city in northern Mexico. The murders of women and girls received international attention primarily due to perceived government inaction in preventing the violence and bringing perpetrators to justice. A narcofosa (mass grave attributed to organized crime) containing the remains of women killed in 2011 and 2012 was found in Madera Municipality, Chihuahua, in December 2016.

== Homicide statistics ==
In 2005, Amnesty International said that more than 370 young women and girls had been killed in the cities of Ciudad Juárez and Chihuahua since 1993. In August 2011, it was reported that 130 killings occurred in Ciudad Juárez since January of that year.

In 2008, a study was conducted at the Colegio de la Frontera Norte on the Femicide Database 1993–2007, which documented incidents of femicide that occurred in Ciudad Juárez from 1993 to 2010. The study found two common patterns in the data: intimate femicide and systemic sexual femicide. Men killing women that were close to them is intimate femicide. The study found intimate femicide accounted for 30.4% of the murders of women and girls in Juárez from 1993 to 2007. Systematic sexual femicide refers to systematic patterns in the killing of women and children, including kidnapping, sexual violence, torture, and body abandonment in areas such as the desert, garbage dumps, and sewage ditches, among others.

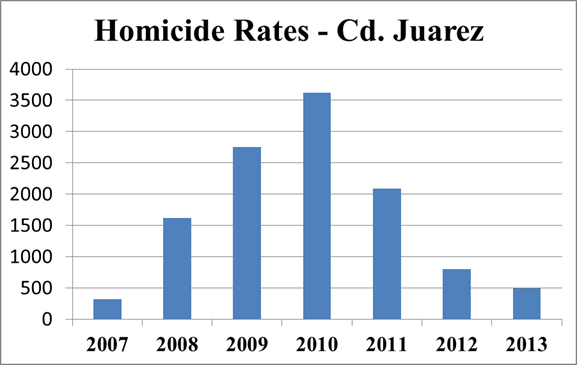
Total number of homicides in Juárez

According to Molly Molloy, a former librarian at New Mexico State University, the situation in Juárez is one of "impunity regardless of gender". She states that "female murder victims have never comprised more than 18 percent of the overall number of murder victims in Ciudad Juárez, and in the last two decades that figure averages at less than 10 percent. That's less than in the United States, where about 20 to 25 percent of the people who are murdered in a given year are women".

Statistical evaluation of data from 1990 to 2012 by French and American researchers shows that femicide rates in Juárez are similar to Chihuahua City and Ensenada most years, and, as a share of overall homicide rates, are lower than in most cities evaluated.

== Contributing factors ==
=== Organized crime and drug trafficking ===
Drug cartels operate in Juárez, which has resulted in high levels of violence against the local population, including women and girls. Misogyny is a common trait of gang activity. According to a study conducted in 2008, 9.1% of the murders of women were attributed to organized crime and drug trafficking activities.

=== Maquila industry ===
Maquiladoras are widely known for their cheap labor and their exploitative conditions, such as regularly violating basic human rights, that often target women. Women and girls often migrate from villages or rural areas in other parts of Mexico in search of work in the maquilas. According to Livingston, this migration of women created, "a new phenomenon of mobile, independent, and vulnerable working women," in cities like Ciudad Juárez. Many of the murder victims in Ciudad Juárez have been maquiladora employees. Despite the expansion of the maquila industry, Juárez remained a relatively poor and undeveloped city lacking infrastructure in some parts, such as electricity and paved roads. As a part of their daily commute, many women maquila workers walk through such areas to and from company buses, creating vulnerability to be victimized. In addition, the increased involvement of women in the labor force may also be a contributing factor to the victimization of women and girls because of the competition for economic resources in decades in which male unemployment has been high.

=== NAFTA ===
The implementation of the North American Free Trade Agreement in 1994 expanded the maquiladora industry and created employment opportunities for women outside of the home and in the factories. The availability of cheap labor made it attractive for business owners to open factories in Mexico, and the new jobs attracted many, especially women, to border towns such as Ciudad Juárez. Research has shown correlations between economic and political issues and violence against women along the border.

Academic Katherine Pantaleo has argued that "NAFTA, as a capitalist approach, has directly created a devaluation of women and an increase in gendered violence." Further, according to Wright, in the time period between the implementation of NAFTA in 1994 and 2001, "the homicide rate for men increased by 300 percent, while for women it increased by 600 percent." Such studies indicate the importance of exploring the effects of NAFTA when considering the possible causes of the murder of women and girls in Ciudad Juárez. Consequently, it has been suggested that amendments be made to NAFTA that include human rights provisions.

=== Gender roles ===
Sociocultural attitudes to traditional gender roles have influenced violence against women. According to Pantaleo, "Under the view of patriarchy, two expressions are commonly used in Mexico to show the difference in the status of males and females; these expressions are machismo and marianismo." Machismo is characterized by male power and aggression; while marianismo is characterized by subordination and domestic duties. Women who leave their homes to seek employment in the maquila industry directly challenge the marianismo. Olivera suggests that this changed situation challenges hypermasculinity. According to Livingston, gender-directed violence in Ciudad Juárez may be a negative reaction as women "gain greater personal autonomy and independence while men lose ground."

== Police and governmental response ==
The murder of women in Juárez has attracted global attention since 1993, given suspected police and government inaction to prevent the murders and bring perpetrators to justice. Police and government officials have been accused of responding with indifference to the crimes against women as well as exhibiting tolerance for such crimes, conducting inadequate and negligent investigations, ineffectively responding to the crimes, and failing to prevent and protect women from violence. According to Livingston, "In 1998 the National Commission for Human Rights issued a report charging gross irregularities and general negligence in state investigations, including the misidentification of corpses, failure to obtain expert tests on forensic evidence, failure to conduct autopsies or obtain semen analysis... failure to file written reports, [and] incompetence in keeping records of the rising tide of women murders."

As a result of international attention, police and government officials have been politically pressured to respond to the murders. In 2011, Amnesty International said, "The government [has] failed to take effective measures to investigate and bring to justice those responsible for the abduction and killing of three women in Ciudad Juárez... or to combat the ongoing pattern of violence against women and discrimination in the city.

=== Convictions ===
According to Pantaleo in 2006, "While around 400 girls and women have been abducted and murdered, few arrests and convictions have resulted." For convictions that have been made, there is a great deal of controversy that surrounds them. Police have been accused of conducting rushed investigations with questionable methodology and integrity. Further, suspects that have been apprehended have claimed that they were tortured into confessing. This has caused uncertainty about the legitimacy of both investigations and convictions.

In 1996, an Egyptian, Abdul Latif Sharif, was convicted of 3 murders and sentenced to a 30-year prison term. After his arrest in 1995, the murders continued, and authorities claimed that Sharif directed members of the "Los Rebeldes" gang to continue the murders while he was incarcerated. These members were indicted and convicted as a result of this connection. The gang members accused of carrying out murders under Sharif's orders claimed they were tortured while in police custody. According to Fragoso, "In the year 2000, it was known that the body of Elizabeth Castro Garcia, whose murder was attributed to Omar Sharif Latif, does not belong to her."

In 2001, Victor Garcia Uribe and Gustavo Gonzalez Meza were apprehended for eight murders. Gustavo Gonzalez Mesa died suspiciously while in police custody. In 2004, Victor Garcia Uribe, a bus driver, was convicted of eight murders that took place in 2001. He confessed to these murders, but claimed that he was tortured into confessing by police. On 15 July 2005, García Uribe was freed due to the lack of evidence about his participation in the murders.

In 2008, 16-year-old Ruby Frayre Escobedo was murdered by Sergio Barraza Bocanegra, who was acquitted at his first trial for lack of evidence. Following two years of activism, a retrial convicted Bocanegra, who remained on the run. In 2010, Ruby's mother, Marisela Escobedo Ortiz, was assassinated by a shot to the head at point blank range while demonstrating for justice in front of the Governor's Palace in Chihuahua.

== International justice ==
There have been several international rulings against Mexico for its inadequate response to the increasing violence against women. In 2004, under the Optional Protocol to the Convention on the Elimination of All Forms of Discrimination against Women (CEDAW) conducted an inquiry into the allegations that hundreds of murders of women and girls had taken place in the area of Ciudad Juarez since 1993 at the urging of several NGOs. For the inquiry to take place, it was required that there was reliable evidence that showed that Mexico violated rights established by CEDAW. The Committee analyzed the gender-based crimes occurring in Ciudad Juárez and found the two common forms were murder and disappearances. The committee also analyzed the government's response and found that the initial response was indifferent and that the government tolerated these crimes for years.

Further, the Committee concluded that the measures undertaken by the Mexican government in response to men's violence against women leading up to the time of their inquiry were "few and ineffective at all levels of the State". The Committee made several recommendations for Mexico. Although these recommendations were not legally binding, they were influential in the public sphere.

According to Amnesty International, "In [2009], the Inter-American Court of Human Rights ruled on the "cotton field" (Campo Algodonero) case that Mexico was guilty of discrimination and of failing to protect three young women murdered in 2001 in Ciudad Juárez or to ensure an effective investigation into their abduction and murder." The Court ordered Mexico to conduct a new investigation of the murders, create a national memorial for the victims, pay reparations to the families of the victims, and to improve measures which prevent and adequately investigate the murder of women and girls.

== Local activism ==
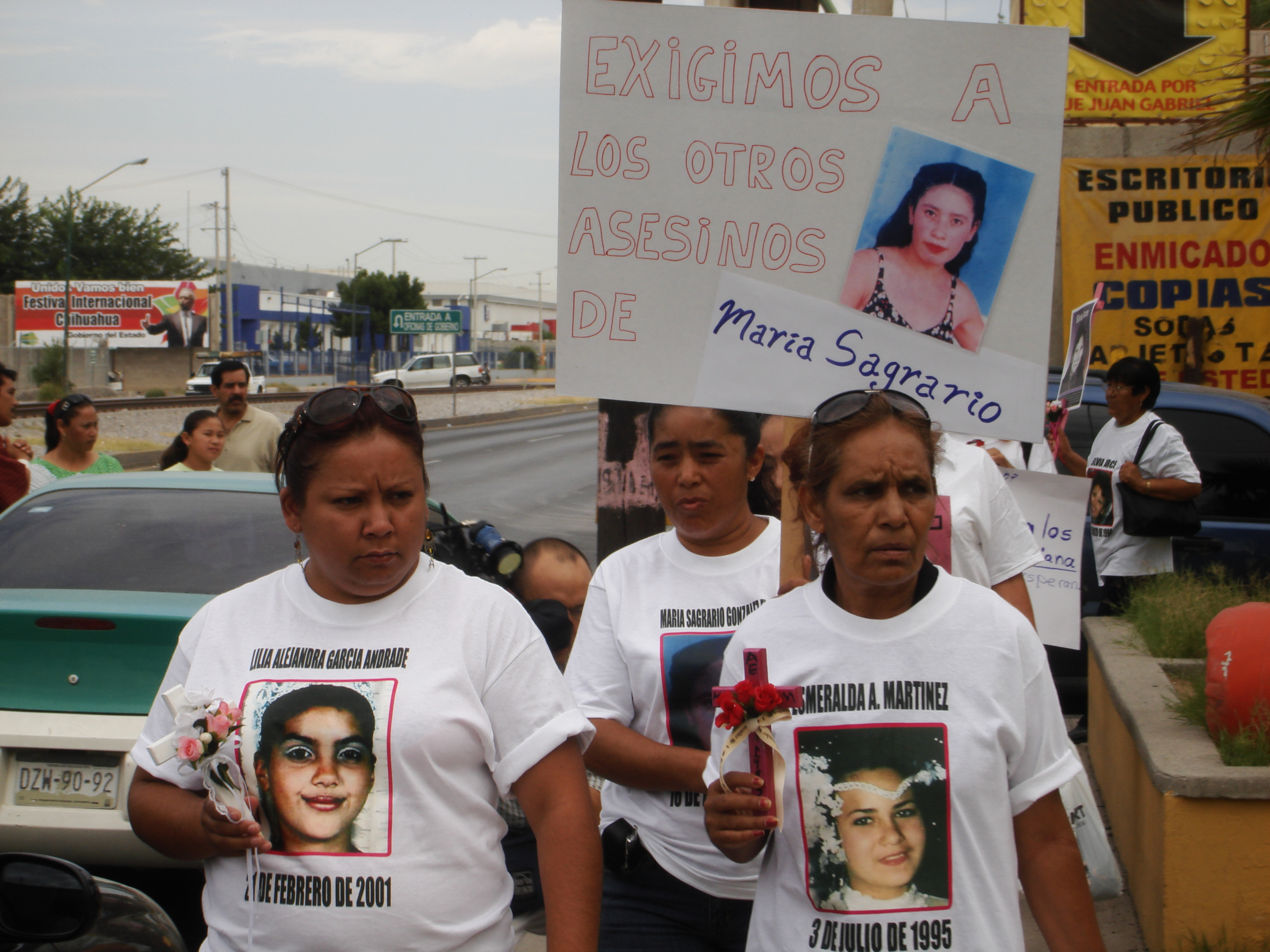
2007 protest by victims' families demanding justice

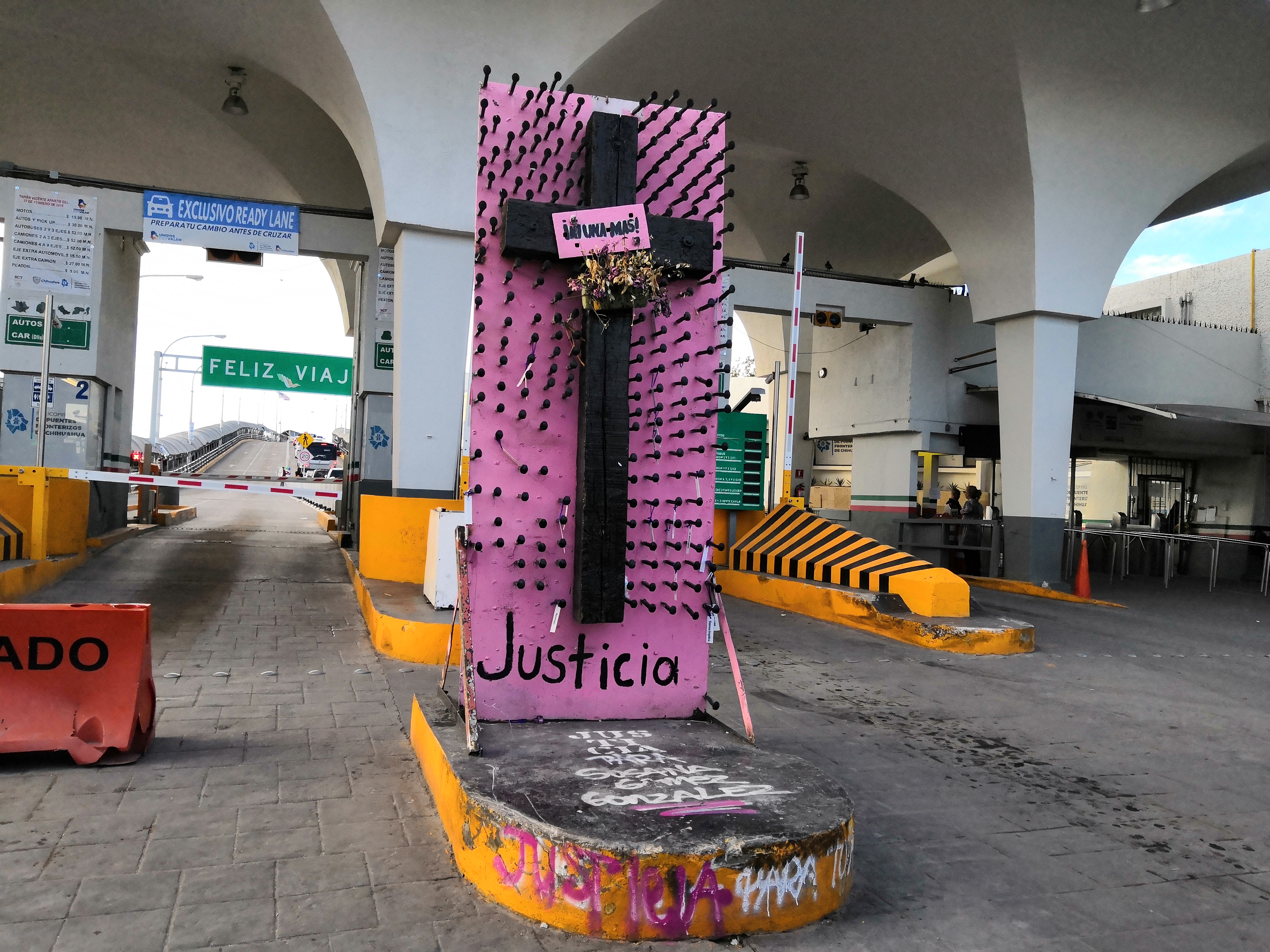
A Cruz de Clavos installed at the El Paso PDN Port of Entry in Juárez

There have been numerous local efforts that have helped draw attention to the femicides in Juárez. In 1999, a group of feminist activists founded Casa Amiga, Juárez's first rape crisis and sexual assault center. The center works to provide women in Juárez with a refuge against violence, therapy, legal council, and medical attention. In 2002, a social justice movement named Ni Una Más (Spanish: "not one more") was formed to raise international awareness of men's violence against women in Juárez. The movement consists of a variety of domestic and international organizations and individual activists.

Ni Una Más participants demand that the Mexican state implement strategies that prevent men's violence against women, including murder and kidnappings, and that the state conduct competent investigations on crimes already committed. Nuestras Hijas de Regreso a Casa A.C. (Spanish: "Our Daughters Back Home") also formed in response to the men's violence against women in Juárez. Nuestras Hijas de Regreso a Casa A.C. has also worked to bring domestic and international media attention to men's violence against women in Juárez.

== Cultural references ==
=== In art ===
In 2009 Elina Chauvet created "Red Shoes" and this consisted of 33 pairs of empty red shoes laid out in the town on the road that led to the United States border. The work has been recreated in other countries. That work was recreated over 80 times in different countries.

=== In television and radio ===
- American television series The Bridge (2013)
- This American Life (Public Radio Exchange), Episode 506 - Secret Identity, Act Three: The Blonde Avenger
- Netflix series Narcos: Mexico Season 3

=== In film ===
- Blood Rising (2013) directed by Mark McLoughlin
- Backyard: El Traspatio (2009) directed by Carlos Carrera
- Bordertown (2007) starring Jennifer Lopez and Antonio Banderas
- Señorita Extraviada/Missing Young Woman (2001) by Lourdes Portillo
- Documentary Equal Means Equal (2016) directed by Kamala Lopez
- Bajo Juárez: La Ciudad Devorando a Sus Hijas (2006) directed by José Antonio Cordero and Alejandra Sánchez
- Las tres muertes de Marisela Escobedo (2020) directed by Carlos Pérez Osorio

=== In music ===
- Tori Amos wrote a song titled "Juárez" for her album To Venus and Back (1999–2000)
- At the Drive-In's song "Invalid Litter Dept." (2001)
- Los Tigres del Norte's song "Mujeres de Juárez" from their album Pacto De Sangre (2004)
- Gloria Trevi's song "Inmaculada" from her album Una Rosa Blu (2007)
- The Misfits wrote a song about Juárez titled "Where Do They Go?" for their album The Devil's Rain (2011)
- Las Cafeteras's song "Mujer Soy" from their album It's Time (2012)
- The World Is a Beautiful Place & I Am No Longer Afraid to Die's song "January 10th, 2014" from the album Harmlessness (2015)
- Intocable's song "Día 730" (2016)
- Sheer Mag's song "Can't Stop Fighting" from their third EP (2016)
- Misty L. Dupuis wrote a choral work called Mujeres de Juárez (Premiere: May 6, 2018)

=== Novels, poetry, non-fiction, plays ===
- Sergio González Rodríguez. Huesos en el desierto (Bones in the Desert). Editorial Anagrama, 2002. (book, nonfiction)
- Roberto Bolaño. 2666. 2004. (novel)
- Alicia Gaspar de Alba. Desert Blood: The Juarez Murders Arte Publico Press, 2005. (mystery novel)
- Diana Washington Valdez. The Killing Fields: Harvest of Women. 2006 (book, non-fiction)
- Juan Felipe Herrera. Señorita X - Song for the Yellow-Robed Girl from Juárez. 2007 (poems)
- Teresa Rodríguez.The Daughters of Juárez: A True Story of Serial Murder South of the Border. 2007 (book)
- Stella Pope Duarte. If I Die In Juárez. 2008 (novel)
- Valerie Martinez. Each and Her. 2010 (poems)
- Charles Bowden. Murder City: Cuidad Juárez and the Global Economy's New Killing Fields. 2011. (book)
- Nancy Pineda-Madrid. Suffering and Salvation in Ciudad Juarez. 2011 (book, non-fiction)
- Sergio González Rodríguez. The Femicide Machine. Semiotext(e) Intervention Series, 2012 (book, nonfiction)
- Isaac Gomez. The Way She Spoke. 2019 (play)
- Caridad Svich. Iphigenia Crash Land Falls on the Neon Shell That Was Once Her Heart (a rave fable). 2019 (play)
- Eve Ensler. Vagina Monologues (play) {verification needed for this 1996 play as reference to Juarez events – predates any evidence of reporting}
- Reid Winslow The Dead Bell 2021 (novel)

=== Articles ===
- Debbie Nathan, "Death Comes to the Maquilas: a Border Story," The Nation. January 13, 1997
- Howard LaFranchi, "Girls Who Find New Roles in Mexico Also Face Danger," The Christian Science Monitor. June 4, 1997
- Sam Dillon, "Rape and Murder Stalk Women in Northern Mexico," The New York Times. April 18, 1998
- Ricardo Sandoval, "Serial Killings Haunting Mexico; 120 Young Women Slain Since 1993," Times-Picayune. November 21, 1998
- Paul de la Garza. "Series of Slayings Baffles City on Mexican Border," Arizona Republic. November 27, 1998
- Sam Dillon, "Feminist stokes outcry at brutal string of killings," The Gazette (Montreal). March 1, 1999
- Mary Beth Sheridan. "The Death that Haunts Juárez," Los Angeles Times. May 12, 1999
- Molly Moore."Young Women Follow Journeys of Hope to Factories-and Then to Violence; Bright Lights, Dark City," The Washington Post. June 25, 2000
- "Murders of 'Invisible Women' Grow at Mexican Border," New Zealand Press Association. March 5, 2002
- Ellen Nieves. "To Work and Die in Juárez." Mother Jones (magazine). May/June 2002
- Ed Vulliamy, "Murder in Mexico." The Guardian. 8 Mar, 2003
- Jessica Livingston. "Murder in Juárez: Gender, Sexual Violence, and the Global Assembly Line," Frontiers: A Journal of Women Studies. Vol. 25, No. 1, 2004

== See also ==
- Femicide in Latin America
- Missing and Murdered Indigenous Women
- Violence against women in the United States
- Human rights in Mexico
- List of unsolved murders (1980–1999)
- Not My Fault: Mexico
- Women in Mexico
