= The Golden Calf (1968 film) =

- Film poster
- Directed by: Mikhail Schweitzer
- Written by: Mikhail Schweitzer
- Based on: The Little Golden Calf by Ilf and Petrov
- Starring: Sergei Yursky; Leonid Kuravlyov; Zinovy Gerdt; Yevgeny Yevstigneyev
- Cinematography: Sergei Poluyanov
- Music by: Georgy Firtich
- Production company: Mosfilm
- Release date: December 8, 1968
- Running time: 164 minutes
- Country: Soviet Union
- Language: Russian

The Golden Calf (Russian: Золотой телёнок, romanized: Zolotoy telyonok) is a 1968 Soviet comedy film directed by Mikhail Schweitzer, based on the eponymous novel by Ilf and Petrov. The title of the film and the novel alludes to the "golden calf" of the Bible.

== Plot ==
=== Part 1 ===
It is the 1920s in the Soviet Union, and master swindler Ostap Bender dreams of moving to Rio de Janeiro, for which he would need at least 500,000 rubles. However, for now, he is penniless and stranded in Arbatov, a small town.

He visits the local government official to finagle 50 rubles out of him by posing as a son of revolutionary hero Lieutenant Schmidt and claiming he is on a trip and a mishap has left him out of money. The official is honored at the idea of helping the progeny of such a great hero. However, the meeting is then interrupted when a young man barges in and states he is the son of Lieutenant Schmidt. While the official is perplexed, Bender quickly assesses the youngster as an impostor and makes a show of treating him as his long-lost brother to defuse the situation. The youngster enthusiastically joins in upon understanding the quandary he got into.

After the meeting is over and the money secured, the two impostors get further acquainted. The youngster turns out to be Shura Balaganov, a crude petty criminal and ex-convict. Shura quickly becomes awed by Bender's sophisticated demeanor and creative thinking. Bender reveals his dream of moving to Rio to Shura, and his need for wealthy people to swindle so he can finance it. In turn, Shura states he knows of an underground millionaire living in the fictional Black Sea coastal city of Chernomorsk: Alexander Koreiko.

During his exchange with Bender, Shura spots Panikovsky, a cantankerous old crook who also makes his living as a "son of Lieutenant Schmidt" and has been infringing on the young man's exclusive territory. Panikovsky pays a visit to the same official fooled earlier by Bender and Shura, and is unceremoniously thrown out.

Bender convinces idealist taxi driver Kozlevich to drive Shura and him to Chernomorsk. On their way out of Arbatov, they run into Panikovsky again, this time chased by an angry mob for stealing a goose. Bender decides to take him onboard. On the road, the quartet manages to obtain free food and fuel along part of the trip, thanks to Bender's idea of pretending to be the lead car in the ongoing Moscow-Kharkov-Moscow rally.

Meanwhile, in Chernomorsk, Alexander Koreiko goes about his life, unaware of the approaching danger. He is an unassuming-looking, middle-aged accountant but keeps an impressive stash of money hidden in a suitcase left in storage. He is also single and tries to convince 20 year-old Zosya Sinitskaya to marry him. She refuses due to their age difference and his low official salary of 46 rubles, ignorant of his real wealth.

Once in Chernomosrk, Bender starts a psychological warfare campaign against Koreiko by ensuring references to millions and millionaires keep popping up around him. He thus hopes to weaken his prey and prepare him to voluntarily part with some of his money. He then tasks Shura and Panikovsky with stealing Koreiko's wallet. Said wallet turns out to contain 10,500 rubles, about 20 years worth of Koreiko's official salary. Shura and Panikovsky want to split this loot, but Bender intends to return it to Koreiko and thus trick him into openly admitting his millionaire status. Bender, disguised as a policeman, shows up at Koreiko's home to return the wallet and make him sign a release form. However, Koreiko evades Bender's trap by denying the wallet and the large amount of money inside are his. Bender leaves defeated but decides an investigation into Koreiko's past activities is needed to collect blackmail material.

=== Part 2 ===
Using the money stolen from Koreiko, Bender has set up a front business, the Office for Collection of Horns and Hooves, with Panikovsky and Shura as fellow employees. The company is supposed to supply raw materials for combs and buttons but serves as a cover while Bender goes on various trips to carry out a detailed investigation of Koreiko's past. The three crooks are joined by Funt, an old man who's spent his whole adult life being the nominal director in dubious enterprises and going to jail when the inevitable bankruptcies followed. Funt provides some information regarding Hercules, a company involved in fraud that had come to Bender's attention.

Eventually, Bender accumulates a voluminous dossier implicating Koreiko in black market trafficking of medicine and food during disease outbreaks and food shortages, as well as in the fraudulent bankruptcy of the Hercules company. Bender pays a visit to Koreiko and offers to sell him the dossier for one million rubles, under threat of bringing it to the authorities in case of refusal. Koreiko manages to flee and leave Chernomorsk without leaving any trail.

To compound matters, the money stolen from Koreiko runs out. Before Bender can sell the office equipment and supplies to raise funds, the company is raided by authorities for having appropriated negligible quantities of hooves and horns, and Funt is hauled off to jail once again. Bender invests his last few rubles into a flower bouquet for Zosya, whom he had started courting following Koreiko's flight. The investment pays off when Zosya tells him she's received a letter from Koreiko detailing his whereabouts: he is now working as a time controller on the Turkestan-Siberia Railway.

Bender and his three acolytes set off after Koreiko again. However, on the third day of driving, Kozlevich's car runs off the road and falls apart. The passengers are unhurt and continue on foot, but Panikovsky later dies of a heart attack. After burying and eulogizing him, the three survivors decide to split up: Shura and Kozlevich have lost faith and turn back West, while Bender continues East alone.

Eventually, Bender finds Koreiko in Turkestan and succeeds in selling his dossier for a million rubles. Arriving in Moscow by train, he is surprised to find Shura sleeping on a bench at the station. He treats the young man to lunch, gives him 50,000 rubles and promises to send him to school so he can learn to read and write. While they take the tram to go to Bender's hotel, Shura absent-mindedly steals a woman's purse out of habit and ends up being arrested.

Bender goes on to Chernomorsk alone. There, he meets up with Kozlevich, who had put his car back together, and provides him with spare parts. He confesses to being disillusioned with his newfound wealth, as the soviet system places limits on how he can spend it. Furthermore, he feels a void due to his lack of a love life and had repeatedly sent telegrams to Zosya without getting any response from her. Eventually, he runs into Zosya and offers to marry her, only to discover she's already gotten married recently.

In a moment of weakness, Bender almost anonymously mails the money to the finance ministry before changing his mind. Reverting to his original plan of moving to Rio de Janeiro, he tries to sneak out of the country in the dead of winter loaded with furs and jewelry, only to have border guards seize everything from him.

== Cast ==
- Sergei Yursky as Ostap Bender
- Leonid Kuravlyov as Shura Balaganov
- Zinovy Gerdt as Mikhail Samuelevich Panikovsky
- Yevgeny Yevstigneyev as Koreiko
- Svetlana Starikova as Zosya Sinitskaya
- Nikolai Boyarsky as Adam Kozlevich
- Igor Yasulovich as young driver
- Nikolai Sergeyev as old man Sinitsky, Zosya's grandfather
- Tamara Syomina as Rayechka
- Pavel Pavlenko as Chairman Funt
- Igor Kashintsev as servant Bomze (uncredited)
- Mikhail Kokshenov as the secretary (uncredited)
