= Ostap Bender =

Fictional con man from Ilya Ilf and Yevgeni Petrov's novels

Ostap Bender as portrayed by Andrei Mironov, 1976

Ostap Bender (Russian: Остап Бендер) is a fictional con man and the central antiheroic protagonist in the novels The Twelve Chairs (1928) and The Little Golden Calf (1931) written by Soviet authors Ilya Ilf and Yevgeny Petrov. The novels belong to the picaresque novel genre, which was previously rare in Russian literature. In The Twelve Chairs he called himself Ostap-Suleyman-Berta-Maria-Bender-Bey, in The Little Golden Calf he called himself Bender-Zadunaysky, and he was called Ostap Ibragimovich by one of his companions.

Bender is an attractive, resourceful crook, full of energy while operating within the law ("Bender knew 400 relatively legal ways to make the population part with their money."); his description as "The Great Combinator" became a catchphrase in the Russian language.

His exploits have been enjoyed by readers throughout the Soviet times and in modern Russia. In post-Soviet times Bender's character was elevated from the status of a con man to that of an entrepreneur. His statues may be found in several cities, and a commemorative plaque was set in Odesa, the city of his birth.

== Appearances ==
The Twelve Chairs was released in January 1928.

In the first novel, Ostap Bender searches for a stash of diamonds hidden in one of the twelve eponymous chairs. The action takes place in the Soviet Union in 1927 during the New Economic Policy era. At the end of the novel, Bender is killed by his partner, Ippolit Matveyevich Vorobyaninov, who does not want to share the treasure when it seems like they are about to reach their goal.

In the second novel, The Little Golden Calf, published in 1931, Bender is alive, he says, because "surgeons barely saved my life", Ilf and Petrov having conjured the character's death away retroactively. This book provided an extended satire on certain elements of Soviet life. Here, Bender follows Soviet underground multi-millionaire Koreiko, hoping to acquire some of his riches and thus amass a fortune. Bender gets his money, but soon discovers he cannot spend it in the USSR. He proceeds to lose it as he attempts to flee the country by crossing the border into Romania.

Film-makers have produced a number of screen adaptations of the novels; see The Twelve Chairs adaptations and The Little Golden Calf adaptations. Over the years, the part was played on screen by Frank Langella (The Twelve Chairs (1970 film)), Archil Gomiashvili (The Twelve Chairs (1971 film)), Andrei Mironov (actor) (The Twelve Chairs (1976 film)), Sergei Yursky (The Golden Calf (1968 film)), Oleg Menshikov (The Little Golden Calf, 2006), etc.

== Character ==
Ostap Bender's origins are mysterious; he mentions only that his father was "a Turkish subject", his mother was "a Countess and received unearned income" and that his full name is Ostap-Suleyman-Berta-Maria-Bender-Bey (Остап-Сулейман-Берта-Мария-Бендер-Бей). In the comments to the Complete Works of Ilf and Petrov by M. Odessky and D. Feldman, this phrase is explained as a hint to his supposed Jewish origin from a port city in Novorossiya, most probably Odesa, where many Jews claimed Turkish citizenship to evade discrimination and conscription for military service. Some of them indeed held Turkish citizenship, such as Julius Martov.

In The Little Golden Calf, Ostap Bender is also called "Бендер-Задунайский" ("Bender-Zadunaisky", literally: "Bender-Trans-Danubian") and "Остап Ибрагимович" (Ostap Ibragimovich, where "Ibragimovich" is a patronymic, literally meaning "son of Ibrahim"). The city of Bender and the Danube river are historically and geographically close to both the large regional city of Odesa and the former Ottoman (Turkish) Empire.

Bender dreams of travelling to Rio de Janeiro, "the city of his dreams", while admitting the futility of that obsession.

There were a number of possible prototypes for Bender, most famously Ostap (Osip) Shor (1899–1978), a friend of the authors who spent his youth in Odesa gaining money as a con man and then—as a Cheka inspector. He was a good story-teller, and many of his tales inspired the adventures of Ostap Bender. Valentin Kataev who came up with the idea for the novel (which, in turn, is dedicated to him) is named as another prototype; he also led an adventurous life and was known as a literary hoaxer, adding many original touches to the biography of Osip Shor whom he saw as fitting the readers' expectations of a "real-life combinator".

Another suggested influence was the character of Alexander Ametistov from Mikhail Bulgakov's play Zoyka's Flat that had been written and staged in 1926, before the work on The Twelve Chairs was even started. Also an elegant con man with many names and occupations, he is seen as a direct inspiration by a number of modern researches, to the point that some of them believe that both novels were ghostwritten by Bulgakov.

=== Bender's leadership ===
The entrepreneurial abilities of Bender attracted attention of researchers in management. Parallels have been drawn of Bender's schemes with failures of businesses in early post-Soviet Russia, a period compared to that of NEP when Bender operated. Bender is educated and has an analytical mind; is full of energy; in the case of a failure keeps his optimism and has an ability to reassess the situation; has an empathy towards his subordinates, opponents and "marks"; has exceptional organizational skills, even when limited by scarce resources.

While Bender is endowed with many traits of a charismatic leader, it was concluded that the major reason of his failures was lack of clear understanding of his own goals and needs, and short-term perspective. A serious drawback of Bender as a leader is his paternalism. Also, while he is aware of the drawbacks of his companions, he puts no efforts into their betterment. While at times he can be a motivational speaker, he did not care about the long-term motivation of his subordinates; instead, he preferred to manipulate or simply force them.

== Cultural influence ==
A chapter in The Little Golden Calf was called "The Great Combinator" ("Великий комбинатор", "The Great Schemer"). It was one of the choices for the title of the book. Since then the expression "the great combinator" came to refer in Russian culture either a con man or to an enterprising person.

One of the attractions of Bender is the witty language of the novels which produced numerous catchphrases:

- "Maybe I should also give you the key to the flat where I keep my money?" ("Может быть, тебе дать ещё ключ от квартиры, где деньги лежат?") – it became a cliche rebuke to unreasonable requests.
- "Stay strong. The West will help us." ("Крепитесь. Запад нам поможет.") – now an ironical hint that a situation is hopeless. With the collapse of the Soviet Union, the ironical meaning has become nearly literal.
- "Money in the morning, chairs in the evening." ("Утром деньги, вечером стулья.") – now a jocular hint to payment in advance.
- "The task of helping the drowning people is in the hands of the drowning people themselves." ("Спасение утопающих — дело рук самих утопающих".) – "not our business" Notably, this quote was cited in the situation when Russia was trying to attract foreign investors, while Russia's own capital was fleeing the country.
- "The ice has broken, ladies and gentlemen of the jury!" ("Лёд тронулся, господа присяжные заседатели!") – said to declare the onset of a progress in something after a period of deadlock, uncertainty, or stagnation.
- To cover up his activities, Bender created the fake office named Horns and Hooves ("Рога и копыта"). This name in Russian is used to describe shell companies and other small dubious organizations.

== See also ==
- Children of Lieutenant Schmidt
