= Solomon Trone =

Russian-American engineer

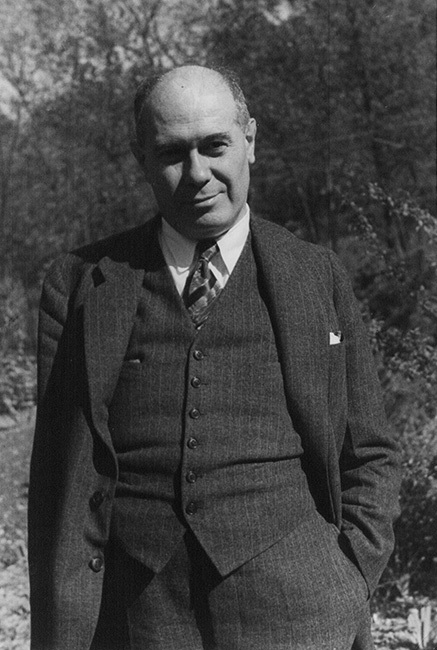
Trone in the mid-1930s, photographed by Ilya Ilf.

Solomon Abramovich Trone (Russian Соломон Абрамович Трон May 11 [May 23], 1872, Jelgava, Courland Province, Russian Empire – 1969, Italy) was a Russian and American engineer who made an important contribution to the electrification of the Soviet Union, and acted as an industrial advisor to Israel, China and India through his work in industrial planning. Featured as a central character in the book by Ilf and Petrov One-storied America under the name of Mr. Adams.

== Biography ==
Solomon, or Zalman-Peisach Trone, was born in Mitava (now Jelgava, Latvia) to Abram Trone and Esther Levi, the daughter of a rabbi. He worked in the St. Petersburg branch of the company "General Electric" – "Russian Society of the General Electric Company". He was engaged in projects to create hydroelectric power plants. After witnessing the events of Bloody Sunday 1905 he adopted more radical views. In 1906 he became a full member of the Russian Technical Society in the VI (electrical) department.

He was the manager of the Vladivostok branch of the Russian branch of the General Electricity Company (General Electric). He was a member of the Society for the Study of the Amur Territory and was vice-chairman of its committee, which was engaged in the publication of a geological map of the region (authored by P. V. Wittenburg) and the presentation of competitive awards to researchers.

In 1916, in connection with the World War I, and the nationalization of the General Electric company's Russian property, he emigrated to the United States with his wife and son Dmitry. In the United States Trone became a close friend of the inventor and engineer Charles Proteus Steinmetz, with whom he shared technocratic and political ideals. Later, in St. Petersburg in 1917, Trone was able to open negotiations that eventually developed into contracts between General Electric and the later Soviet Governments. Further evidence suggests negotiations assisted by Trone took place with the Bolsheviks, as well as other revolutionary groups, prior to the October Revolution. Documentation at the St. Petersburg Historical Archive reference Trone regularly in correspondence with the government before and after the October Revolution and the following year 1918.

Trone also took part in the events of the February Revolution as an ambulance driver. As formerly active in Russian radical politics, Trone had met with many of the leading participants and facilitated GE's negotiations with the Provisional Government.

He continued his career in General Electric and became one of the directors of its subsidiary International General Electric Company (I.G.E.). In 1928, Trone persuaded the board of the parent company to conclude a contract with the Soviet Union, signed by him, Owen D. Young and the head of the IGE, Charles H. Minor.

This agreement not only played a major role in the implementation of the GOELRO electrification plan, but also may have contributed to the recognition of the Soviet Union by the United States.

Trone spent some time in the Soviet Union for business but lived in Schenectady, in the state of New York, which he considered to be his main place of residence. In 1931, Trone became a U.S. citizen. Shortly after this Trone retired from General Electric. Between 1935 and 1936 Trone gave a tour of the United States to the Soviet writers Ilf and Petrov. Trone's dialogue and his activities while giving the tour to the writers became a major component of the book in the fictional character of Mr. Adams in the novel One-storied America.

In 1940, the Joint Distribution Committee, an American Jewish charity for refugees sent Trone to visit France, Germany, Holland, Belgium, Luxembourg, Switzerland and Portugal in search of Jewish refugees in transit and concentration camps. He was to select participants for the Sosua agricultural project that had been the result of the Évian Conference concerning the plight of Jewish refugees.

In the 1940s Trone was, for various periods of time, an advisor on Industrial planning in India and China. The Kuomintang government in China hired Trone to work as an advisor on development to the Bank of China in 1943. Significantly, Trone was able to advise on the development of the island of Taiwan into an independent industrial economy. In India in 1949, Trone was reporting directly to Prime Minister Nehru on his survey of India and the possibilities of development

In 1952, Trone, at the invitation of Hillel Dan, head of the construction company Solel Bone, closely associated with the Histadrut, developed a ten-year plan for the development of reparations from Germany. Despite Dan's efforts, the Israeli government never approved Trone's plan. In June 1953, at a budget debate in the Knesset, Ben-Gurion reproached Trone and other invited foreign experts for the absence of a "Zionist spark".

In 1953, while in London, England, Trone failed to obtain an American passport to replace the expired one. This may have been due to Trone being accused but never charged or convicted of espionage for the Soviet Union and prior to that the Russian Empire. In 1965 Trone's passport was reinstated, although he spent the rest of his life mainly in London.
