= Children of Lieutenant Schmidt =

The Children of Lieutenant Schmidt (Russian: Дети лейтенанта Шмидта), a fictional society of swindlers, appeared in the 1931 satirical novel The Little Golden Calf by Ilf and Petrov. They pose as children of Lieutenant Schmidt, a hero of the Russian Revolution of 1905. The main antihero of the novel, Ostap Bender, makes two hapless members of this society his sidekicks.

The novel is set in the Soviet Union (Russia, Ukraine and Turkestan) in the 1920s, and its premise is that at the time, numerous fake relatives of Karl Marx, Prince Kropotkin, and other revolutionary figures roam the country, tricking gullible Soviet officials into sponsoring them. Their numbers grow, and to prevent any unlucky chance of spoiling each other's attempts, they "unionize", with Schmidt's Children being the most difficult to organize. When the latter finally convene, "it turned out that Lieutenant Schmidt had thirty sons, from eighteen to fifty-two years in age, and four daughters, unattractive, and no longer young". They split Russia into 34 territories.

Ostap Bender, being in difficult straits, decides to play the same game, but runs into another trickster (Shura Balaganov, who becomes his accomplice) right in front of a bureaucrat in a Soviet office. Bender manages to get out of the gaffe by emotionally greeting Shura as a long-lost brother. Later they meet yet another "sibling" – Mikhail Panikovsky (Russian: Михаил Самуэлевич Паниковский), who is running for his life (he had ignored the convention, trespassed, and was caught red-handed by victims of yet another "brother").

== Heritage ==
Since then, the expression "Children of Lieutenant Schmidt" has become a Russian cliché for various fraudulent enterprises and people who use false pretenses to get money, such as claiming to be a war veteran, a "Chernobyl liquidator", or a relative of the victim.

A music band from Minsk, Belarus, and the KVN team from Tomsk bear the name.

A monument to two of the most famous of Schmidt's "sons" (Bender and Balaganov) was erected in Berdiansk in 2002. A statue of Panikovsky, carrying out his favorite trick of pretending to be a blind man, has been erected in Kyiv, Ukraine.

The Estonian punk rock band Vennaskond entitled its first album (released in 1991, during the fall of the Soviet Union) "Ltn. Schmidti Pojad" ("The Sons Of Lieutenant Schmidt").

During repairs on the Lieutenant Schmidt Bridge in Saint Petersburg in 2006, the builders erected a temporary bridge some meters above. The temporary construction was nicknamed "Son of Lieutenant Schmidt".
