= Trone =

Trone is a surname. Notable people with the surname include:

- David Trone (born 1955), American businessman and politician; U.S. Representative from Maryland
- Sarah Trone Garriott (born 1978), American politician and minister; U.S. Representative-elect from Iowa
- Solomon Trone (1872–1969), Russian-American engineer, and industrial advisor to Israel, China and India

== See also ==
- Trône/Troon metro station, a Brussels metro station
- Trône, a 2017 album by Booba
- Trones (disambiguation)
