= Pallenberg =

Pallenberg is a surname. Notable people with the surname include:

- Anita Pallenberg (1942–2017), German-Italian actress, artist, and model
- Max Pallenberg (1877–1934), Austrian singer, actor, and comedian
- Rospo Pallenberg (born 1939), American screenwriter and film director
