= Pichler's Books Are Not in Order =

1961 film

- Directed by: Hans Quest
- Written by: Helmuth M. Backhaus; Theo Lingen
- Based on: The Embezzlers by Alfred Polgar
- Produced by: Walter Koppel
- Starring: Theo Lingen; Georg Thomalla; Karin Dor
- Cinematography: Albert Benitz
- Edited by: Alice Ludwig
- Music by: Michael Jary
- Production company: Real Film
- Distributed by: Europa Filmverleih
- Release date: 19 May 1961
- Running time: 90 minutes
- Country: West Germany
- Language: German

Pichler's Books Are Not in Order (German: Bei Pichler stimmt die Kasse nicht) is a 1961 West German comedy film directed by Hans Quest and starring Theo Lingen, Georg Thomalla and Karin Dor. It was shot at the Wandsbek Studios in Hamburg. The film's sets were designed by the art directors Albrecht Becker and Herbert Kirchhoff. It is based on the play The Embezzlers by Alfred Polgar, previously adapted into a 1931 film The Virtuous Sinner starring Heinz Rühmann.

== Synopsis ==
The small-town accountant Pichler and his assistant Vittgers, who happens to be in love with his daughter Anneliese, head to Hamburg in order to hand over the company's payroll to the head of their firm. The two naïve figures are soon caught up with the iniquity of the city's, particularly its famous red-light district St. Pauli. Anneliese, who has come in pursuit of them, manages to save them from any more financial losses or disgrace.

== Cast ==
- Theo Lingen as Pichler
- Georg Thomalla as Vittgers
- Karin Dor as Anneliese
- Fita Benkhoff as Ludmilla
- Ruth Stephan as Isabella
- Karl Schönböck as Direktor Härtel
- Edith Hancke as Emma
- Joseph Offenbach as Klapper
- Kurt A. Jung as Kriz
- Inge Schmidt as Frl. Kahl
- Josef Dahmen as Manager
- Birgit Bergen as Inge
- Hans W. Hamacher as Gast
- Richard Münch as Falschspieler
- Christa Siems as Garderobenfrau
- Volker Lechtenbrink as Robert Pichler
- Ulrich Matschoss as Kriminalkommissar

== Bibliography ==
- Bock, Hans-Michael & Bergfelder, Tim. The Concise CineGraph. Encyclopedia of German Cinema. Berghahn Books, 2009.
- Elsaesser, Thomas & Wedel, Michael . The BFI Companion to German Cinema. British Film Institute, 1999.
- Goble, Alan. The Complete Index to Literary Sources in Film. Walter de Gruyter, 1999.
