= Time, Forward! (novel) =

1932 novel by Valentin Katayev

- Author: Valentin Katayev
- Original title: Время, вперёд!
- Language: Russian
- Genre: Socialist realism
- Publisher: Krasnaya Nov (1932)
- Publication place: Soviet Union
- Media type: print (Hardback & Paperback)
- Preceded by: The Embezzlers
- Followed by: A White Sail Gleams

Time, Forward! (Russian: Время, вперёд!, romanized: Vremya, vperyod!) is a novel by Valentin Katayev, first published in the January–October (Nos. 1-10) 1932 issues of Krasnaya Nov magazine. It came out as a separate edition in 1933. The book takes place over the course of one day and describes the attempts of a group of shock workers to break the record for most batches of concrete mixed in a day.

The novel was adapted by Katayev into a screenplay for a 1965 movie.

== Background ==
The novel was based upon the experience its author had in 1931, during his several months' stay in the city of Magnitogorsk, which was still then in the process of being constructed and built. Katayev described it as a 'historical chronicle', driven by the idea of "mobilizing the contemporary readership," but also making a panoramic report on the extraordinary events of the Soviet industrial revolution he'd been witness to, using structures and rhythm experiments to enhance the live, cinematic effect.

== Summary ==
The whole book takes place over a 24-hour period on a construction site in the Ural Mountains during the early 1930s, the heyday of Stalin's Five-Year Plans. The novel is centered on an attempt to beat a concrete-pouring record set elsewhere in the Soviet Union by a shock brigade in Kharkov.

In the morning, Margulies, chief of the construction's sixth sector, wakes up and hears that Kharkov beat the concrete-pouring record. Many workers, like Mosya, immediately propose a counterplan to beat the record. In order to ascertain whether beating the record is feasible, he decides to call his sister in Moscow to obtain a recent report on the limits of concrete pouring. Margulies soon examines the day-to-day operations of the site to figure out how he can optimize production, but he initially forbids Ishchenko, a leader of one shock brigade, from trying to beat Kharkov's record.

Nalbandov, chief engineer of the construction, frets about the attempt to break the record; he thinks the effort is not worth the risk. He goes to see Margulies and tell him that allotting less to each mixture is unsafe. Nalbandov believes quantity cannot be raised without sacrificing quality, whereas Margulies believes that proper techniques can allow raised production without sacrificing quality. Nalbandov resents Margulies for his previous successes on the construction, and does not order Margulies to stop his attempt in the hopes that the concrete is of inferior quality.

During this time, the novelist Georgi Vasilyevich is at the construction site to find inspiration for his latest work. Also visiting the site is Ray Roupe, an American tourist, who explores the site. Nalbandov spends most of the day showing him around and it is noted several times that he likes the “cultured” Americans.

Meanwhile, Sayenko and Zagirov, two wayward workers from one of the shifts, gamble together. Around noon, Katya, having successfully found Professor Smolensky, transcribes the report, which demonstrates that it is theoretically possible to beat Kharkov's record. Margulies’ attitude changes, now believing that the brigades can, and should, try to beat the record.

Soon before the beginning of his shift, Ishchenko's wife goes into labor. He stays at the hospital for a time, but soon abandons his wife to return to the worksite and help the crew with the record.

Sayenko and Zagirov venture to a Kazakh settlement, where they get drunk and eventually fight. Sayenko exploits and beats Zagirov, forces him to drink, and insults him for his ethnicity. Zagirov escapes Sayenko's clutches and returns to the construction site to work the last few hours of the shift.

After leaving the site briefly, Nalbandov accosts Margulies again about what he sees as a reckless increase in production. Margulies is willing to do anything to increase production as long as it can be proven to increase efficiency. Nalbandov disapproves of Margulies's actions but nonetheless refuses to act on his disapproval. He lets Margulies continue, but with the stipulation that the concrete will be tested for quality later.

It begins to rain heavily, making work hard but the men fight the through. At one point they must use a fire hose to clear mud off the planking; but in the end they overcome the elements and work continues.

Because of the increased tempo of the shift, several problems arise. At one, the site runs low on cement, and Korneyev demands more cement to beat the record. The warehouse refuses his request, claiming the shift is over its cement quota already. Kutaisov eventually gets the chief to surrender. Korneyev appropriates two railroad cars of cement and brings them to the site without authorization.

Additionally, Semechkin shuts off the water supply as the crew approaches the record again citing the need to “maintain cost accounting” with a meter. However, Margulies has the water restarted.

The crew produces 401 mixtures by the official end of the shift, but Margulies, arguing the time for the stoppage of the water should not be counted, orders the men back to work for the time that the water was off, enough time to get their tempo to 429 mixtures. Ishchenko is immediately accepted into the party and his fellow workers all receive entry into the Komsomol, the Youth Communist League.

In the second to last chapter, Kataev finally places the omitted first chapter, as a dedication to his friend Sasha Smolyan.

Finally, it is revealed at the very end that all the test cubes passed a test by Nalbandov, vindicating Margulies; however, the last lines convey that a crew from another distant site has already beaten the record set by Ishchenko's crew not even a day after they achieve it, thus signaling the forward progress of the Soviet labor front.
