= Yevgeny Petrov (writer) =

Soviet writer

- Евгений Петрович Петров
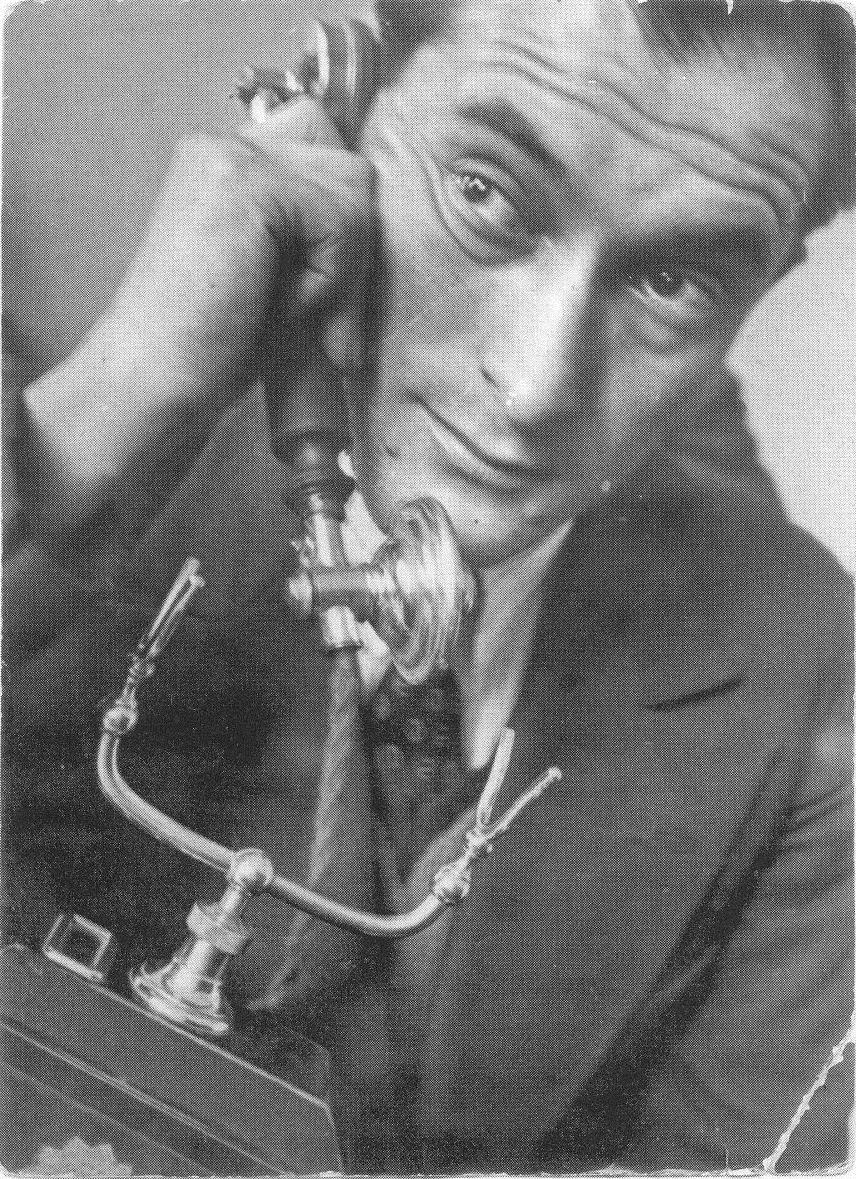
- Yevgeny Petrov (1930)
- Born: Yevgeny Petrovich Katayev; 13 December [O.S. 30 November] 1902; Odessa, Kherson Governorate, Russian Empire
- Died: 2 July 1942 (aged 39); Rostov Oblast, Soviet Union
- Occupations: Novelist, journalist
- Writing career
- Notable works: The Twelve Chairs; The Little Golden Calf; One-storied America

Yevgeny Petrovich Petrov, also spelled Evgeny or Yevgeni, (Евгений Петрович Петров, born Katayev (Катаев); 13 December [O.S. 30 November] 1902 in Odessa – July 2, 1942) was a popular Soviet author in the 1920s and 1930s. He often worked in collaboration with Ilya Ilf. As Ilf and Petrov, they wrote The Twelve Chairs, released in 1928, and its sequel, The Little Golden Calf, released in 1931.

== Biography ==
Petrov was the son of a schoolteacher; at the age of 20 he moved to Moscow and became a writer at Gudok, the railway workers’ newspaper, where he met Ilya Ilf.

In 1935, the two writers travelled to the USA, and spent two months driving from New York to California; they published the story of their travels as Odnoetazhnaia Amerika (One-Storied America).

Following Germany's invasion of the Soviet Union, Petrov became a war correspondent. He was killed in a plane crash while returning from besieged Sevastopol. The short film Envelope was dedicated to him.

He was the brother of Valentin Kataev.
