= Ilya Ilf =

Soviet writer and journalist (1897–1937)

- Илья Ильф
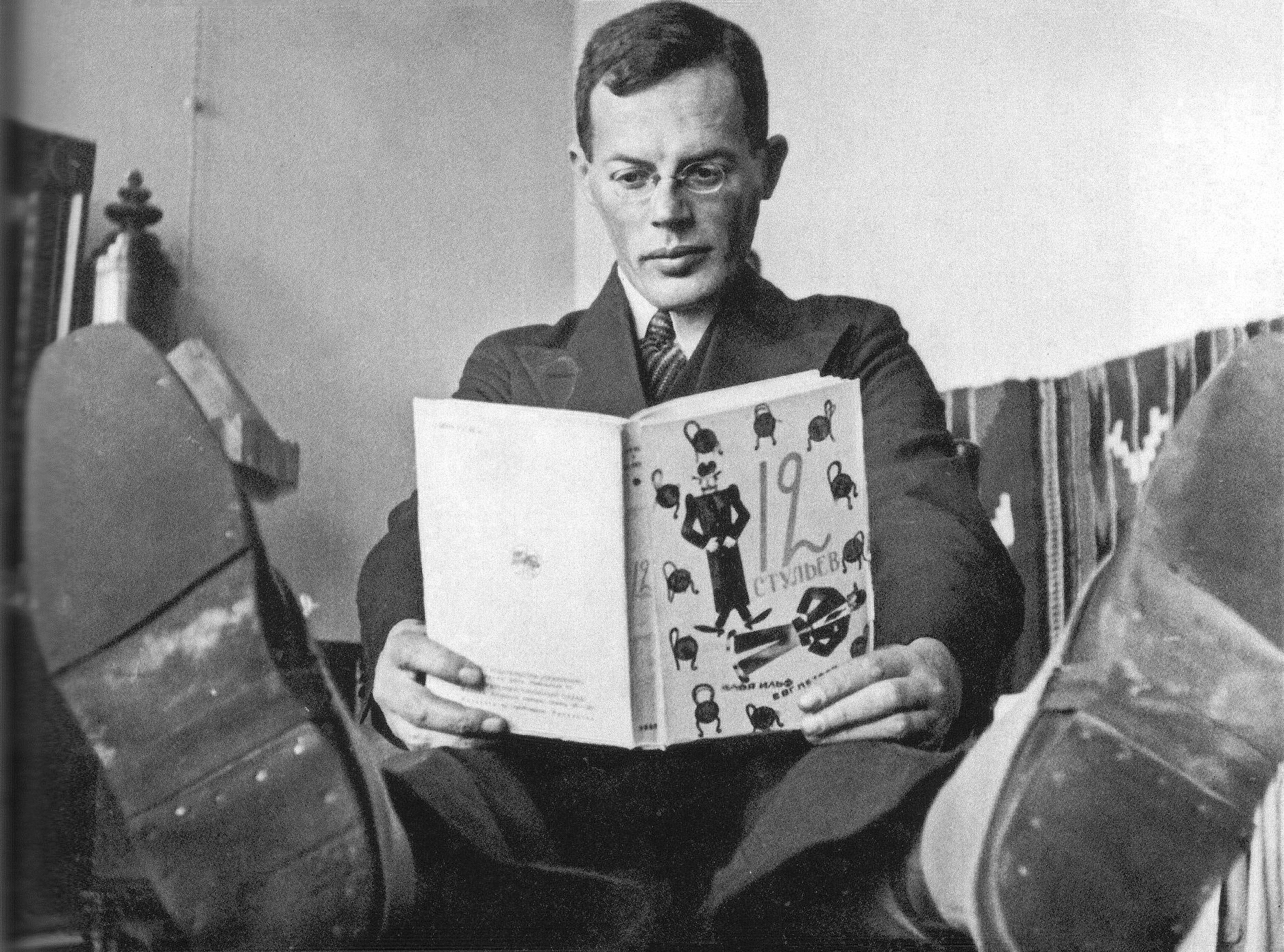
- Ilf reading The Twelve Chairs (1930)
- Born: Iehiel-Leyb Aryevich Faynzilberg; 15 October [O.S. 3 October] 1897; Odessa, Russian Empire
- Died: 13 April 1937 (aged 39); Moscow, Russian SFSR, Soviet Union
- Occupations: Novelist; journalist
- Writing career
- Notable works: The Twelve Chairs; The Little Golden Calf; One-storied America

Ilya Arnoldovich Ilf (born Iehiel-Leyb Aryevich Faynzilberg; Russian: Иехиел-Лейб Арьевич Файнзильберг; 15 October [O.S. 3 October] 1897 – 13 April 1937) was a Soviet journalist and writer of Jewish origin who usually worked in collaboration with Yevgeny Petrov during the 1920s and 1930s. Their duo was known simply as Ilf and Petrov. Together they published two popular comedy novels The Twelve Chairs (1928) and The Little Golden Calf (1931), as well as a satirical book Odnoetazhnaya Amerika (often translated as Little Golden America) that documented their journey through the United States between 1935 and 1936.

== Biography ==
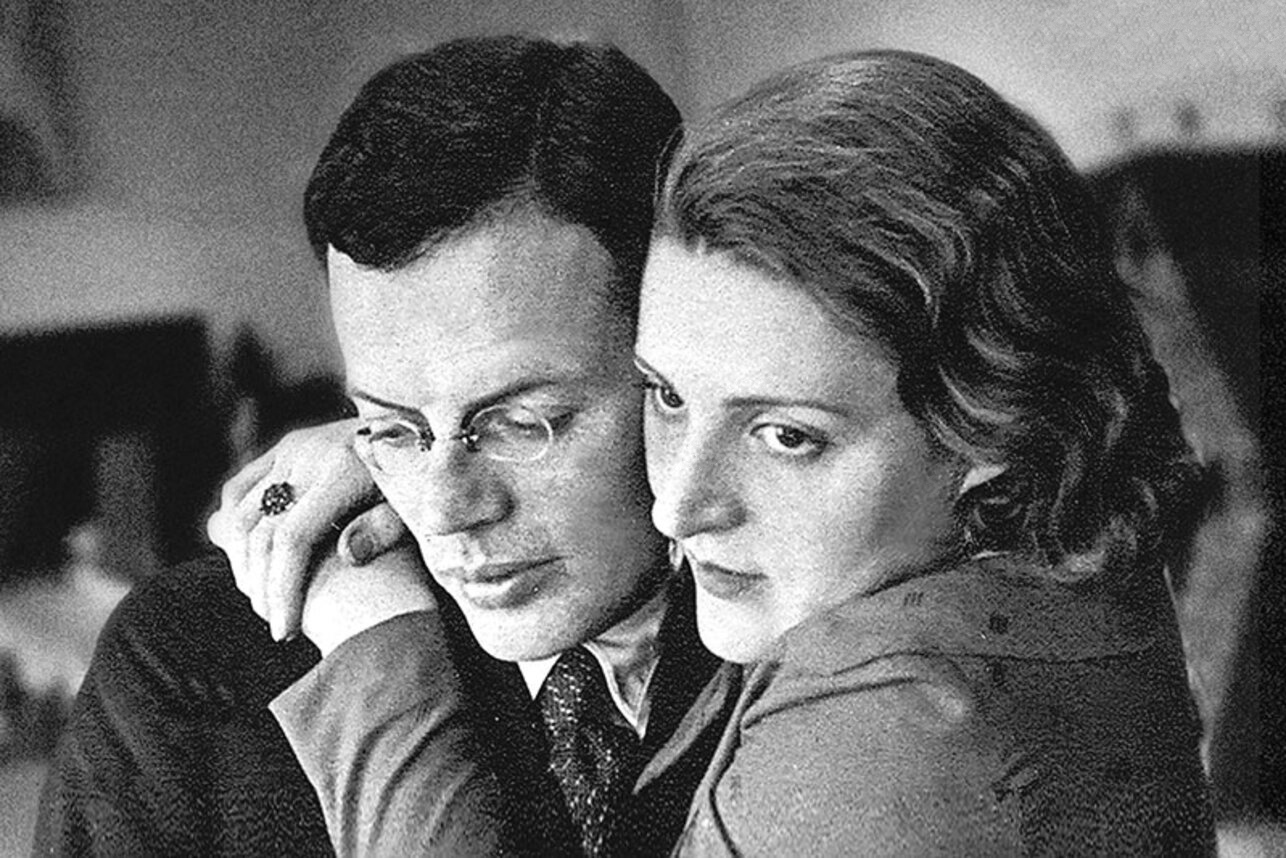
Ilf with his wife Maria

Iliya Ilf (born Faynzilberg) was born on October 15, 1897, in Odessa, he was the third of four sons of Ariye Benjamin Faynzilberg and his wife Mindle Aronovna Faynzilberg (née Kotlova). The family moved from Boguslav to Odessa before Ilf's birth. His father was a Jewish bank clerk. He graduated from a technical school in 1913 and held various positions, including time at the telephone company and a military plant. After the Russian Revolution, he began working as a journalist, editing several humor magazines, and joined the Odessa Union of Poets.

In 1923, he relocated to Moscow and took employment at the newspaper Gudok (roughly "Toot!", meaning the locomotive horn sound), a publication for railway workers. His contributions consisted mostly of satirical pieces. It was there that he met his writing partner, Petrov. In 1928, they were both let go, due to staff reductions, but they were able to find work at Chudak, a literary journal that provided a start for many Soviet writers and artists. From 1932 to 1937, they also wrote pieces for major publications such as Pravda, Literaturnaya Gazeta and Krokodil. Ilf also had a passion for photography, but this was not fully appreciated until years after his death, when his daughter discovered his photograph albums.

== Illness and death ==
Ilf had been diagnosed with tuberculosis in the 1920s. He thought it was in remission, but he was diagnosed with it again during his trip to America, and he died not long after returning. Days later, a Nazi propaganda newspaper, Der Angriff, published an article claiming that Ilf committed suicide following a scathing critique from the Soviet government during a writers' convention. Petrov immediately published a denial in Pravda called "An Answer to Fascist Slanderers", pointing out that his death was caused by illness and that nothing extraordinary happened during the convention, with a full transcript of the proceedings. However, the suicide version is still used by some Western biographers.

== Personal life ==
In 1921, in Odessa, Ilf met the love of his life, Maria Nikolayevna Tarasenko (1904–1981). They married in Moscow in 1924, and had a daughter Aleksandra born in 1935.

Ilf was a passionate photographer. In 1929, Yevgeni Petrov lent him 800 rubles for a camera, and then jokingly regretted that he had lost not only his money but also a friend and co-writer, as Ilf stopped writing and spent most of his time on photography. Long after Ilf's death, his daughter had found and published ca. 200 of his photographs.
