= The Virtuous Sinner =

1931 film

- Directed by: Fritz Kortner
- Written by: Valentin Kataev (novel); Alfred Polgar (play); Fritz Kortner
- Produced by: Arnold Pressburger
- Starring: Max Pallenberg; Heinz Rühmann; Dolly Haas; Josefine Dora
- Cinematography: Günther Krampf
- Edited by: G. Pollatschik
- Music by: Nicholas Brodszky
- Production company: Cine-Allianz Tonfilm
- Distributed by: Bavaria Film
- Release date: 22 October 1931
- Running time: 109 minutes
- Country: Germany
- Language: German

The Virtuous Sinner (German: Der brave Sünder) is a 1931 German comedy film directed by Fritz Kortner and starring Max Pallenberg, Heinz Rühmann and Dolly Haas.

== Production ==
The film was made at the Babelsberg Studio in Berlin, although its setting and many of its principal participants were Austrian. It is based on the play The Embezzlers which was in turn based on a novel by the Soviet writer Valentin Kataev. Max Pallenberg was a successful stage comedian, but had previously rejected all offers to appear in films based on his theatre appearances. He was finally convinced by the producer Arnold Pressburger to try and film one of his stage successes. The film also offered Kortner a chance to fulfill his ambitions to become a director. The film's art director was Julius von Borsody.

== Synopsis ==
Pichler and Wittek, two junior employees of a bank from a provincial Austrian town, travel to Vienna, where they become accidentally embroiled in their director's scheme to embezzle the bank's funds and flee with his mistress. They become desperate as they fear their disgrace. But events ultimately sort themselves out, the dishonest director is arrested, and Pichler is appointed to replace him while Wittek is able to marry Pichler's daughter Hedwig.

== Cast ==
- Max Pallenberg as Leopold Pichler
- Heinz Rühmann as Wittek
- Dolly Haas as Hedwig, Pichler's daughter
- Josefine Dora as Ludmilla Pichler
- Fritz Grünbaum as Kalapka
- Peter Wolff as Karl, Pichler's son
- Julius Brandt as Geschäftsführer
- Louis Ralph as Krull
- Ekkehard Arendt as Direktor Härtl
- Rose Poindexter as Kiddy, dancer

== See also ==
- Pichler's Books Are Not in Order, a 1961 West German remake

== Bibliography ==
- Prawer, S.S. Between Two Worlds: The Jewish Presence in German and Austrian Film, 1910-1933. Berghahn Books, 2005.
