= Trones =

Trones may refer to:

== Places ==
=== Norway ===
- Trones, Nordland, a village in Beiarn Municipality in Nordland county
- Trones, Namsskogan, a village in Namsskogan Municipality in Trøndelag county
- Trones, Verdal, a village area and headland in Verdal Municipality in Trøndelag county
- Trones, Vestland, a village in Ullensvang Municipality in Vestland county
- Trones og Sentrum, a borough in the city of Sandnes in Rogaland county

=== Spain ===
- Trones (Asturias), a parish council in Asturias

== See also ==
- Trone (disambiguation)
