= Pyotr Schmidt =

Russian revolutionary (1867–1906)

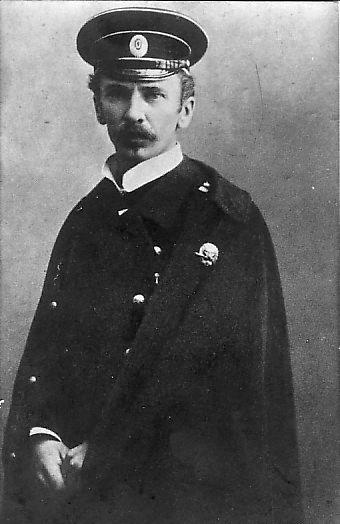
- Born: 17 February [O.S. 5 February] 1867; Odessa, Russian Empire
- Died: 19 March [O.S. 6 March] 1906; Berezan Island, Russian Empire
- Cause of death: Execution by firing squad

Pyotr Petrovich Schmidt (Russian: Пётр Петрович Шмидт; 17 February [O.S. 5 February] 1867 – 19 March [O.S. 6 March] 1906) was one of the leaders of the Sevastopol Uprising during the Russian Revolution of 1905.

== Early years ==
Pyotr Petrovich Schmidt was born in 1867 in Odessa, Russian Empire, now Ukraine, to the family of rear admiral and the head of Berdyansk port, Pyotr Petrovich Schmidt (1828–1888). His father Pyotr Petrovich Schmidt Sr, descendant of Anton Schmidt from Frankfurt am Main, officer in the navy of Peter the Great, participated in the defense of Sevastopol during the Siege of Sevastopol (1854). His mother Yekaterina Yakovlevna Schmidt (born von Wagner) was of German descent. Schmidt spent his youth in Berdyansk, where his father was city governor (gradonachalnik) and city port head. In 1883 Schmidt Jr entered the Naval Officers' Corps in Saint Petersburg and after graduation enrolled in the Imperial Russian Navy. He resigned in 1888 and married Dominika Gavrilovna Pavlova. After the birth of his son Yevgeniy in 1889, the family moved to Taganrog, where Alexander Nentzel, manager of the Azov-Don Commercial Bank offered him a bookkeeper position. In 1893, Schmidt left Taganrog and enrolled again in the Imperial Russian Navy.

== Uprising in the Black Sea Fleet ==
The uprising in the Black Sea Fleet was part of the Russian Revolution of 1905. Schmidt was a lieutenant commander of the destroyer Number 253 in the Imperial Russian Navy. On 1 October 1905, he made a speech during a meeting in Sevastopol, urging the citizens to stand up for their rights and demanding the authorities free political prisoners. Participants of the meeting headed towards the city prison, where they were met with machine gun fire. In the following days, Pyotr Schmidt gave a speech at the special session of the Sevastopol City Council and at the cemetery during the funeral ceremony, where he was arrested. He was conveyed to the battleship Tri Sviatitelia, which provoked protests and the authorities were forced to release him. On 7 November 1905, Schmidt was retired with the rank of captain (капитан 2 ранга).

The uprising continued and with the cruiser Ochakov in its center. On November 26, 1905, a mutiny began the cruiser, and its officers were expelled from the ship. Lieutenant Commander Schmidt, though not being a member of RSDRP, was invited to take command of the rebel ships, including the minelayer Griden, gunboat Usuriets, destroyers Zavetniy, Zorkiy, Svirepiy, 265, 268, 270, training ship Dnestr and mine carrier Bug. The same day, the Soviets of Sailors' and Soldiers' Deputies decided to start a Black Sea Fleet-wide mutiny and appoint Schmidt as Commander of the Fleet. On November 28, Pyotr Schmidt arrived on board the cruiser Ochakov, which raised the red flag and the signal Commanding the Fleet. The rebel squadron was also joined by the battleship Panteleimon. The revolutionary forces made up some 8,200 vs. 10,000 government forces. Schmidt sent a telegram to Emperor Nicholas II of Russia:

The glorious Black Sea Fleet, sacredly devoted to the people, demands Your Majesty to immediately call a meeting of the Constituent Assembly (Учредительное собрание), and no longer obeys orders of Your ministers. Commander of the Fleet P. Schmidt.

The commander of the Imperial Russian forces, General Alexander Meller-Zakomelsky, gave an ultimatum demanding immediate capitulation, but there was no reply. Three hours after the ultimatum, the government forces opened fire at rebel ships and barracks. In 90 minutes, the revolutionary squadron was defeated by the government ships led by the battleship Rostislav. Schmidt and his 16-year-old son were captured, and all who remained alive were arrested. The next day, the government forces supported by artillery took the rebel barracks.

== Death ==
A closed hearing was held in February 1906 in a small fortress in the island of Tendra near Sebastopol. Schmidt and other leaders of the uprising were sentenced to death. He was executed on 19 March 1906 at Berezan Island by the crew of the gunboat Terets.

== Aftermath ==
In 1922, Mikhail Stavraki, commander of the gunboat's firing squad was discovered in Batumi in possession of five fake passports in different names and old bank notes, by Cheka agents. The trial of Stavraki, who was Schmidt's classmate at the Naval Corps in St Petersburg, was held on 1 April 1923 in Sebastopol, while most of the witnesses and participants of the events were still alive. On 3 April 1923 the Military Board of the Supreme Court of the USSR sentenced Stavraki to death by firing squad.

== Places named after Pyotr Schmidt ==
- Blagoveshchensky Bridge (the Annunciation Bridge), a major bridge across the Neva River in Saint Petersburg, Russia was called "Lieutenant Schmidt Bridge" in memory of Pyotr Schmidt from 1918 to 2007.
- In 1924 a fisherman discovered the spot where Schmidt and other revolutionaries had been shot dead. The remains were buried in Sevastopol, and in the 1960s a 15-metre-high stela was placed on the island of Berezan.
- After the Russian Civil War streets in several Soviet cities were named after Lieutenant Schmidt: in Astrakhan, Bataisk, Vinnytsia, Vologda, Vyazma, Berdiansk, Tver (boulevard), Vladivostok, Yeysk, Gatchina, Dnipro, Donetsk, Yegoryevsk, Kazan, Lysva, Murmansk, Babrujsk, Nizhniy Tagil, Novorossiysk, Odessa, Pervomaisk, Ochakiv, Samara, Sevastopol, Simferopol, Taganrog (unofficially the widest street in the world; its sides are situated on different sides of the bay), Tyumen, Kerch, Kropyvnytskyi, Kremenchuk, Kamianets-Podilsky, Khabarovsk, Kharkiv, Liubotyn, Melitopol, Petropavlovsk.
- On 31 December 1922 the old (1899) torpedo boat Svirepy of the Sokol class was renamed Lieutenant Schmidt. It was decommissioned in 1927.

== In popular culture ==
- Boris Pasternak wrote a poem about him entitled “Lieutenant Schmidt”.
- There are two operas based on his life: the first was written in 1938 (composer NI Platonov), the second in 1970 (composer BL Yarovinsky, staged in 1970 by VM Sklyarenko at the Kharkov Opera House).
- The 1969 film Postal Novel depicts his complex relationship with Zinaida Riesberg, on the basis of their correspondence. He is played by Alexander Parra.
- In the classic film We’ll Live Till Monday, there is a long discussion about him in one of the final scenes, where one of the students claims that Schmidt's sacrifice was foolish, only to have the teacher (played by Vyacheslav Tikhonov) counter that it is easy to say things like this with historical hindsight. He then launches into a detailed portrait of Schmidt's accomplishments, and urges the children to read his correspondence with Zinaida Riesberg.

== See also ==
- Children of Lieutenant Schmidt
