= One-storied America =

1937 travelogue by Ilf and Petrov

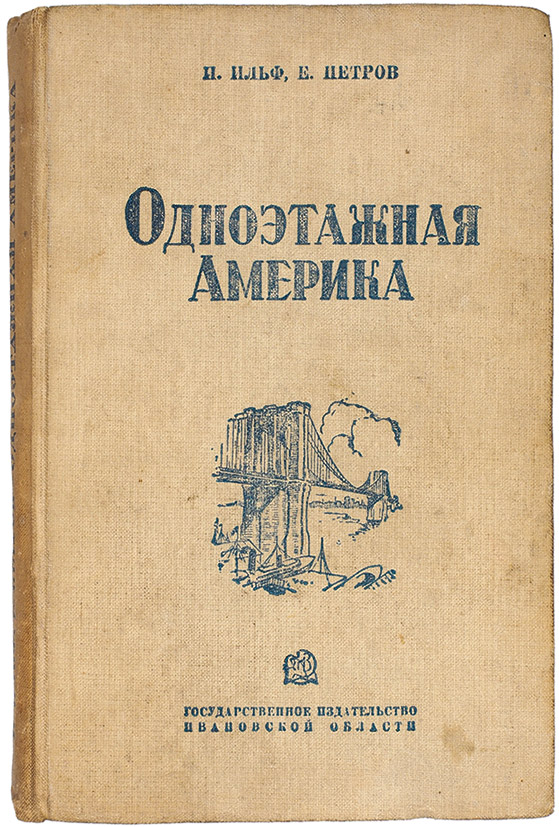
- Cover of the 1937 edition
- Author: Ilf and Petrov
- Original title: Одноэтажная Америка
- Language: Russian
- Publication date: 1937
- Publication place: Soviet Union

One-storied America (Russian: Одноэтажная Америка) is a 1937 book based on a published travelogue across the United States by two Soviet authors, Ilf and Petrov. The book, divided into eleven chapters and in the uninhibited humorous style typical of Ilf and Petrov, paints a multi-faceted picture of the US. America's entrepreneurial skills and economic achievements are praised, the oppression of the Black Americans, the life of the Native Americans in the reservations and the oppression of workers are denounced. The title of the book refers to their impression that the cities of America consist mainly of one- and two-story buildings, in complete contrast to the popular image of America as the land of skyscrapers. Based on this sentence:

America is primarily a one- and two-story country. The majority of the American population lives in small towns of three thousand, maybe five, nine, or fifteen thousand inhabitants.

The United States, which was perceived as the land of machines and technological progress, was of great importance at the time for the Soviet Union, which had set itself the goal of overtaking the United States. This slogan (Russian: догнать и перегнать Америку; "catch up and surpass America") was one of the most important slogans during the ambitious industrialization of the Soviet Union. Given the political climate in the Soviet Union in 1937 when the book was published, with the onset of Great Purge, it is surprising that a version of a book that lovingly satirizes the United States was published.

== Origins ==
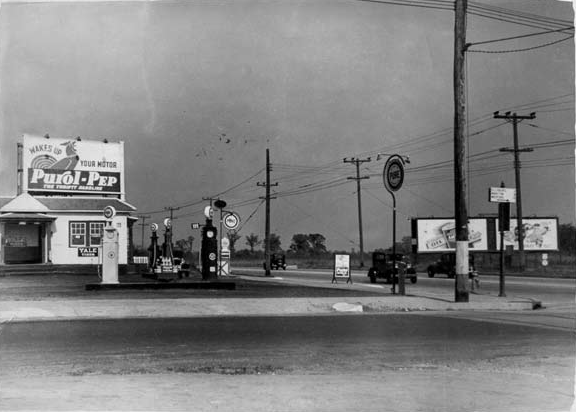
Photo taken by Ilf, who wrote "I would like to caption this picture as follows: "This is America!"" (1936)

Ilf and Petrov traveled across the Great Depression-era United States.

On October 7, 1935, a few years after the onset of the Great Depression (1929 to 1933), the writers Ilf and Petrov, correspondents of Pravda newspaper, arrived in New York on the SS Normandie passenger ship, which was the most modern ship of the time and its tenth voyage between Europe and America. In those days, the President of the United States was Franklin Roosevelt, who did a lot for rapprochement between the United States and the USSR. This allowed the authors to freely move around the country and get acquainted with the life of different layers of American society.

The authors lived in America for ten weeks. During this time, they crossed the country twice from end to end. Ilf and Petrov did not speak English and sometimes used the help of Russian-speaking guides. Ilf took many pictures throughout the journey, and the authors produced a photo essay entitled "American Photographs", published in the popular Soviet magazine Ogoniok — a Soviet analogue to Time Magazine.

Work on "One-Story America" began in the United States. The essay "Normandy", which opens the book, was written by Ilf and Petrov shortly after their arrival in America. Under the heading "The Road to New York," it appeared with minor abbreviations in Pravda on November 24, 1935. During the writers' stay in America, Pravda also published their essay "American Encounters" (January 5, 1936), which in the book concludes the 25th chapter, "The Desert".

They returned to Moscow in early February 1936 and announced in an interview with a correspondent for Literaturnaya Gazeta that they would write a book about America. Ilf and Petrov published their first brief notes about the trip in 1936 in the Ogonyok magazine under the title "American Photos". The text was accompanied by about 150 American photographs by Ilf, which captured the appearance of the country and portraits of people with whom the writers met in America.

In 1936, the travel sketches "One-story America" were first published in the magazine "Banner". In 1937 they were published as a separate publication in Roman-Gazeta, in Goslitizdat and in the publishing house Soviet Writer. In the same year the book was reprinted in the Russian cities of Ivanovo, Khabarovsk, Smolensk.

"One-Story America" was written rather quickly – in the summer months of 1936. While the book was being written, Pravda published five more essays from it:

- June 18 – "Travel to the country of bourgeois democracy";
- July 4 – New York;
- July 12 – Electric Gentlemen;
- September 5 – Glorious City of Hollywood;
- October 18 – "In Carmel".

The first edition of the book was supposed to feature Ilf's photographs, but for reasons that remain unknown it was published without any illustrations. Both the photo essay and the book document their adventures with their characteristic humor and playfulness. Notably, Ilf and Petrov were not afraid to praise many aspects of the American lifestyle in these works.

Ilf died of tuberculosis soon after his return (April 1937) just as the first edition of the book appeared in print in 1937. The first signs of his tuberculosis became apparent during the trip to America.

== Plot ==
Four people (both authors and the Adams married couple from New York) bought a brand new Ford with a "noble mouse color" and crossed America from the Atlantic to the Pacific Ocean and back in two months (late 1935-early 1936).

The authors:

- deeply detailed ordinary life of Americans of that time;
- They acquainted the reader with many American celebrities including Ernest Hemingway, Henry Ford, J. P. Morgan Jr., Albert Rhys Williams, Francis Townsend, Joseph Steffens, Bette Davis, etc.;
- Described many cities and towns in America: New York, Chicago, Kansas, Oklahoma, Las Vegas, San Francisco, Los Angeles, San Diego, El Paso, San Antonio, New Orleans and the US capital – Washington DC;
- They visited an Indian wigwam and a Mexican village;
- Periodically meet with Russian emigrants, including Spiritual Christian Molokans in San Francisco;
- They talked about some of the national sports: rodeo, wrestling, American football and Mexican bullfighting;
- They climbed to the roof of the Empire State Building in New York and descend deep underground into the Carlsbad caves;
- Described in detail the unique American invention – the Sing Sing prison "electric chair" and the creation of the first light bulb and phonograph by Edison;
- Explained the most beautiful landscapes of America found in the prairies, mountains, forests, and deserts;
- Visited the White House, where President Roosevelt held a conversation with United States reporters;
- Explains in detail about the production of films in Hollywood;
- In Hollywood, they spent two weeks writing a screenplay for Lewis Milestone.

The authors criticized the standard life of Americans, their intellectual passivity, especially young people, and their gullibility. At the same time, the authors admired American roads and excellent service, work ethic, cleanliness and a clear organization in everyday life and at work.

From "One-Story America" the Soviet reader first learned about publicity, life on credit and the ideology of consumption (In the chapter "Mr. Ripley's Electric House").

== Excerpts ==
American impressions were explained by the authors in the fiction section of the newspaper, "Hours and People" (1937).

In the Ford plant in Dearborn, was technology that enslaved and crushed people, where workers, chained to machine tools and conveyors, seem to be people deeply unhappy. We seemed to be on another planet. We saw other young workers, healthy and cheerful, passionate about their work, disciplined, friendly with their leaders. We knew about this difference before coming to America, but somehow abstractly. And now, under the still fresh impression of what he had seen in America, we admired this contrast. Every American had instilled the indisputable confidence that we will overcome everything, that everything will be fine and that it cannot be otherwise.

== Reprints ==
During Soviet times, the book was reprinted in 1947, 1961 and 1966, but in these editions its text was subjected to political censorship. Thus, references to Stalin and other political figures disappeared from the text. The text underwent an especially large number of edits when it was published in the Collected Works of Ilf and Petrov in 1961. For example, the sympathetic mention of Charles Lindbergh's move from America to Europe after the abduction and murder of his son disappeared from the text, which was probably due to the subsequent friendly relationship of Lindbergh with Nazi German leaders, including Hermann Göring, who awarded Lindbergh the Nazi German decoration Commander Cross of the Order of the German Eagle.

In 2003, a new edition of the book, restored from the original source, was published, including previously unpublished materials from the personal archive of Alexandra Ilyinichna Ilf (daughter of I. Ilf). It first published the letters that Ilf sent to his wife and daughter during the trip, and photographs taken by him in the United States. Together with Petrov's letters, they represent a kind of travel diary and naturally complement the book.

In the 2000s, several American universities successfully held exhibitions of Ilf's "American photographs", and in New York a translation of the 1936 "Ogoniok" publication with numerous Ilf photographs were published as Ilf and Petrov's American Road Trip: The 1935 Travelogue of Two Soviet Writers (ISBN 978-1616892524).

== Translations ==
One-Story America has been repeatedly published in Bulgarian, English, Spanish, Czech, Serbian, Romanian, French, Italian and other languages.

In the US, One-storey America was first published in 1937, after Ilf's death, by the publishing house Farrar & Rinehart, which entitled the book Little Golden America. This name was invented by the publisher, despite the protests of the author – Evgeny Petrov and translator Charles Malamuth. According to the publisher, this title was supposed to remind readers of the previous book by Ilf and Petrov The Little Golden Calf, previously published in the United States.

== Reception ==
Ilf and Petrov's travelogue was criticized in the Soviet Union because it was not party enough and praised many aspects of American life.

"One-Story America" was a hit with American readers and received a lot of praise in the press, including:

This book should be noted as a very significant work. Americans and America would benefit greatly if they considered these observations. – The Morning Call

Not many of our foreign guests were this distance from Broadway and the main streets of Chicago; not many could tell about their impressions with such liveliness and humor. – New York Herald Tribune

Here is a book that Americans should read and ponder. We have no right to be angry and rage at the sight of a painted picture. Maybe we really remind her. – Saturday Review of Literature

This is one of the best books foreigners have written about America. It is a pleasant but sometimes hectic experience to rediscover America through the eyes of the authors of this book. – News Courier, North Carolina

The authors did not allow themselves to be fooled for one minute. They saw slums near the main streets, they saw poverty next to luxury, dissatisfaction with life, everywhere breaking out. – New Masses

== Mini-series ==
Channel One Russia created a 16-part mini-series in 2008. The goal was not to film the book, but to show viewers what America is today. Two journalists, Vladimir Posner, who grew up in the US, and the younger Ivan Urgant followed the route described in the book (with a few variations, e.g. a trip to Las Vegas) and conducted interviews with locals. The two were accompanied by the American writer and radio journalist Brian Kahn from Montana. The series mixes excerpts and old photos from the book with current images of the same locations. The film compares the impressions of Ilf and Petrov with today's impressions of the film authors.

The film crew traveled 17,000 km through America, 25 states and 50 cities in 52 days. The route ran through New York, Cleveland, Detroit, Peoria, Colorado Springs, Gallup, the Grand Canyon, Las Vegas, San Francisco, Los Angeles, El Paso, Houston, New Orleans, Memphis, Washington, DC back to New York.

Episode	Release date	Film location	Main topic
01	February 11, 2008	New York City	
02	February 18, 2008	New York State	United States health care system
03	February 26, 2008	Factories in Michigan	Immigrants to the United States
04	March 3, 2008	Chicago	Healthy lifestyle and obesity in the United States
05	March 11, 2008	Route 66 Peoria, Illinois; Oklahoma City (59. Highway Patrol Academy in Oklahoma)	The highway patrol in the United States
06	March 17, 2008	Gallup, New Mexico	Life of the Indians in the United States
07	March 24, 2008	Colorado Springs, Colorado (United States Air Force Academy) Grand Canyon	
08	March 31, 2008	Las Vegas	
09	April 21, 2008	San Francisco, Silicon Valley	
10	April 7, 2008	Los Angeles	American films
11	April 14, 2008	Sun City, Arizona El Paso, Texas	
12	28. April 2008	New Orleans, Louisiana	
13	May 4, 2008	Angola State Prison	Prisons in the United States
14	May 12, 2008	Tennessee (St. Jude Children's Research Hospital in Memphis, Tennessee) Norfolk, Virginia (Norfolk Naval Base)	
15	May 19, 2008	Washington, D.C.	African Americans and United States
16	May 26, 2008	New York City	
