= Max Pallenberg =

Austrian singer, actor and comedian

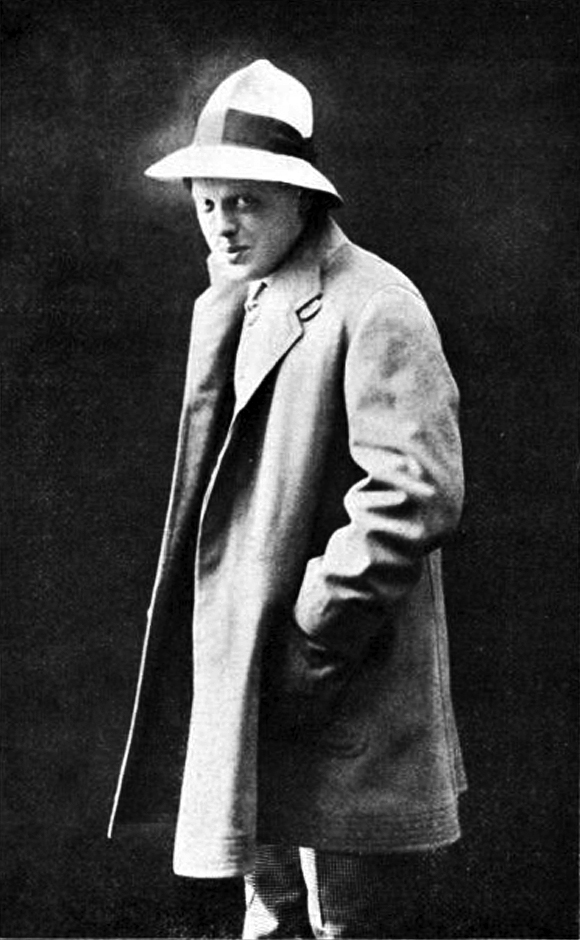
- Born: 18 December 1877; Vienna, Austria-Hungary
- Died: 26 June 1934 (aged 56); Karlovy Vary, Czechoslovakia
- Occupations: singer, actor and comedian

Max Pallenberg (born 18 December 1877 in Vienna as Max Pollack – 26 June 1934 in Karlovy Vary) was an Austrian singer, actor and comedian.

Although Pallenberg's career started in 1904 it wasn't until 1909 that he joined Theater an der Wien, and in 1911 Vienna's Volkstheater. However, it was at Berlin's Deutsches Theater where he left a lasting mark on German theatrical practice. He worked there with Max Reinhardt.

Pallenberg's stellar role was in the Erwin Piscator's dramatic adaptation of Jaroslav Hašek's novel The Good Soldier Schweik.

In 1917 he married Fritzi Massary who was one of the divas of the 1920s. In 1933 they left Germany for Austria. A year later he died in an airplane crash near Karlovy Vary in today's Czech Republic. He was cremated at Feuerhalle Simmering, where his ashes are also buried.

Pallenberg also starred in several films:

- "Pampulik als Affe" (1912)
- "Pampulik kriegt ein Kind" (1912)
- "Pampulik hat Hunger" (1913)
- "Max und seine zwei Frauen" (1915)
- "Der rasende Roland" (1915)
- "Kapellmeister Pflegekind" (1915)
- "Die Nacht und der Leichnam" (1921)
- The Virtuous Sinner (1931) with Heinz Rühmann
