= The Little Golden Calf =

1931 novel by Ilya Ilf and Yevgeny Petrov

The Golden Calf
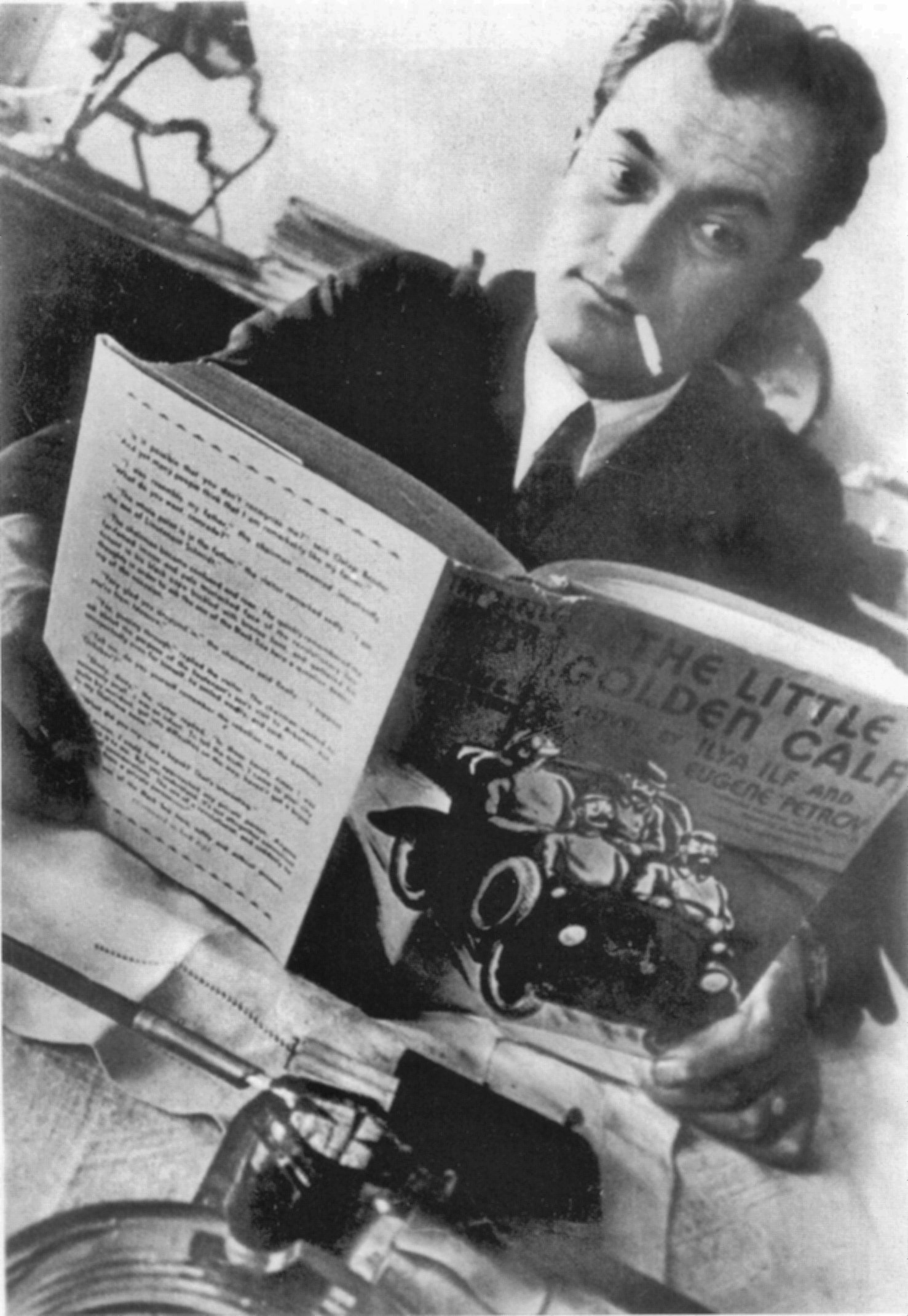
- Evgeny Petrov with first English edition of the novel
- Author: Ilf and Petrov
- Original title: Золотой телёнок
- Language: Russian
- Genre: Satirical novel
- Publication date: 1931
- Publication place: Soviet Union
- Media type: Print (Hardback & Paperback)
- ISBN: 1-934824-07-0
- Preceded by: The Twelve Chairs

The Little Golden Calf (Russian: Золотой телёнок, Zolotoy telyonok) is a satirical picaresque novel by Soviet authors Ilf and Petrov, published in 1931. Its main character, Ostap Bender, also appears in a previous novel by the authors called The Twelve Chairs. The title alludes to the "golden calf" of the Bible.

== Plot summary ==
Ostap Bender is still alive (but sports a scar across his neck), after barely surviving the assassination attempt in the previous book, which he once briefly mentions as "stupid business". This time he hears a story about a "clandestine millionaire" named Alexandr Koreiko. Koreiko has made millions through various illegal enterprises by taking advantage of the widespread corruption in the New Economic Policy (NEP) period while pretending to live on an office clerk's salary of 46 rubles a month. Koreiko lives in Chernomorsk (literally: Black Sea city, referring to the city of Odesa) and keeps his large stash of ill-gotten money in a suitcase, waiting for the fall of the Soviet government, so that he can make use of it.

Expecting a long time of search for Koreiko, Bender decides to legalize himself and sets up a fictional enterprise "Horns and Hoofs", allegedly in charge of procurement of raw material for hair comb and button industry, headed by "sitz-chairman Funt", a professional "prison-sitter" (German "sitzen" means to "sit"), whose sole responsibility was to "sit" in a prison in the case of legal troubles, with salary doubled. Literary critic Yuri Shcheglov writes that there indeed was such an occupation at the break of the 19th and 20th centuries.

Together with two petty criminals Balaganov and Panikovsky, and an extremely naive and innocent car driver Kozlevich, Bender finds out about Koreiko and starts to collect all the information he can get on his business activities. Koreiko tries to flee, but Bender eventually tracks him down in Turkestan, on the newly built Turkestan–Siberia Railway. He then blackmails him into giving him a million rubles.

Suddenly rich, Bender faces the problem of how to spend his money in a Communist country where there are no legal millionaires. Nothing of the life of the rich that Bender dreamt of seems possible in the Soviet Union. Frustrated, Bender even decides to anonymously donate the money to the Ministry of Finance, but changes his mind. He turns the money into jewels and gold, and tries to cross the Romanian border, only to be robbed by the Romanian border guards, leaving him only with a medal, the Order of the Golden Fleece.

== Main characters ==
- Ostap Ibragimovich Bender, the main character and protagonist
- Shura Balaganov, the second "Son of Lieutenant Schmidt"
- Mikhail Samuelevich Panikovsky, the third "Son of Lieutenant Schmidt"
- Adam Kazimirovich Kozlevich, a "Wildebeest" taxi (Russian: "Антилопа Гну") driver
- Alexandr Ivanovich Koreiko, a clandestine millionaire who works as a simple accountant

== Two endings ==
There are two alternative endings to The Golden Calf. One was written at the time the novel was originally submitted for publication to the Thirty Days magazine. The other appeared later, probably due to the objections to the writers for lionizing their main character. According to the first, Ostap Bender, after obtaining his "million", gets to know the sorrow of a lonely man who has fulfilled his purpose, renounces the fortune, and marries his beloved, Zoya Sinitskaya. In the second, he is torn. At first, he returns his "million" to the Commissariat of Finance, but then changes his mind. Determined to travel to Rio de Janeiro, he is caught crossing the Romanian border and sent back home, after being robbed of his fortune by Romanian border guards.

== Cultural influence ==
The book contributed a number of catchphrases and colorful terms into the Russian language, such as "Horns and Hoofs company ("Рога и копыта")" for dummy corporation, "sitz-chairman" for a chairman with no real rights, and "Children of Lieutenant Schmidt" for con men, see the Wikiquote page for the book for more.

=== Adaptations ===
Mikhail Schweitzer made a black-and-white film The Golden Calf (1968) with Sergey Yursky as Bender. It was adapted as Mechty Idiota (Idiot's Dreams, 1993) by director Vasili Pichul, starring pop singer Sergei Krylov as Bender. The Russian Channel One aired an eight-part TV series The Golden Calf (2006) starring Oleg Menshikov as Bender. Miklós Szinetár directed a 3.30 hours Hungarian adaptation TV-series Aranyborjú (1974) starring Iván Darvas as Ostap Bender. The 2009 translation into English, The Little Golden Calf by Anne O. Fisher (published by Russian Life Books) was the first unabridged, uncensored translation into English of the novel. The translation won the 2010 AATSEEL Award for Best Translation into English from any Slavic language.
