= Annunciation Bridge =

Bridge in Saint Petersburg, Russia

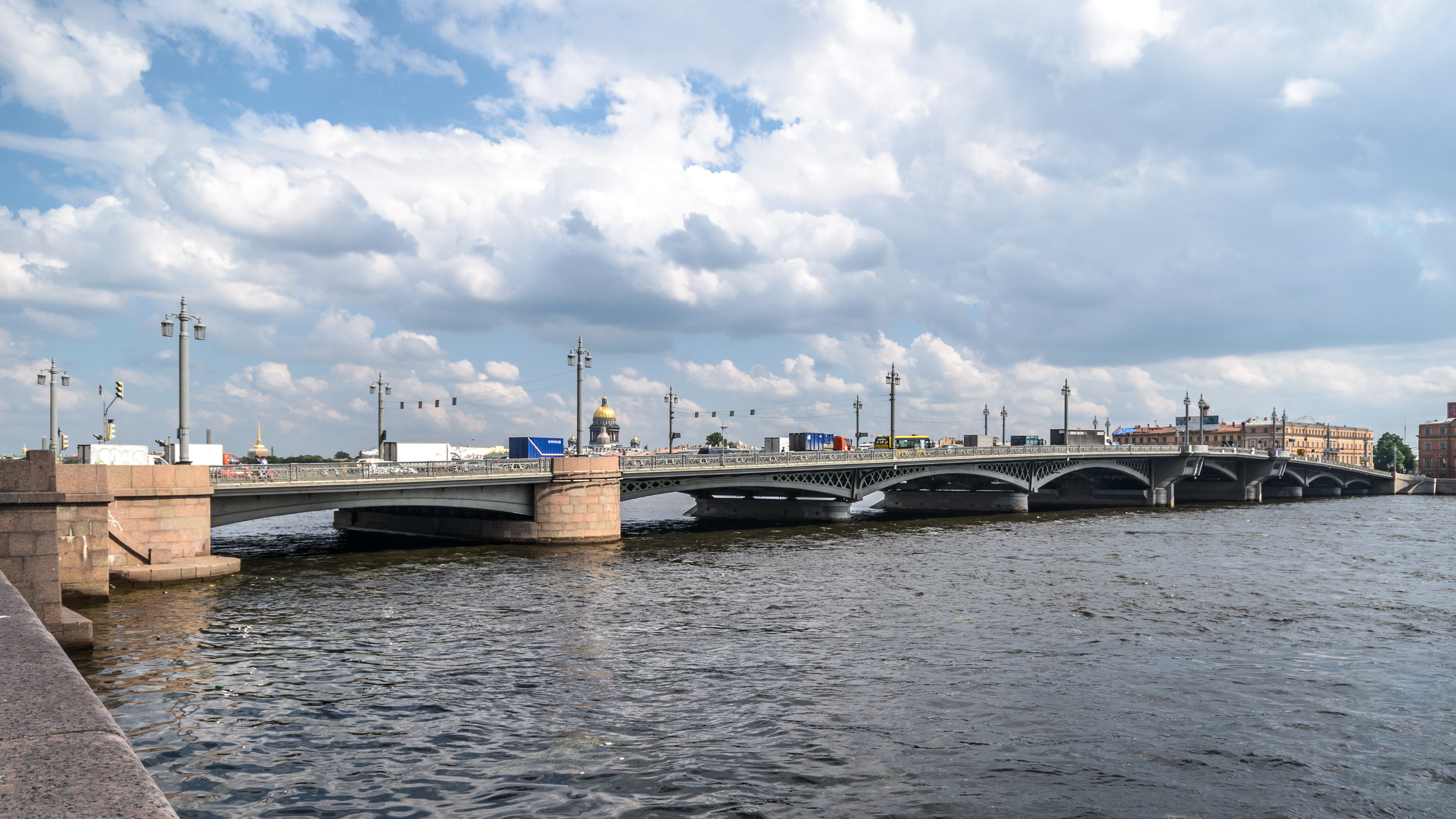
- Coordinates: 59.934653°N 30.289695°E
- Carries: pedestrian and vehicular traffic
- Crosses: Neva River
- Locale: Saint Petersburg, Russia
- Official name: Blagoveshchensky most

Characteristics
- Design: Girder bridge with a bascule section
- Total length: 331 m
- Width: 37 m

History
- Construction start: 1843, 1936, 2006
- Construction end: 1850, August 15, 2007
- Opened: November 12, 1850

Location
- Interactive map of Annunciation Bridge

The Annunciation Bridge (Russian: Благовещенский мост, romanized: Blagoveshchensky most) (Note: The bridge was named Nikolaevsky (Николаевский мост) from 1855 to 1918 and Lieutenant Schmidt Bridge (Мост Лейтенанта Шмидта) from 1918 to 2007.) is a drawbridge in Saint Petersburg, Russia. It is the first permanent bridge built across the Neva River within the city. It connects Vasilievsky Island to the central part of the city (Admiralteysky District). The bridge's length is 331 meters and its width is 24 meters.

== Name ==
The original name of the bridge was Nevsky Bridge. It was later renamed Blagoveshchensky (Annunciation) Bridge. After the death of Emperor Nicholas I of Russia, it was named Nikolaevsky Bridge in his honor, and in 1918 it was renamed for Lieutenant Schmidt.

== History ==
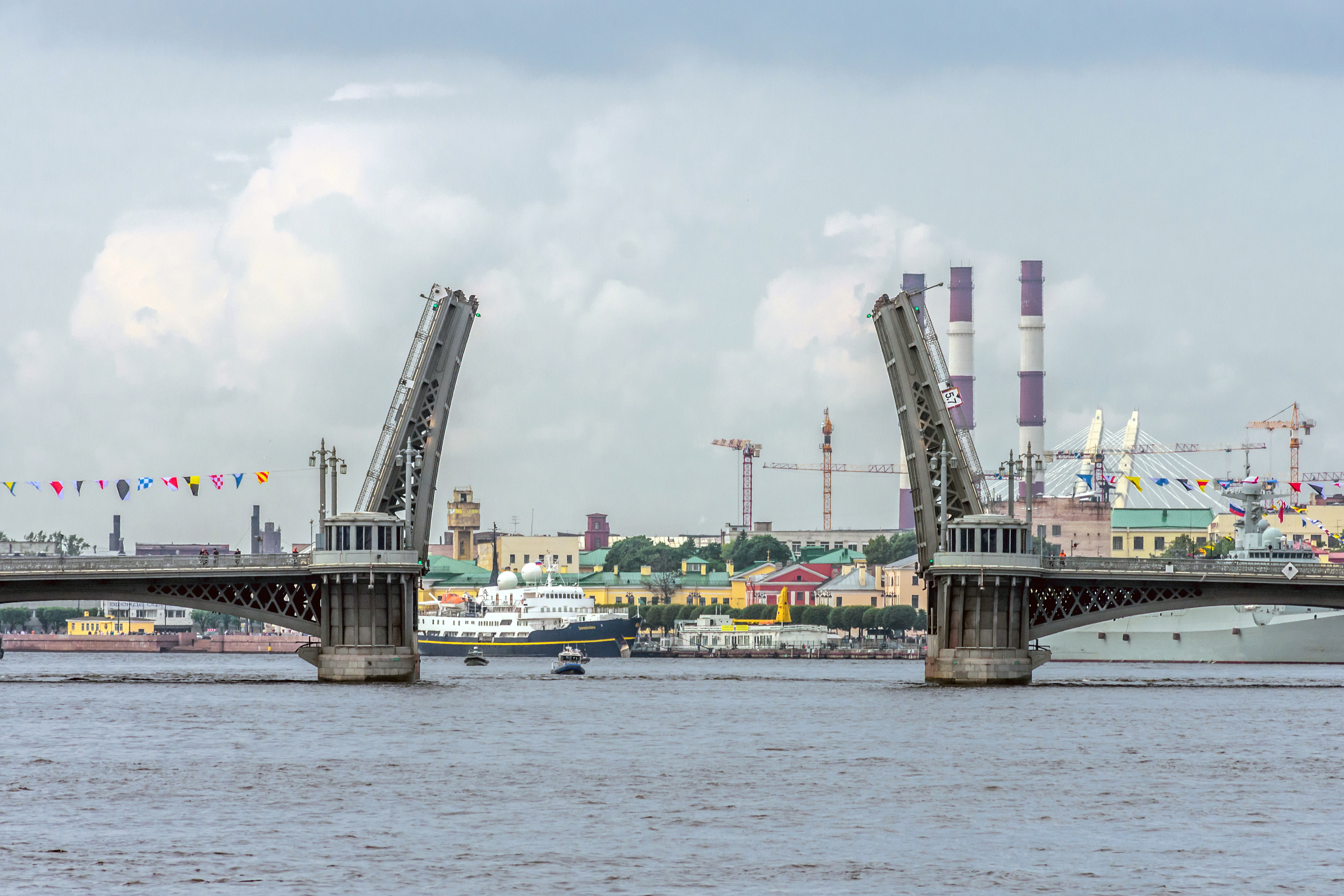
Annunciation Bridge with raised spans

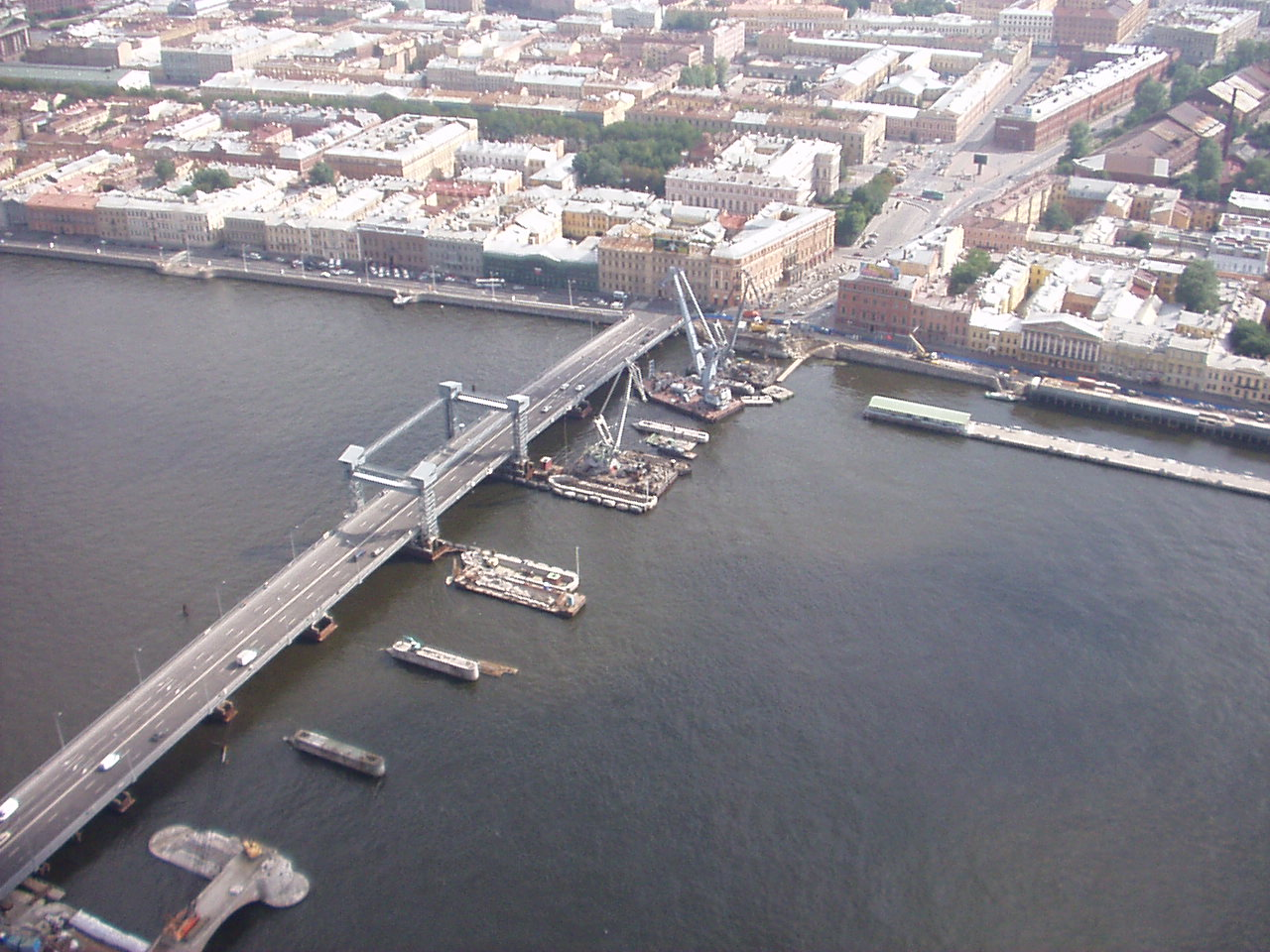
Temporary bridge next to dismantled Lieutenant Schmidt Bridge

In 1727, a temporary bridge was built at the location of the modern bridge. The place was chosen by Menshikov whose palace is located at the opposite bank. This bridge, named Issakievsky, existed until the current bridge was built, at which time it was moved to the location of where Palace Bridge is located today.

The bridge was built in 1843–1850. It was designed by Stanisław Kierbedź, a Polish engineer working in Russia. The architect Alexander Brullov participated in the decoration. The design was a cast iron bridge with twin parallel swing sections at its northern end. At the time, it was the longest bridge in Europe. According to the legend, the Emperor Nicholas I promised to Kierbedź to give him a promotion for every completed span. After the bridge was completed with eight spans total in it, Kierbedź was promoted to the rank of general, but actually when he started the construction he already had a rank of Podpolkovnik (i.e. lieutenant colonel).

The bridge was formally opened on November 12, 1850. Since it was close to Blagoveshchenskaya (Annunciation) Square, it was called Blagoveshchensky Bridge. In 1855, it was renamed Nikolayevsky Bridge in memory of Emperor Nicholas I. In 1918, after the revolution, it was renamed again, this time in memory of Pyotr Schmidt, a leader of the Sevastopol Uprising during the Russian Revolution of 1905.

In 2006, a reconstruction of the bridge began. Since it would be completely closed to traffic for over a year, a temporary bridge was constructed between September 2005 and May 2006. During the reconstruction all traffic, both pedestrian and motorized, moved across the temporary bridge. In May 2006 the Lieutenant Schmidt Bridge was closed to traffic, and the dismantling of the spans, and then, of bridge supports began. The reconstruction was completed on August 15, 2007, slightly over two years after work began. During reconstruction the deck was widened from 24 m to 37 m.

After reconstruction, the bridge was renamed Blagoveshchensky Bridge.

== See also ==
- List of bridges in Saint Petersburg
