= Valentin Kataev =

Soviet writer and editor (1897–1986)

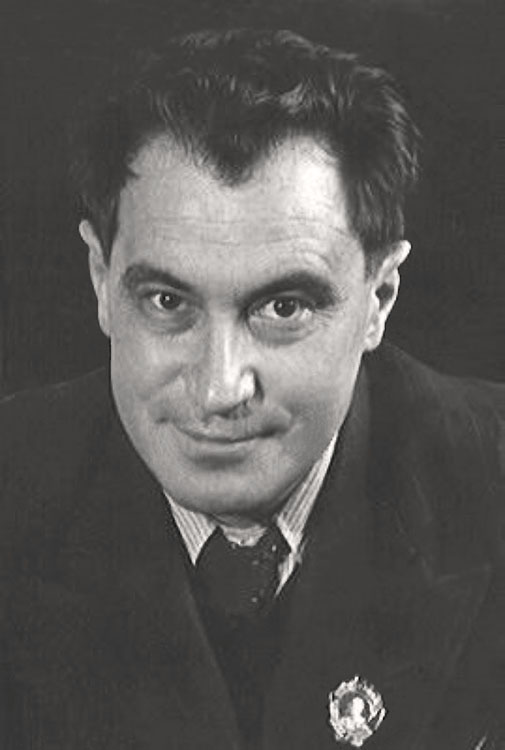
- Born: Valentin Petrovich Kataev; 28 January 1897; Odessa, Kherson Governorate, Russian Empire
- Died: 12 April 1986 (aged 89); Moscow, Russian SFSR, Soviet Union
- Resting place: Novodevichy Cemetery
- Occupations: Writer, dramatist, poet, editor, journalist, screenwriter
- Relatives: Yevgeny Petrov (brother)
- Writing career
- Notable awards: Hero of Socialist Labour
- Movements: Socialist realism Modernism

Valentin Petrovich Kataev (Russian: Валенти́н Петро́вич Ката́ев; also spelled Katayev or Kataiev; 28 January [O.S. 16 January] 1897 – 12 April 1986) was a Soviet writer and editor who managed to create penetrating works discussing post-revolutionary social conditions without running afoul of the demands of official Soviet style. Kataev is credited with suggesting the idea for The Twelve Chairs to his brother Yevgeny Petrov and Ilya Ilf. In return, Kataev insisted that the novel be dedicated to him, in all editions and translations. Kataev's relentless imagination, sensitivity, and originality made him one of the most distinguished Soviet writers.

== Life and works ==
Kataev was born in Odessa, Kherson Governorate, Russian Empire (now Ukraine) into the family of Pyotr Vasilyevich Kataev, a Court councillor and a teacher at the Odessa Female seminary, and Eugenia Ivanovna Bachei who belonged to a noble family of the Poltava Governorate. Thus it's no coincidence that the main character in Kataev's semi-autobiographical novel A White Sail Gleams is named Pyotr Bachei. His father came from a long line of Russian clergy originally from Vyatka where Valentin's grandfather served as a protoiereus. His maternal grandfather was a major general in the Imperial Russian Army. Despite the obvious class conflict, Kataev never tried to hide his origins during the Soviet period.

He began writing while he was still in secondary school. He was then a sympathizer of the Union of the Russian People and wrote nationalistic and anti-Semitic poetry (later in his life he married a Jewish woman, Esther Brenner (1913-2009)). He did not finish school, but volunteered for the army in 1915, serving in the artillery. After the October Revolution, he was mobilized into the Red Army, where he fought against Anton Denikin and served in the Russian Telegraph Agency. In 1920, he became a journalist in Odessa. He moved to Moscow in 1922, where he worked on the staff of The Whistle (Gudok), writing humorous pieces under various pseudonyms.

His first novel, The Embezzlers (Rastratchiki, 1926), was printed in the journal Krasnaya Nov. In the satire of the new Soviet bureaucracy in the tradition of Nikolai Gogol, the protagonists are two bureaucrats "who more or less by instinct or by accident conspire to defraud the Soviet state". The novel was well received, and the seminal modernist theatre practitioner Konstantin Stanislavski asked Kataev to adapt it for the stage. It was produced at the Moscow Art Theatre, opening on 20 April 1928. A cinematic adaptation under the title The Virtuous Sinner was filmed in 1931.

His comedy Squaring the Circle (Kvadratura kruga, 1928) satirizes the effect of the housing shortage on two married couples who share a room.

His novel Time, Forward! (Vremya, vperyod!, 1932) describes workers' attempts to build the huge steel plant at Magnitogorsk in record time. "The title...was taken from a poem by Mayakovsky, and its theme is the speeding up of time in the Soviet Union where the historical development of a century must be completed in ten years." The heroes are described as "being unable to trust such a valuable thing as time, to clocks, mere mechanical devices." Kataev adapted it into a screenplay, which was released as the eponymously titled film in 1965.

A White Sail Gleams (Beleyet parus odinoky, 1936) treats the Russian Revolution of 1905 and the Potemkin uprising from the viewpoint of two Odessa schoolboys. In 1937, Vladimir Legoshin directed a film version, which became a classic children's adventure. Kataev wrote its screenplay and took an active part in the filming process, finding locations and acting as a historical advisor. Many of his contemporaries considered the novel to be a prose poem.

During the 1950s and 1960s Kataev edited the magazine Yunost (Youth), publishing some of the most promising literary talent of the young generation, including Yevgeny Yevtushenko and Bella Akhmadulina.

During the second half of the 1960s, Kataev began moving away from official socialist realism, developing his own modernist style, "Mauvism" (from the French word mauvais, "bad").

Kataev himself developed a style he called "lyrical diary," mixing autobiography and fiction. In 1966 the literary magazine Novy Mir printed his The Grass of Oblivion (Trava zabveniya), which was published under the title The Holy Well (Svyatoy kolodets: Trava zabveniya) two years later. In it, Kataev weaves scenes from the lives of his family, friends, and lovers, events of Soviet history, and memories of his travels in America into a kind of stream-of-consciousness autobiography, considered by some critics to be the summary work of his career. Dodona Kiziria describes this work as "a tribute to the Russian writers who were forced to choose their path during the revolution and the civil war", adding that "in all of Soviet literature it would be difficult to find tragic images comparable to the two poets in this narrative (Bunin and Mayakovsky) who are compelled, finally and irrevocably, either to accept or reject the role offered to them by the new social order".

Kataev was proud of being a Soviet writer, and related the following account.

Returning home one day, a long time ago, I found an envelope with foreign stamps on it in my mail box. Inside the envelope, there was an invitation from the Pen Club, an international literary association, to attend its next conference, in Vienna. I was a young writer then, and was greatly flattered. I told everyone I met about the remarkable honor that had been accorded me. When I ran into Vladimir Mayakovsky in one of the editorial offices, I showed him the letter from abroad. He calmly produced an elegant envelope exactly like mine from the pocket of his jacket. "Look," he said. "They invited me too, but I'm not bragging about this. Because they did not invite me, of course, as Mayakovsky, but as a representative of the Soviet literature. The same applies to you. Get it? Reflect, Kataich (as he called me when he was in a good mood), on what it means to be a writer in the Land of Soviets." Mayakovsky's words made a lasting impression on me. I realized that I owed my success as a creative writer to the Soviet people, who had backed me. I realized that being a Soviet writer meant marching in synch with the people, being always on the crest of revolutionary wave.

Dodona Kiziria describes Kataev as "one of the most brilliant writers of modern Russia. Of the authors writing in Russian, only Nabokov could be considered a worthy rival in his ability to convey with almost cinematic precision the images of visually perceived reality.

== English translations ==
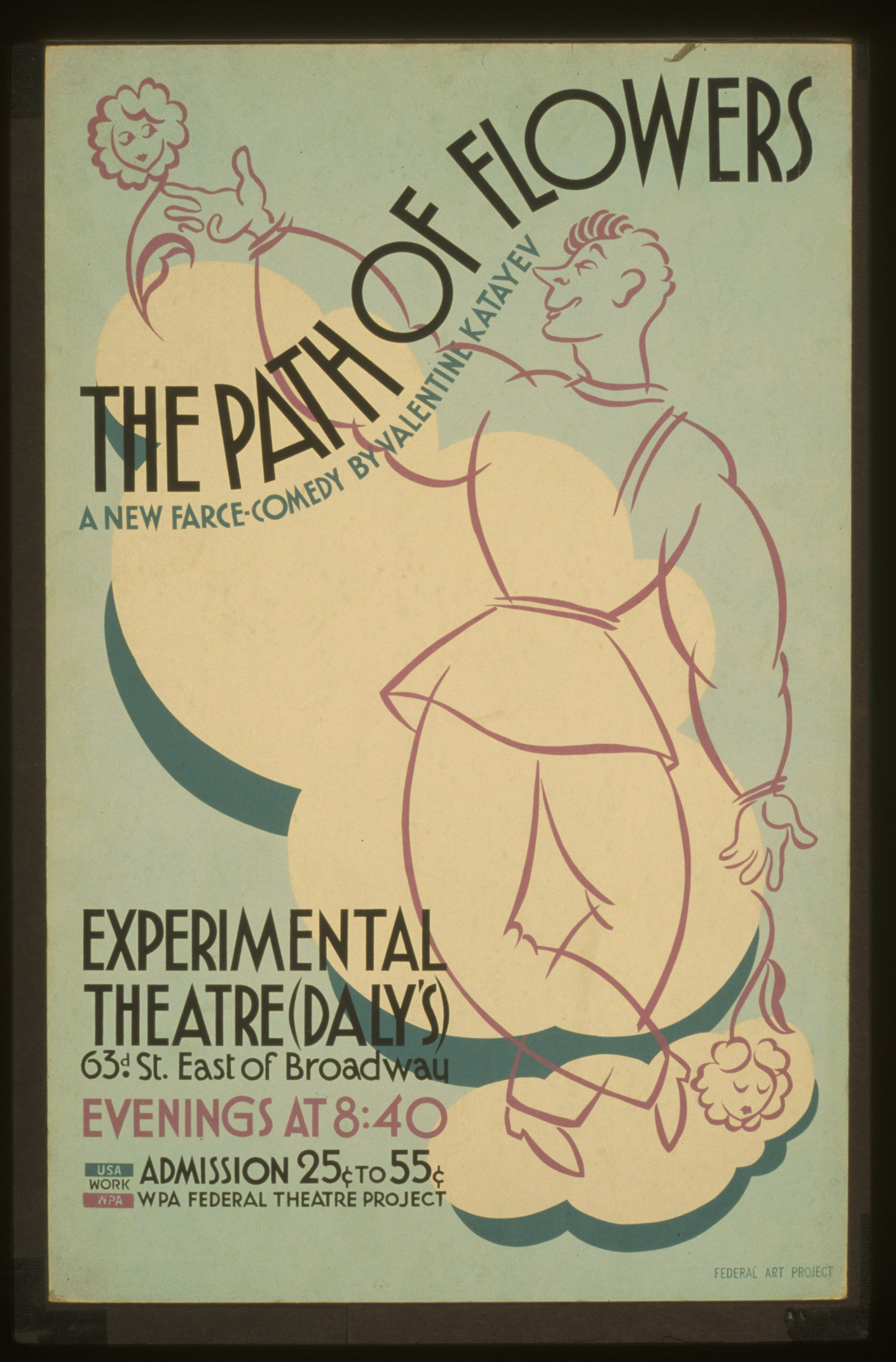
Poster for the Federal Theatre Project production of The Path of Flowers (1936)

- The Embezzlers (novel), Dial Press, 1929.
- Squaring the Circle (play), Samuel French, 1936.
- Peace is Where the Tempests Blow (novel), Farrar & Rinehart, 1937.
- The Blue Handkerchief (play), University of California Press, 1944.
- The Small Farm in the Steppe (novel), Lawrence & Wishart, 1958.
- A White Sail Gleams (novel), Foreign Languages Publishing House, Moscow, 1954.
- "Our Father Who Art in Heaven" (story), in Great Soviet Short Stories, Dell, 1962.
- "The Beautiful Trousers", "The Suicide", "A Goat in the Orchard" and "The Struggle Unto Death" (stories), in The Fatal Eggs and Other Soviet Satire, Macmillan, NY, 1965.
- The Holy Well, Harvill, 1967.
- The Grass of Oblivion (memoirs), McGraw-Hill, 1970.
- Mosaic of Life (memoirs), The Book Service Ltd, 1976.
- "The Sleeper" (story), in The New Soviet Fiction, Abbeville Press, 1989.
- Time, Forward! (novel), Northwestern University Press, 1995.

== Family ==
He was the brother of the writer Yevgeny Petrov.

He was married twice, first to Anna Kovalenko in 1923 and second to Esther Brenner in 1935; he and Esther had two children.

== Sources ==
- Benedetti, Jean. 1999. Stanislavski: His Life and Art. Revised edition. Original edition published in 1988. London: Methuen. ISBN 0-413-52520-1.
- Brown, Edward J. (1982) [1963]. Russian Literature Since the Revolution (Rev. ed.). Cambridge, Ma; London: Harvard University Press. pp. 101–2, 341–2. ISBN 0-674-78203-8.
- Kiziria, Dodona. 1985. "Four Demons of Valentin Kataev." Slavic Review 44.4 (Winter): 647-662.
- Merriam-Webster's Encyclopedia of Literature (1995), p. 623
- Seymour-Smith, Martin. 1973. Funk & Wagnalls Guide to Modern World Literature. 951.
