= Sergei Yursky =

Soviet Russian film actor and screenwriter (1935–2019)

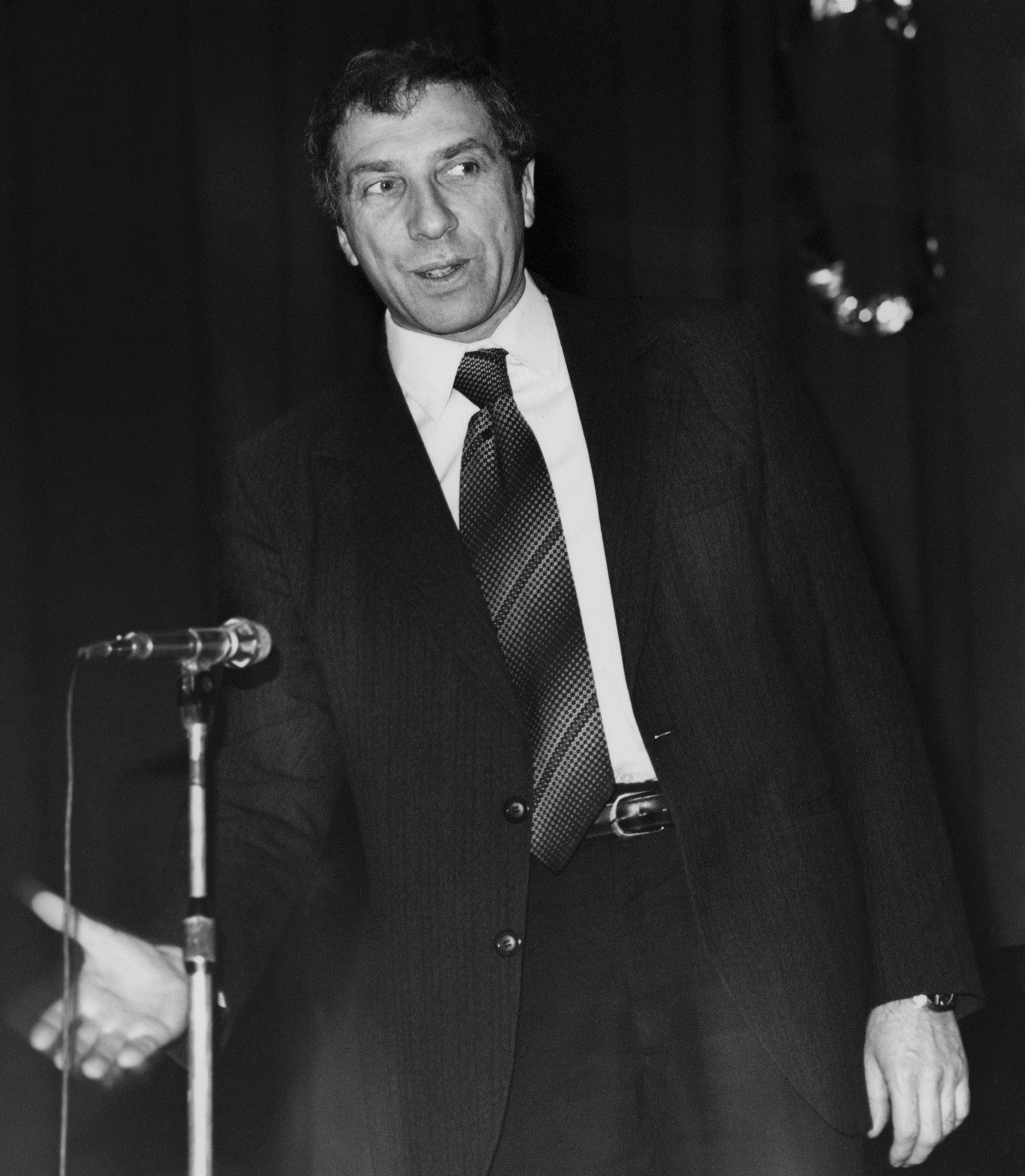
- Yursky in 1986
- Born: Sergei Yurievich Yursky; 16 March 1935; Leningrad, Soviet Union
- Died: 8 February 2019 (aged 83); Moscow, Russia
- Occupations: actor, film director, screenwriter
- Years active: 1957–2019
- Spouse(s): Zinaida Sharko (m.1961–d.1968); Natalya Tenyakova (m. 1970)
- Awards

Sergei Yurievich Yursky (Russian: Серге́й Ю́рьевич Ю́рский, 16 March 1935 – 8 February 2019) was a Soviet and Russian stage and film actor, theatre director and screenwriter. His best-known film role is Ostap Bender in The Golden Calf (1968)

== Biography ==
Yursky was born in Leningrad, USSR, on 16 March 1935 to the family of Yuri Sergeyevich Yursky. He studied at the Faculty of Law of Zhdanov Leningrad State University.

In 1959 he graduated from Ostrovsky Leningrad Theatrical Institute, Leonid Makaryev's course. After completing his second year, in 1957, he was invited to the Gorky Bolshoi Drama Theater.

From 1957 to 1979 he was one of the leading actors of Gorky Bolshoi Drama Theater in Leningrad. The leading part in Wit Works Woe (1962) by Alexander Griboedov made him one of the most significant actors of his generation. His director's debut, Moliere (also known as The Cabal of Hypocrites), by Mikhail Bulgakov in 1977 was highly acclaimed, but was not accepted by Georgy Tovstonogov and led to Yursky's departure from the theatre.

His first major film role was Chudak in the film The Man from Nowhere (1961). The actor gained wide fame for his roles as Vicknicksor in the film The Republic of ShKID (1966) and Ostap Bender in The Little Golden Calf (1968).

From 1979, he was an actor and director of Mossovet Theater in Moscow. He also worked as an actor and director in Moscow Art Theatre, as well as in Belgium, France and Japan.

Yursky performed one-man recitals of poetry and prose, touring widely with them in the USSR, then Russia and beginning in the 1990s many countries with a Russian-speaking population.

From 1961 to 1968, Yursky was married to actress Zinaida Sharko. From his second marriage, he had a daughter, Daria Yurskaya, who became an actress at the Moscow Chekhov Art Theatre.

On 8 February 2019, the actor felt unwell while at home. By the time the ambulance arrived, he had died.

A civil memorial service was held on February 11 at the Mossovet Theater. He was buried at the Troyekurovskoye Cemetery.

On 8 February 2021, a monument was erected on the actor's grave.

== Partial filmography ==
- 1961: The Man from Nowhere as Chudak
- 1963: The Serf Actress as Prince Nikita Petrovich Baturin
- 1965: Time, Forward! as Margulies
- 1966: The Republic of ShKID as Vicknicksor
- 1968: The Little Golden Calf as Ostap Bender
- 1969: Intervention as Masks
- 1969: King Stag as Tartaglia
- 1976: The Darvish Detonates Paris as Musje Jordan
- 1979: The Meeting Place Cannot Be Changed (TV Mini-Series) as Gruzdev
- 1979: Little Tragedies (TV Mini-Series) as Improviser
- 1983: Look for a Woman (TV Movie) as notary Rochet
- 1984: Love and Pigeons as Uncle Mitya
- 1987: The End of Eternity as Computer Hobbe Finge
- 2006: Master and Margarita as Berlioz (voice, uncredited)
- 2007: Korolyov as Konstantin Tsiolkovsky

== Awards ==
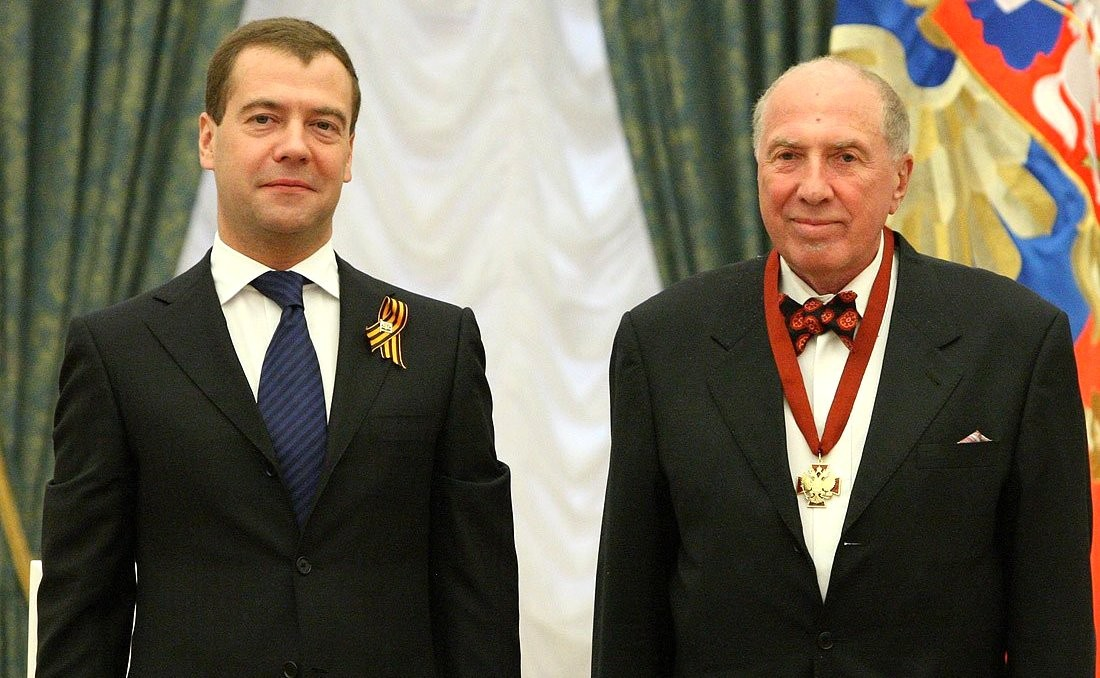
Presentation of the Order "For Merit to the Fatherland", 3rd class with President Dmitry Medvedev, 6 May 2010

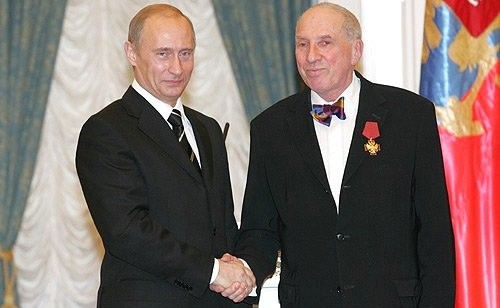
Presentation of the Order "For Merit to the Fatherland", 4th class with President Vladimir Putin, 21 December 2005

- 1968: Honored Artist of the RSFSR
- 1987: People's Artist of the RSFSR
- 1991: Kinotavr Grand Prize in feature films
- 1995: Order of Honour
- 2000: Pushkin Medal
- 2005: Order "For Merit to the Fatherland", 4th class
- 2010: Order "For Merit to the Fatherland", 3rd class
