= Ilf and Petrov =

Soviet writing duo

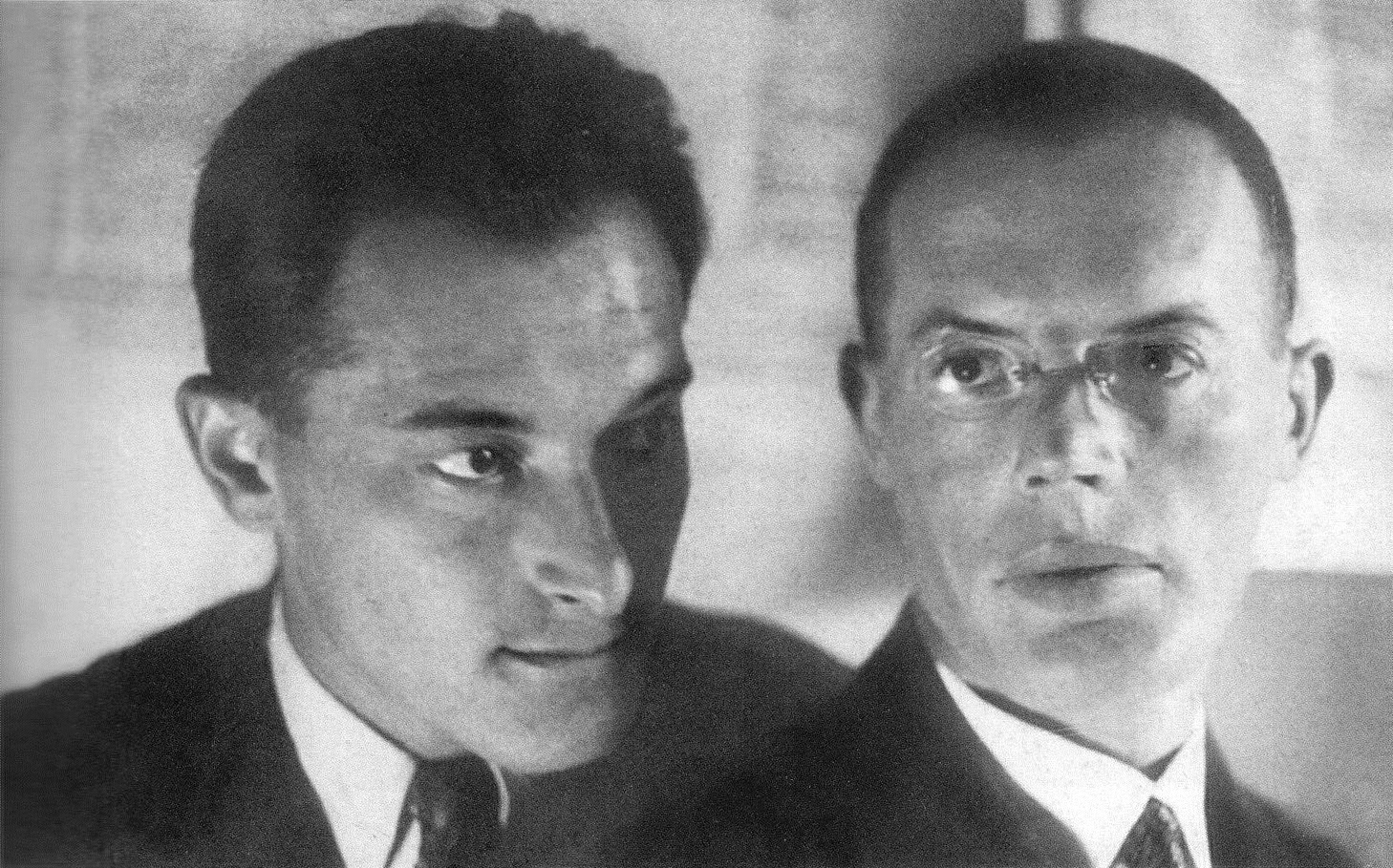
- Petrov and Ilf, 1929
- Born: Ilf: Iehiel-Leyb Aryevich Feinsilberg; 15 October [O.S. 3 October] 1897; Petrov: Yevgeny Petrovich Katayev; 13 December [O.S. 30 November] 1902; Odessa, Russian Empire (now Odesa, Ukraine)
- Died: Ilf: 13 April 1937; Moscow, Soviet Union (now Russia); Petrov: 2 July 1942; Rostov Oblast, Soviet Union (now Russia)
- Occupations: Novelists, short story writers
- Writing career
- Notable works: The Twelve Chairs; The Little Golden Calf; One-storied America

Ilya Ilf (Ilya Arnoldovich Feinsilberg or Russian: Илья Арнольдович Файнзильберг, 1897–1937) and Yevgeny Petrov (Yevgeniy Petrovich Katayev or Russian: Евгений Петрович Катаев, 1902–1942) were two Soviet prose authors of the 1920s and 1930s. They did much of their writing together, and are almost always referred to as "Ilf and Petrov". They were natives of Odessa.

The duo were arguably the most popular satirical writers in the Soviet period, representatives of the "Odessa School" of humorist writers, and some of the very prominent, mostly Jewish odessit (Odessa native) cultural figures along with Isaac Babel and Leonid Utesov, who moved to work in the Soviet capital after the abolition of restrictions on Jewish residence in the Pale of Settlement.

== Publications ==
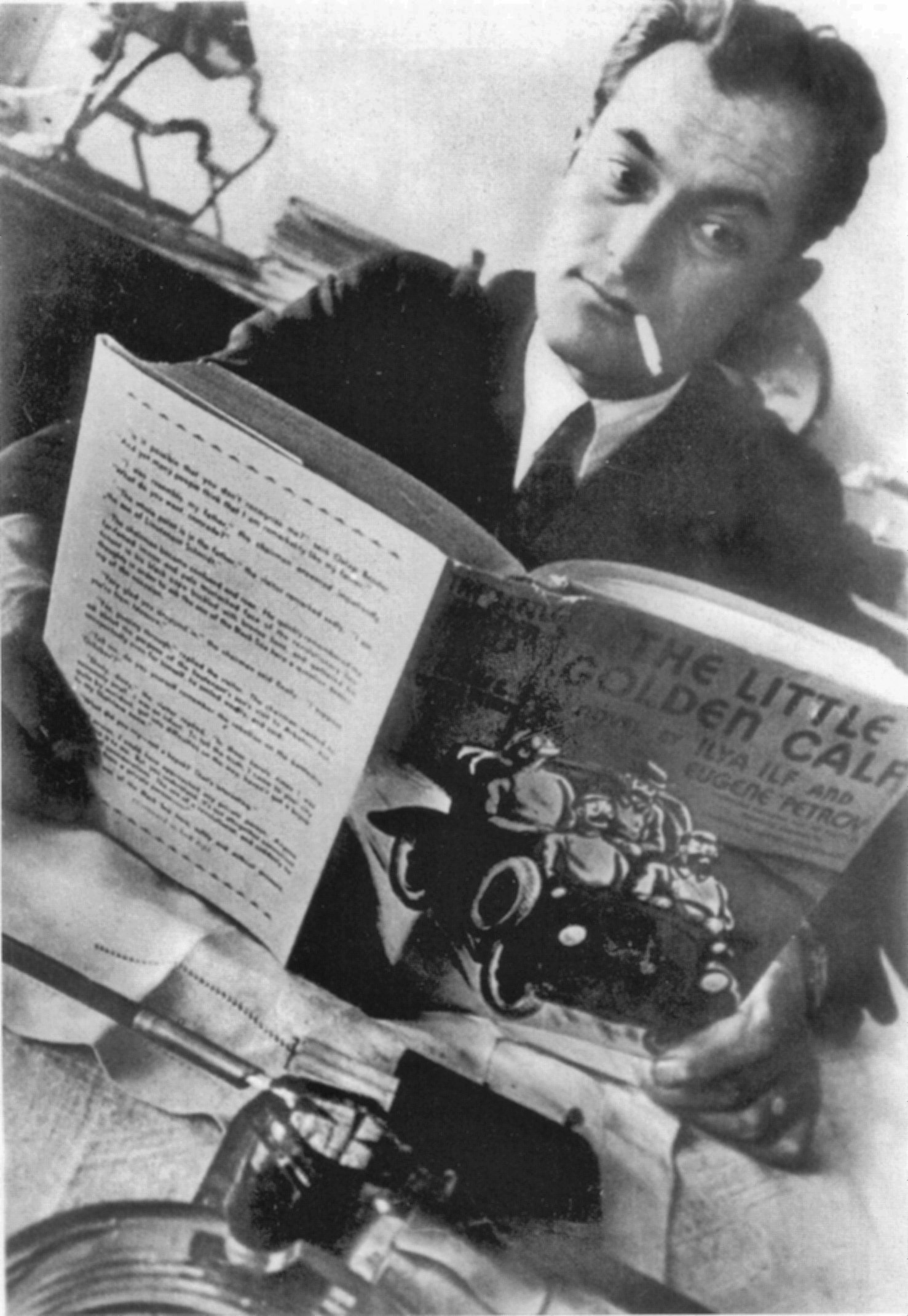
Evgeny Petrov reads the novel The Golden Calf in English translation

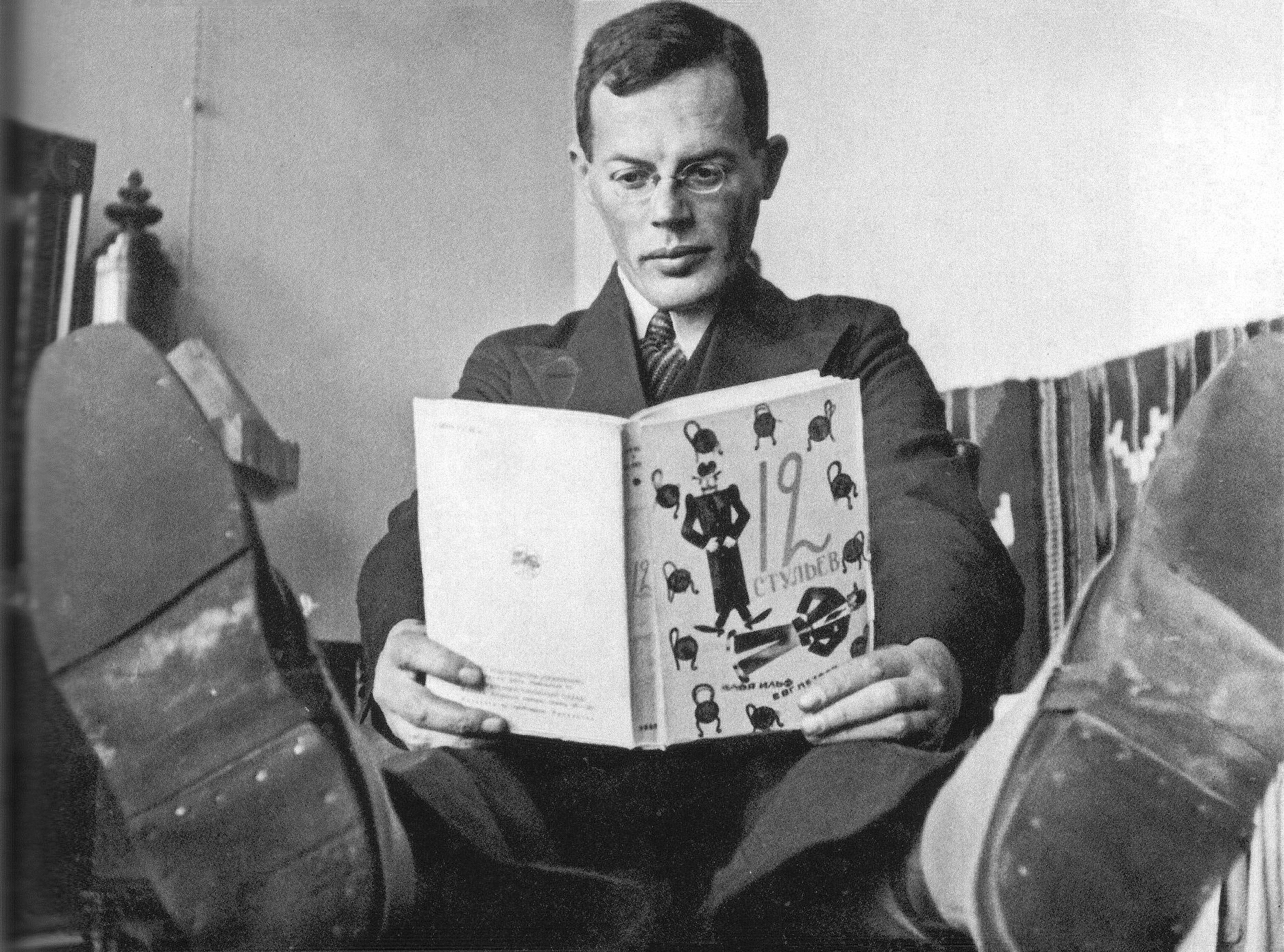
Ilya Ilf reads the novel The Twelve Chairs

Ilf and Petrov gained a high profile for their two satirical novels: The Twelve Chairs (1928) and its sequel, The Little Golden Calf (1931). The two texts are connected by their main character, Ostap Bender, a con man in pursuit of elusive riches. Both books follow exploits of Bender and his associates looking for treasure amidst the contemporary Soviet reality. They were written and are set in the relatively liberal era in Soviet history, the New Economic Policy of the 1920s. The main characters generally avoid contact with the apparently lax law enforcement. Their position outside the organized, goal-driven, productive Soviet society is emphasized. It also gives the authors a convenient platform from which to look at this society and to make fun of its less attractive and less Socialist aspects. These are among the most widely read and quoted books in Russian culture. The Twelve Chairs was adapted for ca. twenty movies; in the Soviet Union (by Leonid Gaidai and by Mark Zakharov), in the US (in particular by Mel Brooks) and in other countries.

From the late 1920s to 1937, the co-authors wrote several theatrical plays and screenplays, as well as many humorous short stories and satirical articles in the magazines Chudak, 30 days, Krokodil and Ogoniok; and the newspapers Pravda and Literaturnaya Gazeta. In the first years of joint creativity Ilf and Petrov published their stories and satires under parodic pseudonyms: Tolstoevsky (composed of the names of writers Tolstoy and Dostoevsky), Don Busilio (from Don Basilio, a character in the opera The Barber of Seville, and the Russian verb busa – scandal, noise), Cold philosopher and others.

The two writers also traveled across the Great Depression-era United States. Ilf took many pictures throughout the journey, and the authors produced a photo essay entitled "American Photographs", published in Ogoniok magazine. Shortly after that they published the book Одноэтажная Америка (literally: "One-storied America"), translated as Little Golden America (an allusion to The Little Golden Calf). The first edition of the book did not include Ilf's photographs. Both the photo essay and the book document their adventures with their characteristic humor and playfulness. Notably, Ilf and Petrov were not afraid to praise many aspects of the American lifestyle in these works while being highly critical of others. The title comes from the following description.

America is primarily a one-and two-storey country. The majority of the American population lives in small towns of three thousand, maybe five, nine, or fifteen thousand inhabitants.

Vladimir Nabokov considered them to be "wonderfully gifted writers".

Ilf died of tuberculosis a few months after their return from the USA. Petrov became a front line correspondent during the Second World War and, after covering the fighting in Sevastopol, was killed when the airplane he was travelling in back to Moscow crashed while flying low to avoid anti-aircraft fire.

== Script authors ==
- Woman-Sycophant – comic play (1930, “Подхалимка”)
- House-Barracks – screenplay (1931, “Барак”)
- Strong Feeling – vaudeville (1933, “Сильное чувство”)
- Under the Circus Dome – comic play (1934, with Valentin Kataev, “Под куполом цирка”)

== In culture ==
The minor planet 3668 Ilfpetrov, discovered by Soviet astronomer Lyudmila Georgievna Karachkina in 1982, is named after them.

== Bibliography ==
- Двенадцать стульев [The Twelve Chairs] (in Russian), 1928
  - The Twelve Chairs, Northwestern University Press, 1997, ISBN 0-8101-1484-4
- Золотой теленок [The Little Golden Calf], 1931
- Одноэтажная Америка [One-storied America], 1937
  - Ilf, Ilya; Petrov, Eugene (1974) [1937], Little Golden America, Ishi Press International, ISBN 4871876748
- Shrayer, Maxim D. (2018). "Ilya Ilf (1897–1937) and Evgeny Petrov (1903–1942)". Voices of Jewish-Russian Literature: an Anthology. Academic Studies Press. pp. 349–362. ISBN 978-1-61811-792-2. OCLC 1121369372.
- Smith, Alexandra (2003). "Il'ia Il'f (15 October 1897-13 April 1937) and Evgenii Petrov (13 December 1903-2 July 1942)". In Rydel, Christine (ed.). Russian prose writers between the world wars. Dictionary of Literary Biography. Vol. 272. Gale. OCLC 941455049.
- Wolf, Erika, ed. (2006). Ilf & Petrov's American Road Trip: The 1935 Travelogue of Two Soviet Writers. Translated by Fisher, Anne O. New York: Cabinet Books and Princeton Architectural Press. ISBN 1-56898-600-9. (A translation of the eleven-part "American Photographs" photo-essay originally published in Ogoniok)
