= Literaturnaya gazeta =

Russian newspaper

- Type: Weekly newspaper
- Founded: 1830, 1929
- Ceased publication: 1849 (see main text)
- Website: lgz.ru

Literaturnaya gazeta (Russian: Литературная газета, Literary Gazette) is a weekly cultural and political newspaper published in Russia and the Soviet Union. It was published for two periods in the 19th century, and was revived in 1929.

== Overview ==
The current newspaper shares its title with a 19th century publication, and claims to be a continuation of the original publication. The first paper to bear the name of Literaturnaya gazeta was founded by a literary group led by Anton Delvig and Alexander Pushkin, whose profile to this day adorns the paper's masthead. The first issue appeared on January 1, 1830. The paper appeared regularly until June 30, 1831, reappearing in 1840–1849. Pushkin himself published some of his most famous works in this paper. Literaturnaya gazeta was the first to publish Gogol, and published works by Baratynsky, Belinsky, Nekrasov and many other Russian authors.

After the Russian Revolution, the Soviet literary establishment decided to resume the venture on April 22, 1929, and the paper has been published regularly ever since. From 1929 to 1932, Literaturnaya gazeta was the official organ of the Federation of Unions of Soviet Writers, which had as its stated aim "to foster in the area of creative writing the principle of free competition of the various groupings and tendencies". In 1932, however, Literaturnaya gazeta became the official organ of the Union of Soviet Writers, the government-controlled organization responsible for most literary publication and employment of writers in the USSR.

An issue from 1950

A 2005 issue

In 1947, the format of Literaturnaya gazeta was changed from a purely literary publication into a newspaper with political and social content as well. It was published weekly in an edition of sixteen pages, the first "thick newspaper" in a country where most newspapers were four to eight pages in length. The expanded newspaper not only took on a new look, but also acquired greater influence, becoming one of the most authoritative and influential publications. Though Literaturnaya gazeta, like all newspapers during the Soviet period, faithfully reflected government policy (both political and literary), it showed, as much as possible, the human face of Soviet society, and was the national paper most likely to "push the limits" (though those limits were fairly severe). Likely over the limit covering Eastern Siberia in 1958 on October 21 "In Defense of Baikal" from Frants Taurin appeared, which brought the regional environmental conflict to the national press. Most interesting to its readers were reports on the international political scene, and especially on cultural life in countries outside the Soviet sphere of influence.

Especially popular was the last page of each issue, which contained a variety of satirical articles and cartoons under the rubric "Twelve Chairs Club" (an allusion to the well-known comic novel by Ilf and Petrov). Under the protective guise of good-natured, constructive satire, various frustrating and unsavory aspects of Soviet life could be discussed that were scarcely acknowledged in other publications.

In 1990, with the end of the Soviet Union, the newspaper became an independent collective, and in 1997 formed itself into a publicly traded company.
