= The Embezzlers =

1926 novel by Valentin Kataev

- Author: Valentin Katayev
- Original title: Растратчики
- Language: Russian
- Publisher: 1926 (Krasnaya Nov)
- Publication place: Soviet Union
- Media type: Print (hardback & paperback)

The Embezzlers (Russian: Растратчики, romanized: Rastratchiki) is a 1926 satirical novel by Valentin Katayev first published in the October-December (Nos. 10, 11, 12) issues of Krasnaya Nov magazine. The play of the same name, based upon the novel and written in 1927, premiered in 1928 at the Moscow Art Theatre.

== Background ==
Inspired by the Communist Party-instigated campaign against corruption and economical crimes, the story was based upon the real life stories Katayev had read in the periodicals he contributed to, like Krokodil, Rabochaya Gazeta, Smekhach and Krasny Perets (Red Pepper).

Katayev started working upon the novel in December 1925, although a 1925 short story titled "Grim Accident" (Мрачный случай), published in the No.26 issue of Smekhach magazine, is considered to be its direct precursor, containing the embryo of a storyline. In August 1926 the novel was finished.

== Synopsis ==
The accountant Filipp Stepanovich, cashier Vanechka and courier Nikita fall victim to the latest embezzlement 'epidemic' that had swept 90 per cent of the Moscow commercial institutions. They steal 12 thousand rubles which they'd been supposed to deliver from the bank to their firm, and embark upon a massive spree which takes them first to Leningrad, then to the Russian South and finally, penniless, back to Moscow, straight to jail.

== Theatre production ==
"The Embezzlers endorsed me as part of a literary mainstream, marking the beginning of the whole new life for me. I received a phone call from the Stanislavski quarters and was asked to write a play based upon the Embezzlers...", Katayev remembered in 1948. In 1927 the Moscow Art Theatre started working upon the production, directed by Nikolai Gorchakov. In 1928 the play premiered to considerable critical acclaim. Among the actors engaged in it were the theatre's rising young stars: Mikhail Tarkhanov as the accountant Prokhorov, Vasily Toporkov as the cashier Vanechka and Nikolai Batalov as Nikita the courier.

A German version by Alfred Polgar was also successful in Berlin and was adapted into the film The Virtuous Sinner (1931).
