= List of Spanish films of 2002 =

A list of Spanish-produced and co-produced feature films released in Spain in 2002. When applicable, the domestic theatrical release date is favoured.

== Films ==
Release		Title (Native title)	Cast & Crew	Ref.
J A N U A R Y	11	My Mother Likes Women (A mi madre le gustan las mujeres)	Director: Inés París & Daniela Fejerman Cast: Rosa María Sardà, Leonor Watling, Silvia Abascal, María Pujalte, Eliska Sirova	
J A N U A R Y	25	Reflections (Reflejos)	Director: Miguel Ángel Vivas Cast: Georges Corraface, Emilio Gutiérrez Caba, Ana Fernández, Carlos Kaniowsky, Alberto Jiménez, Magüi Mira	
F E B R U A R Y	1	Chicken Skin (Carne de gallina)	Director: Javier Maqua Cast: Karra Elejalde, Anabel Alonso, Nathalie Seseña, Amparo Valle, Txema Blasco, Maxi Rodríguez	
F E B R U A R Y	8	Stones (Piedras)	Director: Ramón Salazar Cast: Antonia San Juan, Mónica Cervera, Najwa Nimri, Ángela Molina, Vicky Peña, Lola Dueñas, Enrique Alcides, Daniele Liotti	
F E B R U A R Y	15	Antigua, My Life (Antigua vida mía)	Director: Héctor Olivera Cast: Ana Belén, Cecilia Roth, Jorge Marrale	
M A R C H	1	In the City Without Limits (En la ciudad sin límites)	Director: Antonio Hernández Cast: Leonardo Sbaraglia, Fernando Fernán Gómez, Geraldine Chaplin, Ana Fernández, Adriana Ozores, Leticia Brédice, Roberto Álvarez, Àlex Casanovas, Mónica Estarreado, Alfredo Alcón	
M A R C H	15	Talk to Her (Hable con ella)	Director: Pedro Almodóvar Cast: Javier Cámara, Darío Grandinetti, Leonor Watling, Rosario Flores, Geraldine Chaplin	
M A R C H	22	Guerreros	Director: Daniel Calparsoro Cast: Eloy Azorín, Eduardo Noriega, Rubén Ochandiano, Carla Pérez, Jordi Vilches, Roger Casamajor, Iñaki Font, Sandra Wahlbeck, Olivier Sitruk, Roman Luknár	
M A R C H	22	El florido pensil	Director: Juan José Porto Cast: Fernando Guillén, Jorge Sanz, Emilio Gutiérrez Caba	
M A R C H	27	In This Tricky Life (En la puta vida)	Director: Beatriz Flores Silva Cast: Mariana Santángelo, Andrea Fantoni, Silvestre, Fermí Herrero, Josep Linuesa, Martha Gularte	
A P R I L	12	The Shanghai Spell (El embrujo de Shanghai)	Director: Fernando Trueba Cast: Aida Folch, Fernando Tielve, Ariadna Gil, Jorge Sanz, Antonio Resines, Rosa Maria Sardà, Eduard Fernández, Fernando Fernán Gómez	
A P R I L	12	Balseros	Director: Carles Bosch, Josep Maria Domènech (documentary)	
A P R I L	26	Lola vende cá	Director: Llorenç Soler Cast: Cristina Brondo, Miguel El Toleo, Carmen Muñoz, Antonio Reyes	
M A Y	10	La soledad era esto	Director: Sergio Renán Cast: Charo López, Iñaki Font, Ramón Langa, Ingrid Rubio, Ana Fernández, Carlos Hipólito, Álvaro de Luna, Kira Miró	
M A Y	17	The Impatient Alchemist (El alquimista impaciente)	Director: Patricia Ferreira (director) Cast: Roberto Enríquez, Ingrid Rubio, Adriana Ozores, Miguel Ángel Solá, Chete Lera, Mariana Santángelo	
M A Y	17	Everything in Place (Cuando todo esté en orden)	Director: César Martínez Herrada Cast: Santiago Ramos, Daniel Guzmán, Miguel Rellán, Cristina Plazas, Mario Zorrilla, Antonio Dechent	
M A Y	24	No debes estar aquí	Director: Jacobo Rispa Cast: Pablo Echarri, Tristán Ulloa, Marián Aguilera, Pilar Punzano, Andrés Gertrúdix, Juan Díaz	
M A Y	31	Rancour (Rencor)	Director: Miguel Albaladejo Cast: Lolita, Jorge Perugorría, Elena Anaya	
J U N E	14	Smoking Room	Director: Roger Gual, Julio Wallovits Cast: Eduard Fernández, Juan Diego, Chete Lera, Antonio Dechent, Manuel Morón, Francesc Orella, Ulises Dumont, Francesc Garrido, Vicky Peña, Pep Molina	
J U N E	14	X	Director: Luis Marías Cast: Antonio Resines, Esperanza Roy, María Adánez, Manuel Galiana, Pere Arquillué, Marta Belaustegui	
J U L Y	5	The Other Side of the Bed (El otro lado de la cama)	Director: Emilio Martínez Lázaro Cast: Paz Vega, Natalia Verbeke, Alberto San Juan, Ernesto Alterio, María Esteve, Guillermo Toledo	
J U L Y	5	The Dark Side of the Heart 2 (El lado oscuro del corazón 2)	Director: Eliseo Subiela Cast: Darío Grandinetti, Ariadna Gil	
J U L Y	5	L'amore imperfetto (El amor imperfecto)	Director: Giovanni Davide Maderna Cast: Enrico Lo Verso, Marta Belaustegui	
A U G U S T	23	Box 507 (La caja 507)	Director: Enrique Urbizu Cast: Antonio Resines, José Coronado, Goya Toledo, Dafne Fernández, Juan Fernández, Luciano Federico, Miriam Montilla, Sancho Gracia	
S E P T E M B E R	6	The Virgin of Lust (La virgen de la lujuria)	Director: Arturo Ripstein Cast: Ariadna Gil, Luis Felipe Tovar, Juan Diego, Julián Pastor	
S E P T E M B E R	13	Lisístrata	Director: Francesc Bellmunt Cast: Maribel Verdú, Juan Luis Galiardo, Javier Gurruchaga, Teté Delgado, Sergio Pazos, Carles Flavià, José Corbacho, Jesús Bonilla, Santi Millán	
S E P T E M B E R	13	Poniente	Director: Chus Gutiérrez Cast: Cuca Escribano, José Coronado, Mariola Fuentes, Antonio Dechent, Farid Fatmi	
S E P T E M B E R	20	They're Watching Us (Nos miran)	Director: Norberto López Amado Cast: Carmelo Gómez, Icíar Bollaín, Massimo Ghini	
S E P T E M B E R	27	Mondays in the Sun (Los lunes al sol)	Director: Fernando León de Aranoa Cast: Javier Bardem, Luis Tosar	
O C T O B E R	4	Common Ground (Lugares comunes)	Director: Adolfo Aristarain Cast: Federico Luppi, Mercedes Sampietro, Arturo Puig, Carlos Santamaría, Yael Barnatán, Javier Ortiz, Guillermo Ayus	
O C T O B E R	4	You'll Be Back (Volverás)	Director: Antonio Chavarrías Cast: Unax Ugalde, Tristán Ulloa, Elizabeth Cervantes, Joana Rañé	
O C T O B E R	11	Darkness	Director: Jaume Balagueró Cast: Anna Paquin, Lena Olin, Iain Glen, Giancarlo Giannini, Fele Martínez, Fermí Reixach	
O C T O B E R	18	800 Bullets (800 balas)	Director: Álex de la Iglesia Cast: Sancho Gracia, Carmen Maura, Ángel de Andrés López, Eusebio Poncela, Luis Castro, Enrique Martínez, Luciano Federico, Ramón Barea	
O C T O B E R	25	Desire (Deseo)	Director: Gerardo Vera Cast: Leonor Watling, Leonardo Sbaraglia, Cecilia Roth, Ernesto Alterio, Rosa María Sardá, Norma Aleandro	
O C T O B E R	25	Story of a Kiss (Historia de un beso)	Director: José Luis Garci Cast: Alfredo Landa, Ana Fernández, Carlos Hipólito, Agustín González	
O C T O B E R	31	The Suit (El traje)	Director: Alberto Rodríguez Cast: Jimmy Roca, Manuel Morón, Vanesa Cabeza, Mulie Jarju	
N O V E M B E R	8	Don Quixote, Knight Errant (El caballero Don Quijote)	Director: Manuel Gutiérrez Aragón Cast: Juan Luis Galiardo, Carlos Iglesias, Santiago Ramos, Fernando Guillén Cuervo, Manuel Manquiña, Kiti Manver, Manuel Alexandre, Juan Diego Botto, Emma Suárez	
N O V E M B E R	8	Aro Tolbukhin. En la mente del asesino	Director: Agustín Villaronga, Isaac Pierre Racine, Lydia Zimmermann Cast: Daniel Giménez Cacho, Carmen Beato, Jozan Zoltan	
N O V E M B E R	15	Second Name (El segundo nombre)	Director: Paco Plaza Cast: Erica Prior, Trae Houlihan, Teresa Gimpera, Craig Hill, Denis Rafter, Frank O'Sullivan, Richard Collins-Moore	
N O V E M B E R	22	Salomé	Director: Carlos Saura Cast: Aída Gómez, Pere Arquillué, Paco Mora, Carmen Villena, Javier Toca	
N O V E M B E R	29	Kamchatka	Director: Marcelo Piñeyro Cast: Ricardo Darín, Cecilia Roth	

== Box office ==
The ten highest-grossing Spanish films in 2002, by domestic box office gross revenue, are as follows:

Highest-grossing films of 2002
Rank	Title	Distributor	Admissions	Domestic gross (€)
1	The Other Side of the Bed (El otro lado de la cama)	Disney	2,726,871	12,172,898.07
2	Mondays in the Sun (Los lunes al sol)	Warner Sogefilms	1,602,946	7,577,326.14
3	Son of the Bride (El hijo de la novia)	Alta Classics	1,255,150	5,717,706.54
4	Talk to Her (Hable con ella)	Warner Sogefilms	1,152,329	5,231,334.23
5	Darkness	Sociedad General de Derechos Audiovisuales	885,361	3,987,669.68
6	Box 507 (La caja 507)	Warner Sogefilms	498,113	2,285,911.92
7	My Mother Likes Women (A mi madre le gustan las mujeres)	Lauren Film	429,098	1,927,499.42
8	Kamchatka	Hispano Foxfilm	382,874	1,860,645.23
9	Common Ground (Lugares comunes)	Alta Classics	367,490	1,731,641.98
10	800 Bullets (800 balas)	Warner Sogefilms	388,589	1,726,009.25

== See also ==
- 17th Goya Awards
