= 17th Goya Awards =

- Date: February 1, 2003
- Site: Palacio Municipal de Congresos de Madrid
- Hosted by: Alberto San Juan; Guillermo Toledo

Highlights
- Best Film: Mondays in the Sun
- Best Actor: Javier Bardem; Mondays in the Sun
- Best Actress: Mercedes Sampietro; Common Places
- Most awards: Mondays in the Sun (5)
- Most nominations: Mondays in the Sun (8)

Television coverage
- Network: TVE

The 17th Goya Awards took place at the Palacio Municipal de Congresos in Madrid, Spain on 1 February 2003.

Mondays in the Sun won the award for Best Film.

== Winners and nominees ==
The winners and nominees are listed as follows:

Best Film: Mondays in the Sun; The City of No Limits; The Other Side of the Bed; Talk to Her	Best Director: Fernando León de Aranoa – Mondays in the Sun; Pedro Almodóvar – Talk to Her; Antonio Hernández – The City of No Limits; Emilio Martínez – The Other Side of the Bed
Best Actor: Javier Bardem – Mondays in the Sun; Sancho Gracia – 800 Bullets; Javier Cámara – Talk to Her; Juan Luis Galiardo – Don Quixote, Knight Errant	Best Actress: Mercedes Sampietro – Common Places; Ana Fernández – Story of a Kiss; Adriana Ozores – Nobody's Life; Leonor Watling – My Mother Likes Women
Best Supporting Actor: Luis Tosar – Mondays in the Sun; José Coronado – Box 507; Carlos Hipólito – Story of a Kiss; Alberto San Juan – The Other Side of the Bed	Best Supporting Actress: Geraldine Chaplin – The City of No Limits; María Esteve – The Other Side of the Bed; Mar Regueras – Rancour; Tina Sainz – Story of a Kiss
Best Original Screenplay: Enrique Brasó, Antonio Hernández – The City of No Limits; Fernando León de Aranoa, Ignacio del Moral – Mondays in the Sun; Roger Gual, Julio D. Wallovits – Smoking Room; Pedro Almodóvar – Talk to Her	Best Adapted Screenplay: Adolfo Aristarain, Kathy Saavedra – Common Places; Manuel Gutiérrez Aragón – Don Quixote, Knight Errant; Fernando Trueba – The Shanghai Spell; Antonio Chavarrías – You'll Be Back
Best New Actor: José Ángel Egido – Mondays in the Sun; Roberto Enríquez – The Impatient Alchemist; Carlos Iglesias – Don Quixote, Knight Errant; Guillermo Toledo – The Other Side of the Bed	Best New Actress: Lolita Flores – Rancour; Clara Lago – Carol's Journey; Nieve de Medina – Mondays in the Sun; Marta Etura – Nobody's Life
Best Spanish Language Foreign Film: The Last Train · Uruguay; The Crime of Father Amaro · Mexico; A Lucky Day · Argentina; Nothing More · Cuba	Best European Film: The Pianist · United Kingdom/Poland; Gosford Park · United Kingdom; Italian for Beginners · Denmark; Mostly Martha · Germany
Best New Director: Roger Gual. Julio D. Wallovits – Smoking Room; Eduard Cortés – Nobody's Life; Daniela Fejerman and Inés París – My Mother Likes Women; Ramón Salazar – Stones	Best Animated Film: Dragon Hill, la colina del dragón; Anjé, la leyenda del Pirineo; El rey de la granja; Puerta del tiempo
Best Cinematography: José Luis Alcaine – Don Quixote, Knight Errant; José Luis López-Linares –The Shanghai Spell; Raúl Pérez Cubero – Story of a Kiss; Néstor Calvo – They're Watching Us	Best Editing: Ángel Hernández Zoido – Box 507; Alejandro Lázaro – 800 Bullets; Ernest Blasi – Aro Tolbukhin: In the Mind of a Killer; Nacho Ruiz Capillas – Mondays in the Sun
Best Art Direction: Salvador Parra – The Shanghai Spell; Félix Murcia – Don Quixote, Knight Errant; Rafael Palmero – The Impatient Alchemist; Gil Parrondo – Story of a Kiss	Best Production Supervision: Fernando Victoria de Lecea – Box 507; Andrés Santana – Carol's Journey; Javier Arsuaga – Warriors; Luis Gutiérrez – The Shanghai Spell
Best Sound: Gilles Ortion, Alfonso Pino, Pelayo Gutiérrez, José Vinader – The Other Side of the Bed; Licio Marcos de Oliveira, Luis de Veciana, Alfonso Pino – Box 507; Salva Mayolas, Dani Fontrodona, Marc Orts – Darkness; Miguel Rejas, José Antonio Bermúdez, Manuel Laguna, Rosa Ortiz, Diego Garrido – Talk to Her	Best Special Effects: Juan Ramón Molina, Félix Bergés, Rafael Solórzano – 800 Bullets; Raúl Romanillos, Félix Bergés, Carlos Martínez – The Biggest Robbery Never Told; David Martí, Montse Ribé, Jorge Calvo – Talk to Her; Reyes Abades, Emilio Ruiz, Aurelio Sánchez Herrera – Warriors
Best Costume Design: Lala Huete – The Shanghai Spell; Anna Anni, Alessandro Lai, Alberto Spiazzi – Callas Forever; Lena Mossum – Carol's Journey; Gumersindo Andrés – Story of a Kiss	Best Makeup and Hairstyles: Gregorio Ros, Pepito Juez – The Shanghai Spell; Gemma Planchadell, Mónica Núñez – Lisístrata; Paca Almenara, Alicia López, Antonio Panizza – Story of a Kiss; Susana Sánchez, Manolo Carretero – Thirteen Chimes
Best Original Score: Alberto Iglesias – Talk to Her; Roque Baños –800 Bullets; Víctor Reyes – The City of No Limits; Juan Bardem – My Mother Likes Women	Best Original Song: "Sevillana para Carlos" by Roque Baños – Salomé; "Ojos de gacela" by Eva Gancedo and Rasha – Burn with Me; "Un lugar más allá" by Emilio Alquézar – Dragon Hill, la colina del dragón; "Human Monkeys", Najwa Nimri and Carlos Jean – Warriors
Best Fictional Short Film: Nada que perder; El espantapájaros; Historia de un búho; Hoy por ti y mañana por mí; Uno más, uno menos	Best Animated Short Film: Sr. Trapo; El negre és el color dels déus; TV
Best Documentary: El efecto Iguazú; Balseros; De Salamanca a ninguna parte; Nómadas del viento	Documentary Short Film: Túnel número 20; Howard Hawks. San Sebastián 1972; Marmadrid

== Honorary Goya ==
- Manuel Alexandre
