= Carol's Journey =

2002 film

- Theatrical release poster
- Spanish: El viaje de Carol
- Directed by: Imanol Uribe
- Screenplay by: Ángel García Roldán; Imanol Uribe
- Based on: A boca de noche by Ángel García Roldán
- Produced by: Andrés Santana; Fernando Bovaira
- Starring: Clara Lago; Juan José Ballesta; Álvaro de Luna; María Barranco; Carmelo Gómez; Rosa Mª Sardá
- Cinematography: Gonzalo F. Berridi
- Edited by: Teresa Font
- Music by: Bingen Mendizábal
- Production companies: Sogecine; Aiete; Ariane Films
- Distributed by: Sogepaq
- Release date: 6 September 2002 (Spain)
- Running time: 104 minutes
- Countries: Spain; Portugal
- Language: Spanish

Carol's Journey (Spanish: El viaje de Carol) is a 2002 Spanish-Portuguese drama film directed by Imanol Uribe which stars Clara Lago and Juan José Ballesta alongside Álvaro de Luna, María Barranco, Carmelo Gómez and Rosa María Sardá. The plot concerns a Spanish-American girl's visit to her family's hometown during the Spanish Civil War.

== Plot ==
12 year-old Carol and her mother Aurora visit their family's hometown in Spain, during the Civil War in 1938. It is Carol's first time in the country, as she grew up in New York in the United States. Her American father, Robert, is fighting in the frontlines as a pilot with the International Brigade. Aurora keeps in touch with her husband by writing letters, which are carried to the frontlines by a Portuguese smuggler.

Aurora's family is conservative and middle-class; her and Carol's liberal American manners bring culture shock to the community, especially to the Catholic clergy. In a visit to her former teacher and best friend Maruja, Aurora reveals that she is seriously ill, and that she in fact came home to die.

After her mother dies, Carol asks her grandfather, Don Amalio, to keep it secret from her father so as not to add to his worries. She also convinces Maruja to write letters to Robert in her mother's name. Carol goes to live with her aunt Dolores and cousin Blanca; she befriends three local boys, including Tomiche, with whom she is attracted romantically.

After Madrid falls and the Republican faction is defeated in the war, Don Amalio, who is the only Republican sympathizer in a family supportive of General Franco, is forced to burn his pro-Republican books. Robert sneaks home, and Carol is overjoyed to see her father again. The local authorities immediately search Don Amalio's house for the fugitive. In the pursuit, Tomiche, whom Carol wanted to introduce to her father, is accidentally shot and killed.

In the epilogue, Carol returns to New York to her paternal grandparents' care. Don Amalio expresses hope that Carol's father, who has been taken prisoner, would suffer only a few months in jail at worst, being a citizen of the influential United States. In the car ride on the way to the port, Carol's surviving friends catch up on their bikes to say farewell; she imagines Tomiche with them, saying goodbye as well.

== Cast ==
- Clara Lago as Carol
- Juan José Ballesta as Tomiche
- María Barranco as Aurora
- Ben Temple as Robert
- Rosa María Sardá as Maruja
- Lucina Gil as Dolores
- Luna McGill as Blanca
- Álvaro de Luna as Amalio
- Carmelo Gómez as Adrián
- Daniel Retuerto
- Andrés de la Cruz
- Ana Villa as Chana
- Alberto Jiménez as Alfonsoc

== Production ==
An adaptation of Ángel García Roldán's novel A boca de noche, the screenplay was penned by Ángel García Roldán and Imanol Uribe; other crew responsibilities were entrusted to Gonzalo F. Berridi (cinematography), Teresa Font (film editing) and Bingen Mendizábal (music). Andrés Santana and Fernando Bovaira were credited as producers. A Spanish-Portuguese co-production (90%–10%), the film was produced by Sogecine and Aiete-Ariane Films. It was shot in Cantabria, Galicia and Portugal.

== Release ==
Distributed by Sogepac, the film was theatrically released in Spain on 6 September 2002.

== Accolades ==
Year	Award	Category	Nominee(s)	Result	Ref.
2003	17th Goya Awards	Best New Actress	Clara Lago	Nominated	
2003	17th Goya Awards	Best Production Supervision	Andrés Santana	Nominated	
2003	17th Goya Awards	Best Costume Design	Lena Mossum	Nominated	

== See also ==
- List of Spanish films of 2002
- List of Portuguese films of 2002
