= Guerreros =

- DVD poster
- Directed by: Daniel Calparsoro
- Written by: Juan Cavestany; Daniel Calparsoro
- Produced by: Fernando Bovaira; Enrique López Lavigne
- Starring: Eloy Azorín; Eduardo Noriega; Rubén Ochandiano; Carla Pérez; Jordi Vilches; Roger Casamajor; Iñaki Font; Sandra Wahlbeck; Olivier Sitruk
- Distributed by: TVE; Canal+España (Digital+)
- Release date: 22 March 2002 (Spain)
- Running time: 96 minutes
- Country: Spain
- Languages: Spanish; Albanian; Serbian; English; French
- Box office: €909,145 (Spain)

Guerreros (lit. 'Warriors') is a 2002 Spanish war film directed by Daniel Calparsoro which stars Eloy Azorín and Eduardo Noriega.

== Plot ==
The plot follows a group of Spanish soldiers and their French allies stationed at the border between Kosovo and the rest of Serbia during a KFOR humanitarian deployment. The young and inexperienced soldiers become embroiled in the conflict that surrounds them and struggle to survive.

== Cast ==
- Eloy Azorín
- Eduardo Noriega
- Rubén Ochandiano
- Carla Pérez
- Jordi Vilches
- Roger Casamajor
- Iñaki Font
- Sandra Wahlbeck
- Olivier Sitruk
- Roman Luknár

== Release ==
The film was theatrically released in Spain on 22 March 2002, amid an "aggressive" marketing campaign. However, the film's subpar performance at the box office eventually earned it a reputation as a domestic commercial blunder of the year together with The Shanghai Spell.

== Awards and nominations ==
Year	Award	Category	Nominee(s)	Result	Ref.
2003	17th Goya Awards	Best Production Supervision	Javier Arsuaga	Nominated	
2003	17th Goya Awards	Best Original Song	Carlos Jean, Najwa Nimri	Nominated	
2003	17th Goya Awards	Best Special Effects	Aurelio Sánchez-Herrera, Emilio Ruiz del Río, Reyes Abades	Nominated	

== See also ==
- List of Spanish films of 2002
