= 15th European Film Awards =

2002 film awards ceremony in Italy

- Date: December 7, 2002
- Site: Teatro dell'Opera di Roma, Rome, Italy
- Hosted by: Asia Argento, Mel Smith
- Organized by: European Film Academy

Highlights
- Best Picture: Talk to Her
- Best Direction: Pedro Almodóvar; Talk to Her
- Best Actor: Sergio Castellitto; Mostly Martha and My Mother's Smile
- Best Actress: The ensemble cast: Catherine Deneuve; Isabelle Huppert; Emmanuelle Béart; Fanny Ardant; Virginie Ledoyen; Danielle Darrieux; Ludivine Sagnier Firmine Richard; 8 Women
- Most awards: Talk to Her (5)
- Most nominations: Talk to Her (7)

The 15th European Film Awards were presented on December 7, 2002 in Rome, Italy. The winners were selected by the members of the European Film Academy.

== Awards ==
=== Best Film ===
English title	Original title	Director	Country
Talk to Her	Hable con ella	Pedro Almodóvar	Spain
Bend It Like Beckham		Gurinder Chadha	United Kingdom
Bloody Sunday		Paul Greengrass	United Kingdom
8 Women	8 femmes	François Ozon	France
Lilya 4-ever	Lilja 4-ever	Lukas Moodysson	Sweden
The Man Without a Past	Mies vailla menneisyyttä	Aki Kaurismäki	Finland, Germany, France
The Magdalene Sisters		Peter Mullan	United Kingdom
The Pianist		Roman Polanski	Poland, France, Germany, United Kingdom

=== Best Director ===
Nominee	English title	Original title
Pedro Almodóvar	Talk to Her	Hable con ella
Mike Leigh	All or Nothing	
Andreas Dresen	Grill Point	Halbe treppe
Marco Bellocchio	My Mother's Smile	L'ora di religione
Alexander Sokurov	Russian Ark	Русский ковчег
Ken Loach	Sweet Sixteen	
Aki Kaurismäki	The Man Without a Past	Mies vailla menneisyyttä
Roman Polanski	The Pianist	

=== Best Screenwriter ===
Nominee	English title	Original title
Pedro Almodóvar	Talk to Her	Hable con ella
François Ozon	8 Women	8 femmes
Paul Greengrass	Bloody Sunday	
Krzysztof Kieślowski (posthumously) and Krzysztof Piesiewicz	Heaven	
Tonino Benacquista	Read My Lips	Sur mes lèvres
Paul Laverty	Sweet Sixteen	
Aki Kaurismäki	The Man Without a Past	Mies vailla menneisyyttä

=== Best Actor ===
Nominee	English title	Original title
Sergio Castellitto	Mostly Martha	Bella Martha
Sergio Castellitto	My Mother's Smile	L'ora di religione
Timothy Spall	All or Nothing	
Javier Bardem	Mondays in the Sun	Los lunes al sol
Martin Compston	Sweet Sixteen	
Markku Peltola	The Man Without a Past	Mies vailla menneisyyttä
Olivier Gourmet	The Son	Le fils
Javier Cámara	Talk to Her	Hable con ella

=== Best Actress ===
Nominee(s)	English title	Original title
Fanny Ardant, Emmanuelle Béart, Danielle Darrieux, Catherine Deneuve, Isabelle Huppert, Virginie Ledoyen, Firmine Richard, and Ludivine Sagnier	8 Women	8 femmes
Laura Morante	A Journey Called Love	Un viaggio chiamato amore
Oksana Akinshina	Lilya 4-ever	Lilja 4-ever
Samantha Morton	Morvern Callar	
Martina Gedeck	Mostly Martha	Bella Martha
Emmanuelle Devos	Read My Lips	Sur mes lèvres
Kati Outinen	The Man Without a Past	Mies vailla menneisyyttä

=== Best Documentary ===
English title	Original title	Director(s)	Country
To Be and to Have	Être et avoir	Nicolas Philibert	France
All About My Father	Alt om min far	Even Benestad	Norway, Denmark
Clown in Kabul		Enzo Balestrieri and Stefano Moser	Italy
Fellini: I'm a Born Liar	Federico Fellini – Sono un Gran Bugiardo	Damian Pettigrew	France, Italy, United Kingdom
Lost in La Mancha		Keith Fulton and Louis Pepe	United Kingdom, United States
Missing Allen: The Man Who Became a Camera		Christian Bauer	Germany, United States
The Bricklayer	Muraren	Stefan Jarl	Sweden
Winged Migration	Le peuple migrateur	Jacques Perrin	France, Germany, Switzerland, Spain, Italy

=== European Discovery ===
English title	Original title	Director(s)	Country
Hukkle		György Pálfi	Hungary
Two Friends	Due amici	Spiro Scimone and Francesco Sframeli	Italy
Minor Mishaps	Små ulykker	Annette K. Olesen	Denmark, Sweden
Respiro		Emanuele Crialese	Italy, Germany
No Regrets	Nichts bereuen	Benjamin Quabeck	Germany
Smoking Room		Roger Gual and Julio D. Wallovits	Spain
Pleasant Days	Szép napok	Kornél Mundruczó	Hungary
The Warrior		Asif Kapadia	United Kingdom, Germany, France, India
Guardian of the Frontier	Varuh meje	Maja Weiss	Slovenia, Germany, France
Wesh, Wesh, What's Happening?	Wesh wesh, qu'est-ce qui se passe?	Rabah Ameur-Zaïmeche	France
The Kite	Змей	Aleksei Muradov	Russia

=== Best Non-European Film ===
English title	Original title	Director(s)	Country
Divine Intervention	يد إلهية	Elia Suleiman	Palestine, France, Morocco, Germany
8 Mile		Curtis Hanson	United States
City of God	Cidade de Deus	Fernando Meirelles and Kátia Lund	Brazil, France
My Big Fat Greek Wedding		Joel Zwick	United States
Spider		David Cronenberg	Canada, United Kingdom, France
Spirited Away	千と千尋の神隠し	Hayao Miyazaki	Japan

=== Best Cinematographer ===
Nominee	English title	Original title
Pawel Edelman	The Pianist	
Ivan Strasburg	Bloody Sunday	
Frank Griebe	Heaven	
Alwin Kuchler	Morvern Callar	
Tillman Büttner	Russian Ark	Русский ковчег
Timo Salminen	The Man Without a Past	Mies vailla menneisyyttä
Javier Aguirresarobe	Talk to Her	Hable con ella
