= Dragon Hill, la colina del dragón =

2002 Spanish animated film

- Directed by: Ángel Izquierdo
- Written by: Antonio Zurera Aragón
- Produced by: Antonio Zurera Aragón
- Music by: Emilio Alquézar
- Production company: Milimetros Feature Animation
- Distributed by: Universal Pictures (Spain); All Rights Management (International)
- Release date: 20 December 2002
- Running time: 80 minutes
- Country: Spain
- Language: Spanish
- Box office: $916,335

Dragon Hill, la colina del dragón is a 2002 Spanish animated adventure fantasy film directed by Ángel Izquierdo and written and produced by Antonio Zurera Aragón. It won the Goya Award for Best Animated Film at the 17th Goya Awards.

== Voice cast ==
- Elvira García as Elfy
- Esperanza García as Kevin
- Antonio García Moral as Septimus
- Carmen Capdet as Maud
- Nuria Cepero as Gala
- Vicente Gil as Ken
- Ariana Jimenez as Vivien
- Reinaldo Coello as Ethelbert
- Gloria Gonzalez as Speaker
- Joaquín Gómez as Newton / Cook 1 / Viking
- Francesc Rocamora as Montesquieu
- Ferran Calvo as Cook 2 and Bear
- Juan Miguel Diez as Cook 3 and Captain
- Robert Paterson as Director

== Release ==
The film was released theatrically on 20 December 2002 in Spain. Released in the Netherlands on 9 October 2003, the film grossed $678,228. It was re-released in Poland on 26 January 2007 and grossed $238,107.

=== Accolades ===
At the 17th Goya Awards, Dragon Hill won Best Animated Film and the song "Un Lugar Más Allá" by Emilio Alquézar was nominated for Best Original Song, but lost to "Sevillana Para Carlos" by Roque Baños for Salomé.

== Sequels ==
The film was followed by two sequels, El cubo mágico (The Magic Cube) in 2006 and El corazón del roble (The Heart of the Oak) in 2012.
