= They're Watching Us =

- Theatrical release poster
- Spanish: Nos miran
- Directed by: Norberto López Amado
- Screenplay by: Jorge Guerricaechevarría
- Based on: Los otros by Javier García Sánchez
- Starring: Carmelo Gómez; Icíar Bollaín; Massimo Ghini; Manuel Lozano; Carolina Pettersson; Margarita Lozano; Roberto Álvarez; Francisco Algora; Karra Elejalde
- Cinematography: Néstor Calvo
- Edited by: Mª Elena Sainz de Rozas
- Music by: Bingen Mendizabal; Borja Ramos
- Production companies: BocaBoca Producciones; Hera International Film
- Distributed by: Columbia TriStar Films de España
- Release date: 20 September 2002 (Spain)
- Running time: 102 minutes
- Countries: Spain; Italy
- Language: Spanish

They're Watching Us (Spanish: Nos miran) is a 2002 Spanish-Italian thriller film directed by Norberto López Amado from a screenplay by Jorge Guerricaechevarría based on the novel Los otros by Javier García Sánchez. It stars Carmelo Gómez with Icíar Bollaín, Margarita Lozano and Francisco Algora.

== Plot ==
Detective Juan García takes over the case of a missing businessman, after the previous investigating officer suffers a mental breakdown. As García is drawn further into the case he uncovers a series of disappearances, with apparent links to the supernatural.

== Cast ==
- Carmelo Gómez as Juan
- Icíar Bollaín as Julia
- Manuel Lozano as Álex
- Carolina Petterson as Laura
- Massimo Ghini as José
- Margarita Lozano as Luisa
- Paco Algora as Muñoz
- Karra Elejalde as Medina
- Roberto Álvarez as sacerdote ('priest')

== Production ==
The film is a BocaBoca and Hera International Film Spanish-Italian co-production.

== Release ==
Distributed by Columbia TriStar, the film was released theatrically in Spain on 20 September 2002.

== Critical reaction ==
Jonathan Holland of Variety deemed the film an "impressive psycho-chiller" and "an unexpected, if flawed, pleasure".

== Accolades ==
Year	Award	Category	Nominee(s)	Result	Ref.
2003	17th Goya Awards	Best Cinematography	Néstor Calvo	Nominated	

== See also ==
- List of Spanish films of 2002
