= José Ángel Egido =

Spanish actor (born 1951)

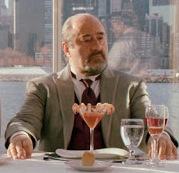
- Born: José Ángel Egido Pérez; 30 November 1951 (age 73); Redondela (Pontevedra), Spain

José Ángel Egido Pérez (born 1951) is a Spanish actor. He won the 2003 Goya Award for Best New Actor for his performance as Lino in Mondays in the Sun.

== Filmography ==
Film
| Year | Title | Role | Notes |
|---|---|---|---|
| 1983 | Occhei, occhei | | |
| 1985 | Juke box | | |
| 1991 | La fuente de la edad | | |
| 1993 | Rosa rosae | Pintor 1º | |
| 1996 | Love Can Seriously Damage Your Health | Mozo | |
| 1997 | Carreteras secundarias | Inspector de Policía | |
| 1997 | Open Your Eyes | Policía | |
| 1999 | By My Side Again | Doctor | |
| 2002 | Mondays in the Sun | Lino | |
| 2003 | Descongélate! | Productor | |
| 2004 | Swindled | Cura | |
| 2004 | Eyes of Crystal | Frese | |
| 2004 | Horas de luz | Chincheta | |
| 2004 | En ninguna parte | José | |
| 2005 | Elsa & Fred | | |
| 2005 | La noche del hermano | Boluda | |
| 2006 | The Silly Age | Don Ramón | |
| 2006 | Napoleon and Me | Marchand | |
| 2006 | GAL | Ministro del Interior | |
| 2007 | Hotel Tívoli | Ernesto | |
| 2008 | Cobardes | Jefe de Joaquín | |
| 2008 | The Blind Sunflowers | Rector | |
| 2010 | For the Good of Others | Vicente | |
| 2010 | Paper Birds | Don Ricardo | |
| 2011 | Águila Roja, la película | Cardenal | |
| 2012 | A puerta fría | Fuentes | |
| 2013 | Dreamland | Juan | |
| 2013 | Gente en sitios | | |
| 2013 | Who Killed Bambi? | Ramón | |
| 2014 | Fort Ross | Padre Antonio | |
| 2014 | El club de los incomprendidos | Director | |
| 2015 | Little Galicia | Alfredo | |
| 2015 | Chiamatemi Francesco | Velez | |
| 2016 | María (and Everybody Else) | Antonio | |
| 2018 | Everybody Knows | Jorge | |
| 2019 | The Silence of the Marsh | Carretero | |

TV
| Year | Title | Role | Notes |
|---|---|---|---|
| 2002–2004 | Un Paso Adelante | Víctor Arenales | 6 episodes |
| 2007–2008 | Cuenta atrás | Molina | |
| 2008 | Guante blanco | César Ferrer | |
| 2010–2016 | Águila Roja | Francisco de Mendoza y Balboa, cardenal Mendoza | 87 episodes |
| 2017 | El ministerio del tiempo | Alfred Hitchcock | 1 episode |
| 2021 | Blowing Kisses | | |
