= Thieves (2007 film) =

- Theatrical release poster
- Spanish: Ladrones
- Directed by: Jaime Marques Olarreaga
- Screenplay by: Jaime Marques Olarreaga; Juan Ibáñez
- Produced by: José Ibáñez; Antonio P. Pérez
- Starring: Juan José Ballesta; María Valverde; Patrick Bauchau; María Ballesteros; Carlos Kaniowsky
- Cinematography: David Azcano
- Edited by: Iván Aledo
- Music by: Federico Jusid
- Production companies: Pentagrama Films; Telecinco Cinema; Maestranza Films
- Distributed by: Warner Bros. Pictures
- Release dates: 15 March 2007 (Málaga); 22 June 2007 (Spain)
- Country: Spain
- Language: Spanish

Thieves (Spanish: Ladrones) is a 2007 Spanish film directed by Jaime Marques Olarreaga starring Juan José Ballesta and María Valverde.

== Plot ==
The plot tracks the love story between two pickpockets teaming up together: Álex (raised after age 7 in a foster home) and Sara (a well-off student).

== Cast ==
- Juan José Ballesta as Álex
- María Valverde as Sara
- Patrick Bauchau as Antique dealer
- María Ballesteros as Álex's mother
- Carlos Kaniowsky as Hairdresser

== Production ==
The screenplay of Thieves (Jaime Marques Olarreaga's directorial feature debut) was penned by Marques Olarreaga alongside Juan Ibáñez, based on an original story by Marques Olarreaga and Enrique López Lavigne. Other crew duties were entrusted to David Azcano (cinematography), Iván Aledo (editing), Federico Jusid (music) and Juan Botella (art direction). The film was a Estudios Picasso, Pentagrama Films and Maestranza Films production. Shooting locations included Madrid and Bilbao.

== Reception ==
Reviewing for The Hollywood Reporter, Ray Bennett considered that the film has the "look and feel of a Hollywood vehicle designed to launch its young leads, and that might work, though the film doesn't".

Jonathan Holland of Variety, considered that "though the contrast between gritty theme and dreamy treatment works fine, pic's good looks are sometimes just self-regarding".

Mirito Torreiro of Fotogramas scored the film with 4 out of 5 stars, highlighting the chemistry between Ballesta and Valverde as the best of the film, while citing "some slightly implausible moments" (such as the interrogation) as a negative point.

== Release ==
The film screened at the Málaga Spanish Film Festival in March 2007 as part of the festival's official selection. Distributed by Warner Bros. Pictures International España, it was released theatrically in Spain on 22 June 2007.

== Accolades ==
Year	Award	Category	Nominee(s)	Result	Ref.
2007	10th Málaga Spanish Film Festival	Silver Biznaga. Jury's Special Award		Won	

== See also ==
- List of Spanish films of 2007
