= Juan José Ballesta =

Spanish actor

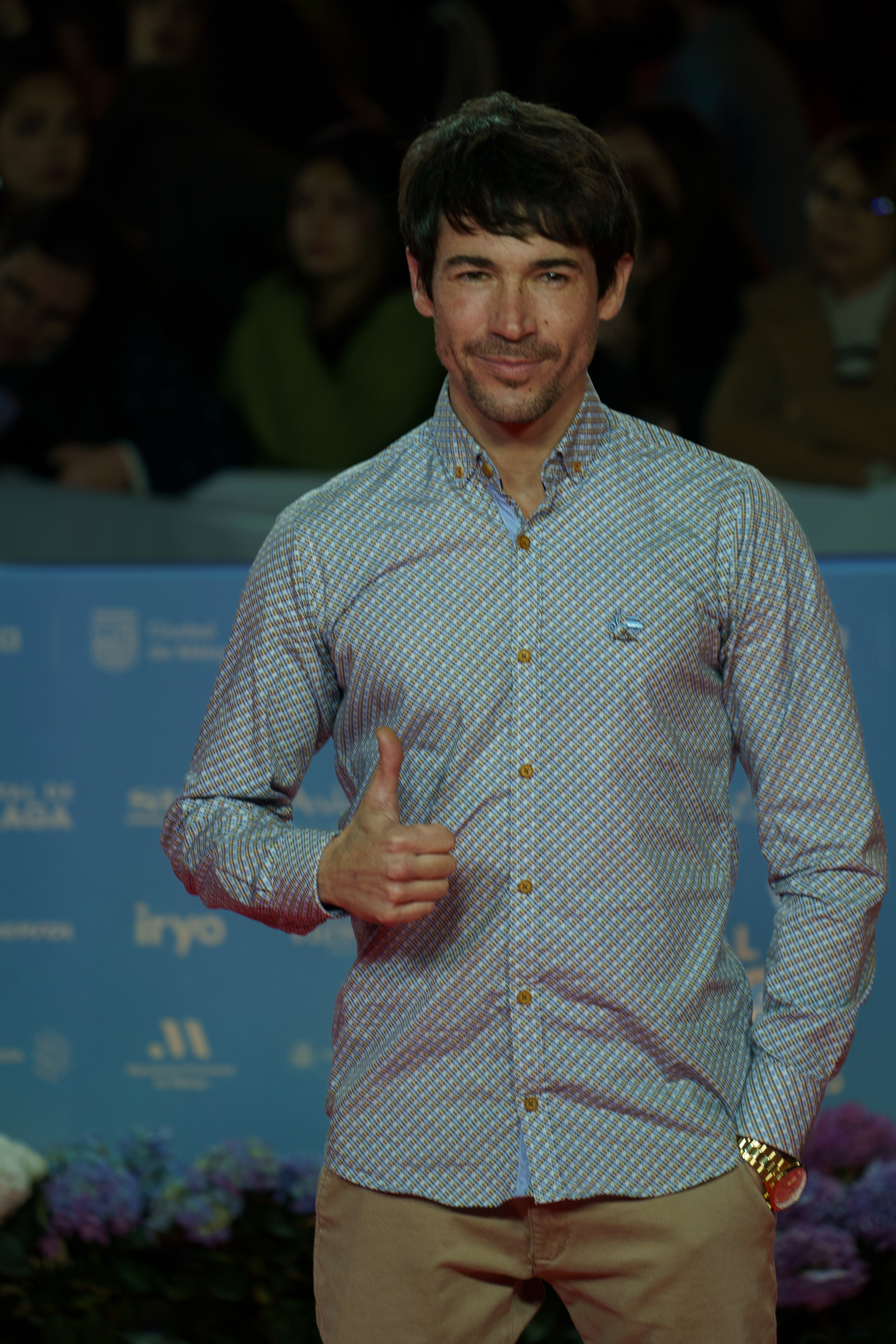
- Ballesta in 2025
- Born: Juan José Ballesta Muñoz; 12 November 1987 (age 38); Parla, Community of Madrid, Spain
- Other name: Juanjo Ballesta
- Years active: 1997–present

Juan José Ballesta Muñoz, also known as Juanjo Ballesta (born 12 November 1987) is a Spanish actor.

== Biography ==
Born on 12 November 1987 in Parla, Ballesta grew up in Toledo. He debuted in a performance in television in 1997, starring in the series Querido maestro. He later joined the cast of the TV series Compañeros, playing the role of Emilio Rubio Viñé for 10 episodes. He rose to fame and won a Goya Award for Best New Actor for El Bola (2000), his debut performance in a feature film.

He has performed in more than sixteen projects, since 1997.

== Selected filmography ==
Film

Year	Title	Role	Notes	Ref.
2000	El Bola	Pablo / Bola	Goya Award for Best New Actor	
2002	El embrujo de Shanghai (The Shangai Spell)	Finito Chacón		
2002	El viaje de Carol (Carol's Journey)	Tomiche		
2003	Planta 4ª (The 4th Floor)	Miguel Ángel		
2005	7 Vírgenes (7 Virgins)	Tano		
2006	Cabeza de perro (Doghead)	Samuel		
2007	Ladrones (Thieves)	Álex		
2009	La casa de mi padre	Gaizka		
2010	Entrelobos	Marcos (adult)	Younger version interpreted by Manuel Camacho	
2010	Bruc. La llegenda	Bruc		
2017	Oro (Gold)	Iturbe		

Television

Year	Title	Role	Notes	Ref.
1997–1998	Querido maestro	Roberto		
2000–2001	Compañeros	Emilio Rubio Viñé	10 episodes. The character was also played by Jorge San José and Daniel Esparza	
2006	Regreso a Moira	Tomás (young)	TV movie part of the Historias para no dormir anthology series. Older version performed by Jordi Dauder	
2010–2012	Hispania, la leyenda	Paulo		
2016	El ministerio del tiempo	Vicente González Toca	2 episodes	
2017–2018	Servir y proteger	Rober Batista		

== Awards ==
- Goya award for Best New Actor (2000)
