= The Suit (2002 film) =

- Theatrical release poster
- Spanish: El traje
- Directed by: Alberto Rodríguez
- Screenplay by: Alberto Rodríguez; Santi Amodeo
- Starring: Manuel Morón; Eugenio José Roca; Vanesa Cabeza; Mulie Jarju
- Cinematography: Álex Catalán
- Edited by: José M. G. Moyano
- Music by: Lavadora
- Distributed by: Alta Films
- Release dates: September 2002 (Zinemaldia); 31 October 2002 (Spain)
- Running time: 105 minutes
- Country: Spain
- Language: Spanish

The Suit (Spanish: El traje) is a 2002 Spanish comedy film directed by Alberto Rodríguez and co-written by Santi Amodeo. It stars Jimmy Roca and Manuel Morón alongside Vanesa Cabeza.

== Plot ==
The plot tracks the plight of Patricio (an illegal immigrant living in Seville with street vendor Roland) who receives a suit improving his self-image in exchange for a car repair. This leads him to cross paths with small-time crook Pan con Queso, who steals from Patricio but ultimately becomes a guide for him, developing a friendship.

== Cast ==
- Eugenio José Roca as Patricio
- Mulie Jarju as Roland
- Manuel Morón as Pan con Queso
- Vanesa Cabeza as María

== Production ==
The film was produced by Tesela PC and it had the association of Canal+ and TVE. It was shot in Seville, Camas, and Mairena del Aljarafe.

== Release ==
The Suit was presented in the 'New Directors' section of the 50th San Sebastián International Film Festival. Distributed by Alta Films. The Suit was released theatrically in Spain on 31 October 2002.

== Reception ==
Jonathan Holland of Variety deemed The Suit to be an " enjoyably inconsequential, loosely structured take on life in Spain's southern underbelly".

== See also ==
- List of Spanish films of 2002
