= Don Quixote, Knight Errant =

- Theatrical release poster
- Spanish: El caballero Don Quijote
- Directed by: Manuel Gutiérrez Aragón
- Screenplay by: Manuel Gutiérrez Aragón
- Based on: Don Quixote (part II) by Miguel de Cervantes
- Starring: Juan Luis Galiardo; Carlos Iglesias; Santiago Ramos; Fernando Guillén Cuervo; Manuel Manquiña; Kiti Manver; Manuel Alexandre; Juan Diego Botto; Emma Suárez
- Cinematography: José Luis Alcaine
- Edited by: José Salcedo
- Music by: José Nieto
- Production company: Gonafilm
- Distributed by: Alta Classics
- Release dates: September 2002 (Venice); 8 November 2002 (Spain)
- Country: Spain
- Language: Spanish
- Budget: 900 million ₧

Don Quixote, Knight Errant (Spanish: El caballero Don Quijote) is a 2002 Spanish adventure film directed and written by Manuel Gutiérrez Aragón, consisting of an adaptation of the second part of Miguel de Cervantes' Don Quixote. It stars Juan Luis Galiardo and Carlos Iglesias respectively as Don Quixote and Sancho Panza, alongside Santiago Ramos, Fernando Guillén Cuervo, Manuel Manquiña, Kiti Manver, Manuel Alexandre, Juan Diego Botto and Emma Suárez.

== Plot ==
The plot, an adaptation of Don Quixote's part II, selects specific chapters of the novel, primarily underpinning as main narrative lines both the Don Quixote's adventures seeking to disenchant the spell put on Dulcinea and his family's attempts to return him home, with the backdrop of the threat posed by the Turk's fleet.

== Cast ==
- Juan Luis Galiardo as Don Quijote
- Carlos Iglesias as Sancho Panza
- Santiago Ramos as Sansón Carrasco
- Fernando Guillén Cuervo as Secretario
- Manuel Manquiña as Merlín
- Kiti Manver as Ama
- Manuel Alexandre as Montesinos
- Juan Diego Botto as Tosilos
- Emma Suárez as Duquesa
- Marta Etura as Dulcinea/Labradora
- Paco Merino as Pedro Recio
- Víctor Clavijo as Barbero
- José Luis Alcobendas as Moro Diablo
- María Isasi as Sobrina
- José Luis Torrijo as Cura
- Joaquín Hinojosa as Duque
- Carmen Machi as Teresa
- Jaime Chavarri as Loquero

== Production ==
An adaptation of the part II of Don Quixote, the screenplay was penned by the director Manuel Gutiérrez Aragón. Gutiérrez Aragón had already directed, and co-wrote alongside Camilo José Cela, El Quijote de Miguel de Cervantes, a television series adapting Don Quixote's part I in 1991, starring Fernando Rey. The reported budget upon the beginning of filming was 900 million ₧. A Gonafilm production, it also had the participation of Telemadrid, Televisió Valenciana and Castilla-La Mancha Televisión. It was shot in locations of Castilla–La Mancha, Andalusia and the Madrid region, primarily in the Valle de Alcudia, province of Ciudad Real.

== Release ==
The film screened out of competition at the 59th Venice International Film Festival in September 2002. Distributed by Alta Classics, it was theatrically released in Spain on 8 November 2002.

== Accolades ==
| Year | Award | Category | Nominee(s) | Result | Ref. |
|---|---|---|---|---|---|
| 2003 | 17th Goya Awards | Goya Award for Best Adapted Screenplay | Manuel Gutiérrez Aragón | Nominated | |
| 2003 | 17th Goya Awards | Best Actor | Juan Luis Galiardo | Nominated | |
| 2003 | 17th Goya Awards | Best New Actor | Carlos Iglesias | Nominated | |
| 2003 | 17th Goya Awards | Best Cinematography | José Luis Alcaine | Won | |
| 2003 | 17th Goya Awards | Best Art Direction | Félix Murcia | Nominated | |

== See also ==
- List of Spanish films of 2002
