= 800 Bullets =

- Theatrical release poster by Oscar Mariné
- Spanish: 800 balas
- Directed by: Álex de la Iglesia
- Written by: Jorge Guerricaechevarría; Álex de la Iglesia
- Produced by: Álex de la Iglesia
- Starring: Sancho Gracia; Ángel de Andrés López; Carmen Maura; Eusebio Poncela; Luis Castro; Manuel Tafallé; Enrique Martínez; Eduardo Gómez; Luciano Federico; Terele Pávez; Ramón Barea; Cesáreo Estévanez; Eduardo Antuña; Gracia Olayo; Yoima Valdés; Berta Ojea; Ane Gabarain
- Cinematography: Flavio Martínez Labiano
- Edited by: Alejandro Lázaro
- Music by: Roque Baños
- Production company: Pánico Films
- Distributed by: Warner Sogefilms
- Release dates: 11 October 2002 (Sitges); 18 October 2002 (Spain)
- Running time: 124 minutes
- Country: Spain
- Languages: Spanish; English; Italian
- Budget: c. €5 million

800 Bullets (Spanish: 800 balas) is a 2002 Spanish film directed and produced by Álex de la Iglesia, who jointly penned it alongside Jorge Guerricaechevarría. The cast features Sancho Gracia, Ángel de Andrés, Carmen Maura, Eusebio Poncela, Terele Pávez and Luis Castro, among others. The film, a tribute to Spanish stuntmen who worked in Spaghetti Westerns, features similarities to Spielbergian Oedipal melodramas.

== Plot ==
Julián Torralba is a former film stuntman in Almeria, Spain. He and several of his colleagues, who once made a living in American Westerns shot in Spain, now are reduced to doing stunt shows for minuscule audiences on the decaying set built for those old Westerns. Julián wrestles with dark memories of the death of his son, also a stuntman, and with estrangement from his daughter-in-law Laura and her son Carlos.

Carlos, a young boy, becomes intrigued with his late father's life and runs away to join Julián and his band of has-beens. There Carlos is initiated into the rambunctious life of these hard-drinking faux cowboys. But when Laura, a powerful executive looking for a new site for a tourist resort, learns that Carlos has joined the hated Julián, she moves to destroy even this remnant of Julián's once-proud career. Julián and the cowboys decide to fight back the only way they know how.

== Cast ==
- Sancho Gracia as Julián.
- Ángel de Andrés López as Cheyenne.
- Carmen Maura as Laura.
- Eusebio Poncela as Scott.
- Luis Castro as Carlos.
- Terele Pávez as Rocío.
- Enrique Martínez as Arrastrado.
- Luciano Federico as Enterrador.
- Ramón Barea as Don Mariano.
- Manuel Tallafé as Manuel.
- Gracia Olayo as Juli.
- Cesáreo Estébanez as Andrés.
- Eduardo Gómez as Ahorcado.
- Eduardo Antuña as Taxista.
- Berta Ojea as Ángeles.
- Ane Gabarain as Jacinta.
- Yoima Valdés as Sonia.
- Alfonso Torregrosa as Jefe Policía.
- Juan Viadas as Monitor.
- Juanjo Legamiz as Camarero.

== Production ==
Produced by Pánico Films, 800 Bullets was shot in the province of Almería. Shooting locations included the Paseo de Almería, the Calle Reina Regente (both in the provincial capital, Almería), Santa María del Águila (El Ejido), Las Salinillas (Gádor-Gérgal-Rioja- Tabernas), Garganta de Alfaro (Rioja) and the Poblado estudio Fort Bravo-Texas Hollywood (Tabernas). The film had a budget of around €5 million.

== Release ==
The film had its world premiere on 11 October 2002 at the Sitges Film Festival (FICC), making its domestic theatrical release a week later, on 18 October. The film performed bad at the box office, becoming one of the economic blunders in 2002 Spanish cinema, grossing less than €2 million.

== Awards and nominations ==
Year	Award	Category	Nominee(s)	Result	Ref.
2003	17th Goya Awards	Best Actor	Sancho Gracia	Nominated	
2003	17th Goya Awards	Best Original Score	Roque Baños	Nominated	
2003	17th Goya Awards	Best Editing	Alejandro Lázaro	Nominated	
2003	17th Goya Awards	Best Special Effects	Juan Ramón Molina, Félix Bergés, Rafael Solórzano	Won	

== See also ==
- List of Spanish films of 2002

== Bibliography ==
- Alonso García, Luis (2003). "Los tropecientos agujeros del poncho" (PDF). Ikusgaiak. 6. San Sebastián: 177–236. ISSN 1137-4438.
- Peña Sevilla, Jesús de la (2009). "Klaatu, Barada, Nikto: Ha llegado Álex de la Iglesia" (PDF). Academia. Revista del Cine Español (158). Madrid: Academia de las Artes y las Ciencias Cinematográficas de España: 17–19. ISSN 1136-8144.
- Buse, Peter; Triana Toribio, Núria; Willis, Andy (2007). The cinema of Álex de la Iglesia. Manchester and New York: Manchester University Press. ISBN 9780719071362.
