= Story of a Kiss =

- Theatrical release poster
- Spanish: Historia de un beso
- Directed by: José Luis Garci
- Written by: José Luis Garci; Horacio Valcárcel
- Starring: Alfredo Landa; Ana Fernández Carlos Hipólito; Agustín González
- Cinematography: Raúl Pérez Cubero
- Edited by: José Luis Garci; Miguel González Sinde
- Music by: Pablo Cervantes
- Production companies: Nickel Odeon Dos; Enrique Cerezo PC; PC 29
- Distributed by: Columbia TriStar Films de España
- Release date: 25 October 2002
- Running time: 105 minutes
- Country: Spain
- Language: Spanish

Story of a Kiss (Spanish: Historia de un beso) is a 2002 Spanish drama film directed by José Luis Garci from a screenplay by Garci and Horacio Valcárcel. The film received seven Goya Award nominations, but did not win a single one.

== Plot ==
The plot follows two different stories that take place decades apart from each other. Julio (Carlos Hipolito) attends the funeral of the uncle who raised him. After reminiscing with his uncle's friends, Julio remembers his childhood. At that time, his Uncle Blas (Alfredo Landa) fell in love with a much younger women who made him realize how dispassionate his life had become. The adult Julio also attempts to romance a fellow teacher.

== Cast ==
- Alfredo Landa as Blas Otamendi
- Ana Fernández as Andrea
- Agustín González as Don Telmo
- Carlos Hipólito as Julio
- Beatriz Rico as Marisa
- Manuel Lozano as Julipín
- Tina Sainz as Melchora
- Francisco Algora as Don Lino

== Production ==
The film is a Nickel Odeon Dos, Enrique Cerezo PC and PC 29 production. It had a reported budget of 500 million ₧.

== Accolades ==
Year	Award	Category	Nominee(s)	Result	Ref.
2003	17th Goya Awards	Best Actress	Ana Fernández	Nominated	
2003	17th Goya Awards	Best Supporting Actor	Carlos Hipólito	Nominated	
2003	17th Goya Awards	Best Supporting Actress	Tina Sáinz	Nominated	
2003	17th Goya Awards	Best Cinematography	Raúl Pérez Cubero	Nominated	
2003	17th Goya Awards	Best Costume Design	Gumersindo Andrés	Nominated	
2003	17th Goya Awards	Best Production Supervision	Gil Parrondo	Nominated	
2003	17th Goya Awards	Best Makeup and Hairstyles	Paca Almenara, Alicia López, Antonio Panizza	Nominated	

== See also ==
- List of Spanish films of 2002
