= Antonio Dechent =

Spanish actor

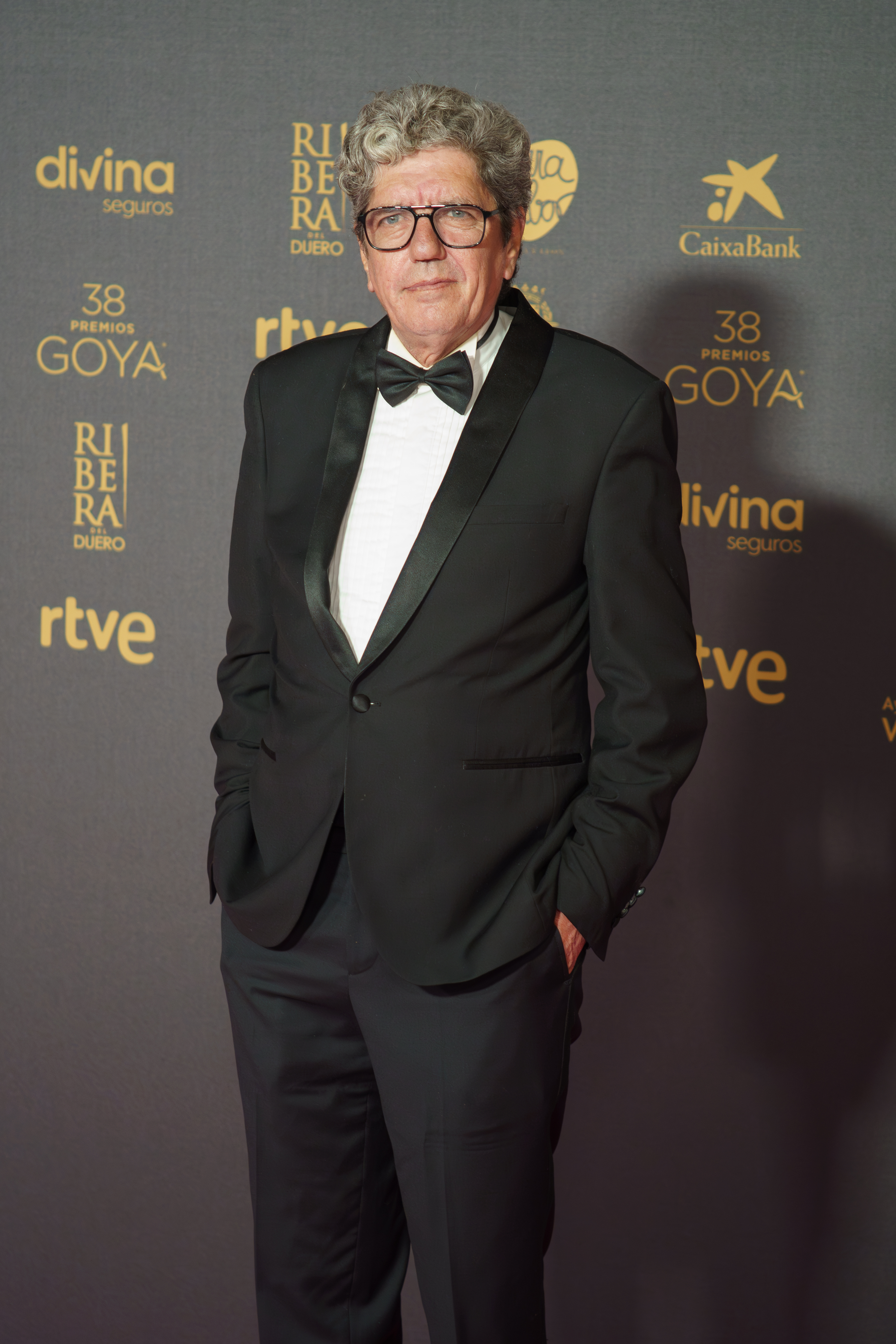
- Dechent in 2024
- Born: 1960 (age 65–66); Seville, Spain
- Occupation: Actor

Antonio Dechent (born 1960) is a Spanish actor. Born in Seville, he is specialised in supporting roles.

== Selected filmography ==
=== Film ===
Film
Year	Title	Role	Notes	Ref.
1988	Matar al Nani	Compañero de Gálvez		
1995	The Day of the Beast	Toyota 3		
1996	Libertarias	Faneca		
1999	Solas (Alone)	Doctor		
2000	Cascabel	Tadeo		
2000	Vengo	Primo Alejandro	(billed as Antonio Pérez Dechent)	
2000	Báilame el agua (Fill Me with Life)	Facundo		
2001	Juego de Luna (Luna's Game)	César		
2001	Intacto (Intact)	Alejandro		
2002	Poniente (Setting)	Miguel		
2002	The Shanghai Spell	Capataz		
2002	Smoking Room	Enrique		
2003	Carmen	El Tuerto		
2004	Tiovivo c. 1950	José Pedro Cervantes		
2004	Atún y chocolate (Tuna and Chocolate)	El Cherif		
2005	Un rey en la Habana (A King in Havana)	Chano		
2006	Alatriste	Curro Garrote		
2006	Los aires difíciles (Rough Winds)	Panrico		
2006	Los Borgia (The Borgia)	Michele Corella		
2006	Salvador (Puig Antich)	Policia BPS (2)		
2006	Remake	Taxista		
2007	Clandestinos	Fermín		
2008	Retorno a Hansala (Return to Hansala)	Manolo		
2008	3 días (Before the Fall)	Urbano		
2010	Entrelobos	sergeant		
2010	Lope (Lope. The Outlaw)	Salcedo		
2011	Juan de los muertos (Juan of the Dead)	Padre Jones		
2012	A puerta fría (Cold Call)	Salva		
2012	La última isla (The Last Island)	Alpidio		
2013	Work 67 (Obra 67)	Juan el Candela		
2016	Secuestro (Boy Missing)	Ernesto Requena		
2017	Lord, Give Me Patience	Guardia Civil		
2018	El aviso (The Warning)	Héctor		
2020	Hasta que la boda nos separe (The Wedding Unplanner)	Arturo		
2021	Hombre muerto no sabe vivir (A Dead Man Cannot Live)	Tano		
2025	Papeles (Papers)	Jordi Shubbert		
2025	Parenostre (Our Father, Our President)	José Manuel Villarejo		
2026	Fiesta Pagäna (A Pagan Party)	Gregorio Ramos "Goyo"		

=== Television ===
TV
Year	Title	Role	Notes
2012	Gernika bajo las bombas	Mola	TV mini-series, 2 episodes
2010	La Mari 2	Julio	TV series, 2 episodes
2006	Films to Keep You Awake: The Baby's Room	Fernández	(TV movie)
2005	Abuela de verano	Amador	TV series, 1 episode
2005	Aída	Juanjo	TV series, 1 episode
2002	La Mari	Julio	TV mini-series, 2 episodes
1997	Blasco Ibañez	Azzati	TV mini-series, 2 episodes

== Theatre ==
- Queipo, el sueño de un general (2010-2011)
- Estado de sitio (obra de teatro)|Estado de sitio (2012)
- Tomar partido (2012)
- La voz Humana (2013)
- La extraña pareja (16 September 2014)

== Accolades ==
Year	Award	Category	Work	Result	Ref.
2002	16th Goya Awards	Best Supporting Actor	Intact	Nominated	
2022	1st Carmen Awards	Best Actor	A Dead Man Cannot Live	Won	
