= Box 507 =

- Theatrical release poster
- Spanish: La caja 507
- Directed by: Enrique Urbizu
- Written by: Enrique Urbizu; Michel Gaztambide
- Starring: Antonio Resines; José Coronado; Goya Toledo; Dafne Fernández; Juan Fernández; Luciano Federico; Miriam Montilla; Sancho Gracia
- Cinematography: Carles Gusi
- Edited by: Ángel Hernández
- Music by: Mario de Benito
- Production company: Sogecine
- Distributed by: Warner Sogefilms
- Release date: 23 August 2002
- Running time: 104 min
- Country: Spain
- Language: Spanish

Box 507 (Spanish: La caja 507) is a 2002 Spanish action thriller film directed and co-written by Enrique Urbizu which stars Antonio Resines and José Coronado. It is set in the Costa del Sol.

== Plot ==
In a quaint town along Spain's wealthy Costa del Sol, a band of professionals plan the robbery of a small bank managed by the respectable middle-aged Modesto Pardo (Antonio Resines). Using his wife as a hostage, the thieves force him inside the bank vault while they make off with the valuables. Battered and dazed and waiting for rescue, Modesto stumbles on a safety deposit box that could hold the answers to the mysterious death of his daughter seven years earlier. His investigation leads him into an intricate web of corruption and foul play while his desire for vengeance provokes violent responses from the police and government officials determined to keep secrets buried.

== Cast ==
- Antonio Resines as Modesto Pardo
- José Coronado as Rafael Mazas
- Goya Toledo as Mónica Vega
- Dafne Fernández as María Pardo Muñoz
- Juan Fernández as Regueira
- Luciano Federico as Marcelo Crecci
- Miriam Montilla as Ángela
- Sancho Gracia as Guijuelo
- Javier Coromina as Toni Lomas
- Gerald Elflein as Camarero Alemán
- Jorge Calvo as Aguiló
- Michele Nicholson as Mujer Francesa
- Sarina Röhr as Mujer Rubia
- Eva Gutiérrez as Empleada Bancosol
- Younes Bachir as Khaled
- Jordi Amat as Guardia Seguridad de Bancosol
- Antonio Mora as Juan
- Félix Álvarez as Ramón
- Miquel Gelabert as Police Inspector 1
- Domi Del Postigo as Police Inspector 2

== Release ==
The film was theatrically released on 23 August 2002.

== Awards and nominations ==
Year	Award	Category	Nominee(s)	Result	Ref.
2002	17th Goya Awards	Best Supporting Actor	José Coronado	Nominated	
2002	17th Goya Awards	Best Production Supervision	Fernando Victoria de Lecea	Won	
2002	17th Goya Awards	Best Editing	Ángel Hernández Zoido	Won	
2002	17th Goya Awards	Best Sound	Licio Marcos de Oliveira, Luis de Veciana, Alfonso Pino	Nominated	

== See also ==
- List of Spanish films of 2002
