= Cascabel (film) =

- Film poster
- Directed by: Daniel Cebrián
- Screenplay by: Daniel Cebrián; Manuel Matjí
- Story by: Ricardo Franco; Augusto Martínez Torres
- Starring: Irene Visedo; Pilar Punzano; Antonio Dechent; Chete Lera; Javier Albalá; Aitor Merino; José Coronado
- Cinematography: Pedro del Rey
- Edited by: Guillermo Represa
- Music by: Eva Gancedo; Pedro Guerra
- Production companies: Alma Ata International Pictures; Galiardo Producciones; Xaloc Producciones
- Distributed by: Warner Sogefilms
- Release date: 11 February 2000
- Country: Spain
- Language: Spanish

Cascabel is a 2000 Spanish coming-of-age drama film directed by Daniel Cebrián from a screenplay by Cebrián and Manuel Matjí based on an original story by Ricardo Franco and Augusto Martínez Torres. It stars Irene Visedo, Pilar Punzano, Antonio Dechent, Chete Lera, Javier Albalá, and Aitor Merino.

== Plot ==
The plot follows Luz and Cascabel, two childhood friends from La Alcarria and wannabe musicians who meet up again upon Luz's return to her hometown after being sexually abused by record label executive Fredy Barleta.

== Cast ==
- Irene Visedo as Cascabel
- Pilar Punzano as Luz
- Antonio Dechent as Tadeo
- Chete Lera as Brigada
- Javier Albalá as Ramón
- Aitor Merino as Tomás
- José Coronado as Fredy Barleta

== Production ==
Penned by Daniel Cebrián and Manuel Matji, the screenplay is based on an original story by Ricardo Franco and Augusto Martínez Torres. The film was produced by Alma Ata alongside Galiardo Producciones and Xaloc Producciones, with the participation of Canal+. Shooting locations included Sacedón.

== Release ==
Distributed by Warner Sogefilms, the film was released theatrically in Spain on 11 February 2000.

== Reception ==
Jonathan Holland of Variety deemed the film to be "a bittersweet rural drama" exploring "the same dark psychological terrain" of Ricardo Franco's works, "though sans [the latter's] intensity".

== Accolades ==
Year	Award	Category	Nominee(s)	Result	Ref.
2000	Toulouse Spanish Film Festival	Golden Violet		Won	

== See also ==
- List of Spanish films of 2000
