= José Coronado =

Spanish actor (born 1957)

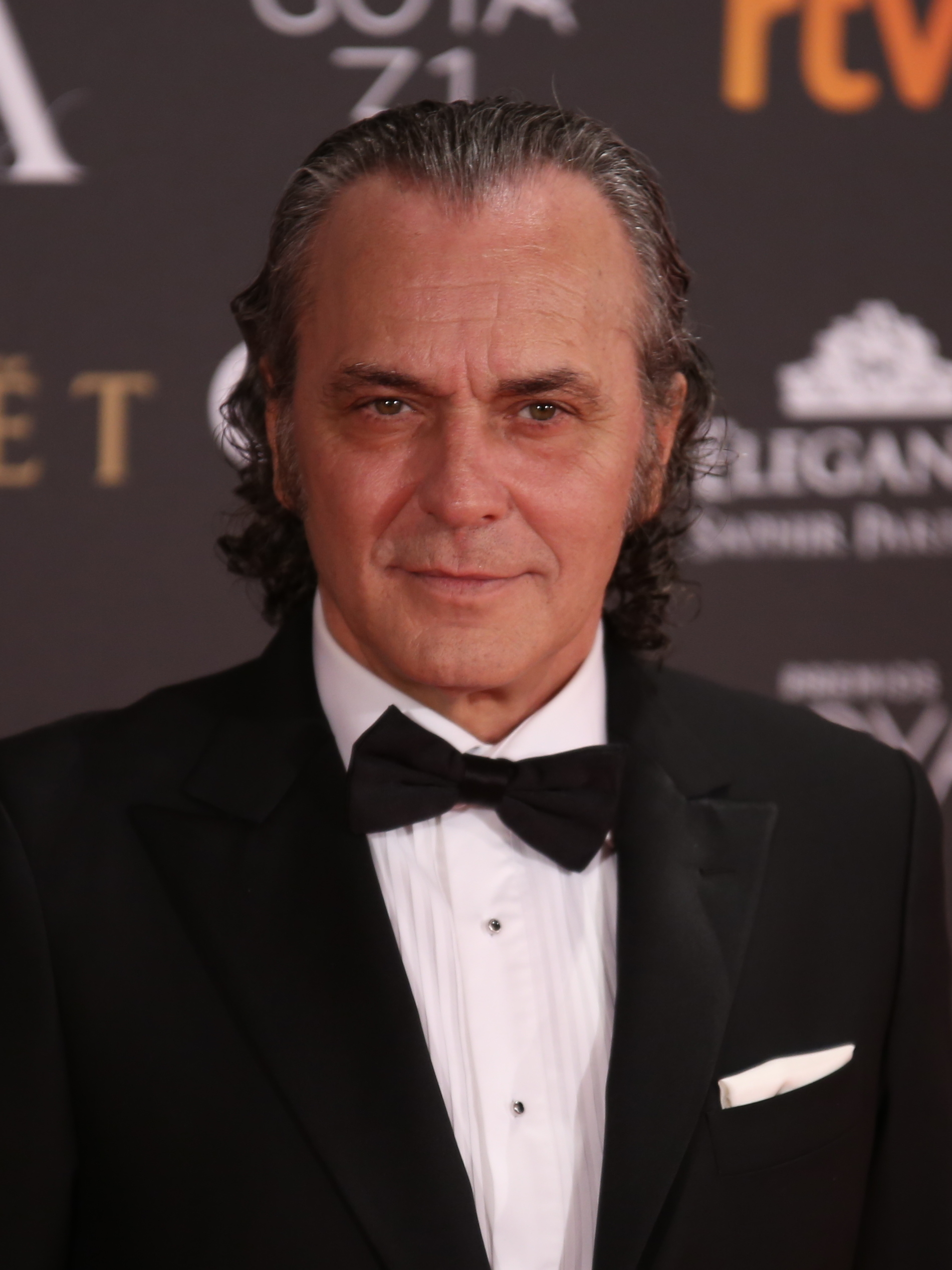
- Coronado in 2017
- Born: José María Coronado García; 14 August 1957 (age 69); Madrid, Spain
- Other name: Jose Coronado
- Occupations: Actor, model
- Years active: 1987–present
- Children: 2

José María Coronado García (born 14 August 1957) is a Spanish film and television actor and former model. His performances playing (often corrupt and/or morally dubious) law enforcement officer roles have brought him some of the greatest successes of his career.

He has received numerous accolades, including two Goya Awards, an Actors and Actresses Union Award, and a Platino Award.

== Early life and education ==
José María Coronado García was born in Madrid on 14 August 1957, to a well-off family from Chamberí.

He started studies in medicine and law, but later dropped out, accepting an offer to participate in a commercial shot in Menorca. Coronado worked as a model, choreographer, and restaurateur, before joining the acting school of Cristina Rota, where he studied acting.

== Acting career ==
Coronado landed a small role in the stage play El público, performed in 1987 in Madrid. His debut in a feature film came with a performance in Waka Waka.

His acting roles have included several corrupt and/or morally dubious law enforcement officer roles, which have brought him some of the greatest successes of his career. He won several awards for his performance as the lead actor in the 2011 film No Rest for the Wicked, including a Goya, a Sant Jordi Award, and a Fotogramas de Plata award.

== Filmography ==
=== Film ===
| Year | Title | Role | Notes | Ref. |
|---|---|---|---|---|
| 1987 | Waka Waka | | Feature film debut | |
| 1988 | Brumal | | | |
| 1988 | Jarrapellejos | | | |
| 1988 | Berlín Blues | David Zimmerman | | |
| 1988 | El tesoro | Jero | | |
| 1990 | La luna negra | Adrián | | |
| 1990 | Yo soy ésa | Jorge Olmedo / Ramón | | |
| 1992 | Salsa rosa (Pink Sauce) | Rosario | | |
| 1992 | Aquí, el que no corre... vuela | Juan | | |
| 1993 | ¡Cucarachas! | Gregorio | | |
| 1993 | El cianuro... ¿solo o con leche? | Enrique | | |
| 1994 | Una chica entre un millón | Teo | | |
| 1996 | Muerte en Granada (The Disappearance of Garcia Lorca) | Néstor González | Néstor Gónzalez is a stand-in for Luis Rosales | |
| 1998 | La mirada del otro (The Naked Eye) | Elio | | |
| 1998 | La vuelta de El Coyote (The Return of the Coyote) | César de Echagüe / El Coyote | | |
| 1998 | Frontera Sur | Roque Díaz Ouro | | |
| 1999 | Goya en Burdeos (Goya in Bordeaux) | Goya joven (young Goya) | The elder version of the character is played by Francisco Rabal | |
| 2000 | Cascabel | Fredy Barleta | | |
| 2001 | Anita no perd el tren (Anita Takes a Chance) | Antonio | | |
| 2002 | La caja 507 (Box 507) | Rafael Mazas | | |
| 2002 | Poniente (Setting) | Curro | | |
| 2002 | La vida de nadie (Nobody's Life) | Emilio Barrero | | |
| 2003 | La vida mancha (Life Marks) | Pedro | | |
| 2003 | Lo mejor que le puede pasar a un cruasán (The Best Thing That Can Happen to a Croissant) | Sebastián | | |
| 2003 | Los reyes magos (The 3 Wise Men) | Gaspar | Voice | |
| 2004 | A+ (Amas) (A+) | Leo | | |
| 2004 | Fuera del cuerpo (Body Confusion) | Marcos / Adolfo | | |
| 2004 | El lobo (The Wolf) | Ricardo | | |
| 2006 | Animales heridos | Silvio Lisboa | | |
| 2006 | La dama boba (Lady Nitwit) | Laurencio | | |
| 2006 | GAL | | | |
| 2006 | La distancia (The Distance) | Guillermo | | |
| 2007 | Tuya siempre (Always Yours) | Manuel Gay | | |
| 2008 | Todos estamos invitados | Xabier Legazpi | | |
| 2008 | La crisis carnívora | Altaicus | Voice | |
| 2011 | No habrá paz para los malvados (No Rest for the Wicked) | Santos Trinidad | | |
| 2012 | El cuerpo (The Body) | Jaime Peña | | |
| 2013 | Fill de Caín (Son of Cain) | Carlos Albert | | |
| 2013 | Los últimos días | Enrique | | |
| 2013 | En solitaire (Turning Tide) | José Monzón | | |
| 2014 | Betibú | Lorenzo Rinaldi | | |
| 2014 | Murieron por encima de sus posibilidades (Dying Beyond Their Means) | José Javier | | |
| 2014 | Fuego | Carlos | | |
| 2015 | Solo química (Just a Little Chemistry) | Julián | | |
| 2016 | La corona partida (The Broken Crown) | Maximiliano I de Habsburgo | | |
| 2016 | Secuestro (Boy Missing) | Raúl | | |
| 2016 | El hombre de las mil caras (Smoke & Mirrors) | Jesús Camoes | | |
| 2016 | Contratiempo (The Invisible Guest) | Tomás Garrido | | |
| 2017 | Es por tu bien (It's for Your Own Good) | Arturo | | |
| 2017 | Oro (Gold) | Sargento Bastaurrés | | |
| 2018 | Tu hijo (Your Son) | Jaime Jiménez | | |
| 2021 | Way Down (The Vault) | Gustavo Medina | | |
| 2021 | La familia perfecta (The Perfect Family) | Miguel | | |
| 2022 | Historias para no contar (Stories Not to Be Told) | Andrés | | |
| 2023 | Cerrar los ojos (Close Your Eyes) | Julio Arenas / Gardel | | |
| 2023 | Verano en rojo (Summer in Red) | Luna | | |
| 2024 | Puntos suspensivos (Ellipsis) | Jota | | |
| 2024 | What About Love | Rafael Santiago | | |
| 2026 | Los creyentes (The Truthers) | Martín | | |
| 2026 | Lucidez † (Watch Your Dreams) | | | |

- Pantalones (2000), by Ana Martínez (short film)
- Perros bajo la lluvia (2001), by Rubén Alonso (short film)
- El intruso (2005), by David Cánovas (short film)
- Huele bien (2000), by Rosa Peña Herranz (short film)
- La malquerida (2006), by Belén Molinero (TV episode)
- El teniente Lorrena (1992), by António-Pedro Vasconcelos (TV movie)

=== Television ===
| Year | Title | Role | Notes | Ref |
|---|---|---|---|---|
| 1989–1990 | Brigada Central | Agente Lucas | | |
| 1994 | Compuesta y sin novio | Avelino | | |
| 1994–1996 | Hermanos de leche | Chus | | |
| 1996 | Oh Espanya! | | | |
| 1997 | Don Juan | | | |
| 1998–2002 | Periodistas | Luis Sanz | | |
| 2003 | Código fuego | Alberto Quintana | | |
| 2004 | Attenti a quei tre | | TV miniseries | |
| 2004 | Los 80 | Martín | | |
| 2005 | Abuela de verano | | | |
| 2007 | RIS Científica | Ricardo Ventura | | |
| 2009–2010 | Acusados | Joaquín de la Torre | | |
| 2011 | Cheers | | | |
| 2013 | Aída | | | |
| 2014–2016 | El Príncipe | Fran Peyón | | |
| 2018 | Gigantes | Abraham Guerrero | | |
| 2018–2020 | Vivir sin permiso (Unauthorized Living) | Nemo Bandeira | | |
| 2021 | El inocente (The Innocent) | Teo Aguilar | | |
| 2022–2024 | Entrevías (Wrong Side of the Tracks) | Tirso Abantos | Main | |
| 2023 | La chica de nieve (The Snow Girl) | Eduardo | | |
| 2025 | Rotten Legacy | Federico Seligman | | |
| 2026 | The Final Problem † | Basil | Lead role | |

== Accolades ==
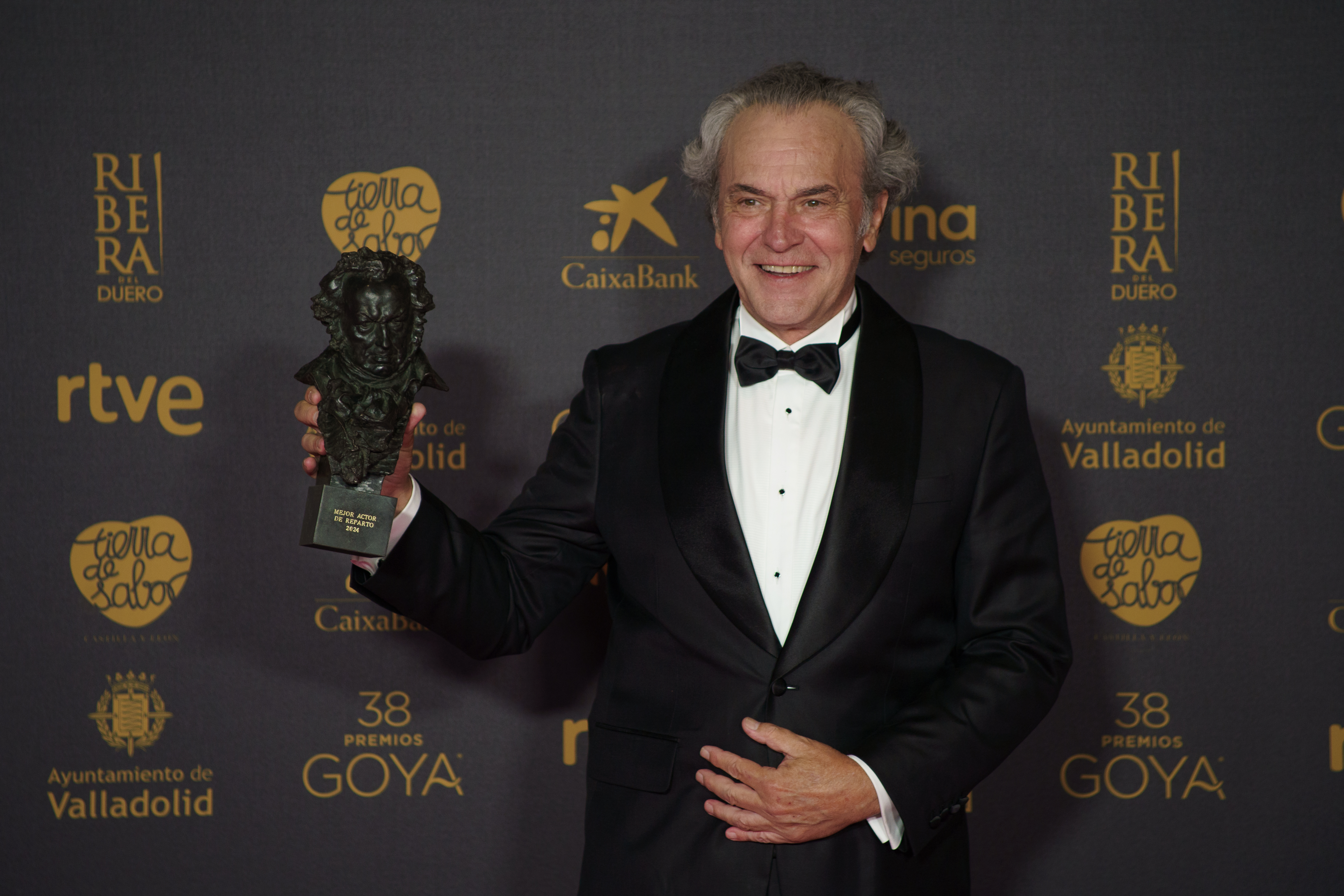
Coronado showing his Goya Award for Best Supporting Actor for Close Your Eyes after the February 2024 gala in Valladolid.

| Year | Award | Category | Work | Result | Ref. |
|---|---|---|---|---|---|
| 2000 | 14th Goya Awards | Best Supporting Actor | Goya in Bordeaux | Nominated | |
| 2003 | 17th Goya Awards | Best Supporting Actor | Box 507 | Nominated | |
| 2012 | 26th Goya Awards | Best Actor | No Rest for the Wicked | Won | |
| 2012 | 21st Actors and Actresses Union Awards | Best Film Actor in a Leading Role | No Rest for the Wicked | Won | |
| 2014 | 6th Gaudí Awards | Best Supporting Actor | Son of Cain | Nominated | |
| 2017 | 72nd CEC Medals | Best Supporting Actor | Smoke & Mirrors | Nominated | |
| 2019 | 6th Feroz Awards | Best Main Actor in a Film | Your Son | Nominated | |
| 2019 | 74th CEC Awards | Best Actor | Your Son | Nominated | |
| 2019 | 33rd Goya Awards | Best Actor | Your Son | Nominated | |
| 2019 | 28th Actors and Actresses Union Awards | Best Film Actor in a Leading Role | Your Son | Nominated | |
| 2024 | 11th Feroz Awards | Best Supporting Actor in a Film | Close Your Eyes | Nominated | |
| 2024 | 38th Goya Awards | Best Supporting Actor | Close Your Eyes | Won | |
| 2024 | 32nd Actors and Actresses Union Awards | Best Film Actor in a Secondary Role | Close Your Eyes | Nominated | |
| 2024 | 11th Platino Awards | Best Supporting Actor | Close Your Eyes | Won | |
| 2025 | 26th Iris Awards | Best Actor | Wrong Side of the Tracks | Nominated | |

== Personal life ==
Coronado has had relationships with Spanish beauty queen Amparo Muñoz, as well as Isabel Pantoja, Paola Dominguín, Esther Cañadas, and Mónica Molina.

He had one son (Nicolás Coronado) with Paola Dominguín and one daughter with Mónica Molina.
