= Warner Sogefilms =

Spanish film distributor

Warner Sogefilms AIE
- Type: Joint venture
- Industry: Film distribution
- Founded: 1998; 28 years ago
- Defunct: 2005; 21 years ago

Warner Sogefilms was a film distribution label in Spain active from 1998 to 2005.

It was created in January 1998 as a joint venture of Sogecable (Prisa) and Warner Bros., bringing the demise of Sogepaq Distribución (a previous joint venture of Prisa and Polygram) and Warner Española (the former Spanish subsidiary of Warner Bros.). It took the legal form of Economic Interest Grouping (AIE). 1998 Warner Sogefilms titles include Barrio, The Miracle of P. Tinto, and The Stolen Years. It split up in 2005. Already in liquidation, Warner Sogefilms was handed a €2.4 million fine by the CNMC for having coordinated with other film majors to standardize their commercial policies.

== Filmography ==
Release Date	Title	Notes
September 11, 1998	The Stolen Years	First film
October 8, 1998	Barrio	produced by Elías Querejeta P.C., Mact Productions, Sogetel and MGN Filmes
December 18, 1998	The Miracle of P. Tinto	produced by Sogetel and Películas Pendelton
April 16, 1999	All About My Mother	produced by El Deseo and Renn Productions
September 3, 1999	Jealousy	
September 24, 1999	Butterfly's Tongue	
November 26, 1999	Nobody Knows Anybody	
February 11, 2000	Cascabel	
September 29, 2000	Plenilune	
October 6, 2000	Fugitives	
October 18, 2000	800 Bullets	
December 1, 2000	Kisses for Everyone	
April 20, 2001	The Devil's Backbone	
August 24, 2001	Sex and Lucia	produced by Sogecine
September 28, 2001	Mad Love	
November 9, 2001	Intacto	
March 1, 2002	In the City Without Limits	
March 15, 2002	Talk to Her	
August 23, 2002	Box 507	
September 27, 2002	Mondays in the Sun	
January 10, 2003	South from Granada	
February 7, 2003	Mortadelo & Filemon: The Big Adventure	
February 21, 2003	Nobody's Life	
August 22, 2003	Chill Out!	
November 7, 2003	Flying Saucers	
March 19, 2004	Bad Education	
April 30, 2004	Tuna and Chocolate	Produced by Maestranza Films
May 7, 2004	Héctor	
September 3, 2004	The Sea Inside	
September 24, 2004	Hours of Light	
October 22, 2004	Crimen Ferpecto	
December 3, 2004	The Amazing World of Borjamari and Pocholo	
September 2, 2005	Princesas	
November 4, 2005	The Hidden	Final film
