= Mondays in the Sun =

2002 Spanish film by Fernando León de Aranoa

- Theatrical release poster
- Spanish: Los lunes al sol
- Directed by: Fernando León de Aranoa
- Written by: Ignacio del Moral; Fernando León de Aranoa
- Produced by: Elías Querejeta; Jaume Roures
- Starring: Javier Bardem; Luis Tosar; José Ángel Egido; Nieve de Medina; Enrique Villén; Celso Bugallo; Joaquín Climent; Aida Folch; Serge Riaboukine
- Cinematography: Alfredo F. Mayo
- Edited by: Nacho Ruiz Capillas
- Music by: Lucio Godoy
- Production companies: Elías Querejeta PC; Mediapro; Quo Vadis Cinema; Eyescreen; Televisión de Galicia; Continental Producciones
- Distributed by: Warner Sogefilms
- Release dates: September 2002 (Zinemaldia); 27 September 2002 (Spain)
- Running time: 114 minutes
- Countries: Spain; France; Italy
- Language: Spanish
- Budget: $3.4 million
- Box office: $13.5 million

Mondays in the Sun (Spanish: Los lunes al sol) is a 2002 drama film co-written and directed by Fernando León de Aranoa and starring Javier Bardem, Luis Tosar and José Ángel Egido. The film depicts the degrading effects of unemployment on a group of men left jobless by the closure of the shipyards in Vigo, Galicia. It was selected as the Spanish entry for the Best Foreign Language Film at the 75th Academy Awards, but it was not nominated.

== Plot ==
After the closure of their shipyard in Northern Spain, a few former workers – Santa, José, Lino, Amador, Serguei and Reina – keep in touch. They meet mainly at a bar owned by their former colleague Rico. Santa is the most superficially confident and the unofficial leader of the group, who dreams of one day going to Australia. A court case hangs over him that concerns a shipyard streetlamp he smashed during a protest against the closure, which he claims to not want to pay, not because of the financial cost but of what it stands for. José is bitter that his wife, Ana, is employed while he is not. The gap between them is widening and he is fearful that she will leave him for a co-worker. Despite arthritic legs, Ana endures night shifts at a fish factory and thinks her looks are now lost. Not everyone seems to agree, including her boss. Lino, an aging family man, doggedly pursues positions beyond his qualifications. The oldest member of the group, Amador, has degenerated into alcoholism after being abandoned by his wife; maintaining an increasingly transparent pretense that his wife will soon return from holiday. Reina has managed to find a job as a watchman at a football club, smuggling his friends into a game. Lino attends job interviews despite applicants being near his son's age. This group of friends is observed by Nata, the landlord's teenage daughter who franchises her babysitting job to Santa. While babysitting, Santa invites his friends around to have a few beers outside where Serguei claims his career as an astronaut was forestalled by economic measures in the Soviet Space program.

One night at the bar, Amador drinks too much and has to be assisted home by Santa, the two of whom share a long and meaningful conversation on the way back. As a result of his drunken state and the newly deepened friendship, Amador, who has never allowed any of the group to go inside his 4th floor apartment, lets Santa in to help him upstairs. After putting Amador to bed, Santa goes to wash some glasses only to find that there is no running water, leading him to explore the apartment which he sees is rundown and in a state hardly better than if he were living on the street.

Santa finally agrees to pay off the debt in court. After driving off with his lawyer, they drive past the newly repaired streetlamp where Santa tells the lawyer to pull over. Santa leaves the car, walks over to the lamp and smashes it again before driving off.

Later that night, Santa goes to Amador's house to collect him to go to the bar but gets no response at the door. The flickering light above him brings attention to a partially caved-in roof. Santa steps backwards slowly, realising that the damage to the roof is due to Amador having jumped from his window while drunk, killing himself. His friends give him a dignified funeral albeit with a stolen floral arrangement. Meanwhile, Ana is at home packing in preparation to leave José. She waits for him on the couch with her bag on the floor. Upon returning from the funeral, José sits on the couch and lays across Ana's lap, telling her about the funeral and trying to make amends for the fighting they've been doing. Ana pities him and begins to cry as well, placing a blanket over her bag and deciding to stay without José ever knowing she had intended to leave.

That same day, Lino is waiting in line for another job interview and before being called for his turn, he looks ahead seeing a reflection of himself, ultimately deciding that he is wasting his time looking for employment in such places.

At night, the friends meet up again in the bar with the ashes of Amador and after pouring 'one last drink' in his urn, they make a decision and set off to spread the ashes. The friends go down to the shipyard and eventually find the ferry that they always took together and where it is implied that they met. Two of the men climb on board while the other two stand guard. The two on-board break into the cabin and find a way to start the ferry. Once they get it started, the other two climb aboard and they set off for the middle of the passage. Upon getting there, they realise that each one of them thought another had brought the urn and that they had left it behind. They chortle. The group of friends stay out all night in the middle of the passage without any cares and by morning there is a large crowd around the ferry terminal watching the men from afar. The men chat casually while sitting in the morning sun as the credits begin to roll.

== Cast ==
- Javier Bardem as Santa
- Luis Tosar as José Suárez
- José Ángel Egido as Paulino "Lino" Rivas
- Nieve de Medina as Ana
- Serge Riaboukine as Serguei
- Enrique Villén as Reina
- Celso Bugallo as Amador
- Joaquín Climent as Rico
- Aida Folch as Nata
- Fernando Tejero as Lázaro
- Laura Domínguez as Ángela

== Production ==
A Spanish-French-Italian co-production, Mondays in the Sun was produced by Elías Querejeta PC (Elías Querejeta) and Mediapro (Jaume Roures), alongside Quo Vadis Cinema (Jérôme Vidal), Eyescreen (Andrea Occhipinti), and Televisión de Galicia, in association with Continental Producciones (Pancho Casal), with the participation of Vía Digital and Antena 3. Shooting locations included Vigo.

== Release ==
The film screened at the 50th San Sebastián International Film Festival in September 2002. It was theatrically released in Spain on 27 September 2002.

== Reception ==
=== Critical response ===
Mondays in the Sun has an approval rating of 80% on review aggregator website Rotten Tomatoes, based on 70 reviews, and an average rating of 7/10. The website's critical consensus states: "Javier Bardem gives an outstanding performance in this thought-provoking (though occasionally plodding) movie about the effects of unemployment on a group of former shipyard workers". Metacritic assigned the film a weighted average score of 64 out of 100, based on 28 critics, indicating "generally favorable reviews".

Jonathan Holland of Variety deemed the film to be "a powerful parable about unemployed men", "a tough-but-tender movie driven by perfectly modulated performances, an accomplished script and naturalistic dialogue".

Manuel Vázquez Montalbán considered the film to be a "great film about the defeats of the 20th century and the difficulty of building secular hopes for the 21st [century]".

Ángel Fernández-Santos of El País deemed Mondays in the Sun to be "a vibrant and beautiful film that contains a magnificent collective work", "a film of great distinction, a vigorous and seemingly linear story, but one of those that under its apparent simplicity, it touches on the major issues of people's lives in any part of the world", otherwise also writing about its "diaphanous script, bordering on perfection".

Mirito Torreiro of Fotogramas rated the film 5 out of 5 stars, highlighting "the actors, all of them" as the film's standout, but [singling out] Bardem's performance in particular as simply amazing.

=== Awards and nominations ===
The Academy of Cinematographic Arts and Sciences of Spain chose the film as Spain's submission to the 75th Academy Awards (over Talk to Her, which was nominated for the Academy Award for Best Director and won Best Original Screenplay), and to the 46th Ariel Awards.

Year	Award	Category	Nominee(s)	Result	Ref.
2002	50th San Sebastián International Film Festival	Golden Shell		Won	
2002	15th European Film Awards	Best European Actor	Javier Bardem	Nominated	
2003	17th Goya Awards	Best Film		Won	
2003	17th Goya Awards	Best Director	Fernando León de Aranoa	Won	
2003	17th Goya Awards	Best Original Screenplay	Fernando León de Aranoa, Ignacio del Moral	Nominated	
2003	17th Goya Awards	Best Actor	Javier Bardem	Won	
2003	17th Goya Awards	Best Supporting Actor	Luis Tosar	Won	
2003	17th Goya Awards	Best New Actor	José Ángel Egido	Won	
2003	17th Goya Awards	Best New Actress	Nieve de Medina	Nominated	
2003	17th Goya Awards	Best Editing	Nacho Ruiz Capillas	Nominated	
2003	8th Forqué Awards	Best Film		Won	
2004	46th Ariel Awards	Best Ibero-American Film		Won	
2004	49th David di Donatello Awards	Best European Film		Nominated	

== DVD release ==
Mondays in the Sun is available on DVD in Spain by Universal Pictures Home Entertainment on July 16, 2003 and in the US by Lionsgate Home Entertainment on October 28, 2003. It was released in Spain and in the United States. The film is in Spanish with English subtitles.

== See also ==
- List of Spanish films of 2002
- List of Spanish submissions for the Academy Award for Best International Feature Film
- List of submissions to the 75th Academy Awards for Best Foreign Language Film
