= Poniente (film) =

- Theatrical release poster
- Directed by: Chus Gutiérrez
- Written by: Icíar Bollaín; Chus Gutiérrez
- Starring: José Coronado; Cuca Escribano; Mariola Fuentes; Antonio Dechent; Farid Fatmi
- Cinematography: Carles Gusi
- Edited by: Fernando Pardo
- Music by: Tao Gutiérrez
- Production companies: Olmo Films; Amboto Audiovisual
- Distributed by: Araba Films
- Release dates: 1 September 2002 (Venice); 13 September 2002 (Spain)
- Country: Spain
- Language: Spanish

Poniente is a 2002 Spanish film directed by Chus Gutiérrez and co-written by Icíar Bollaín which stars Cuca Escribano and José Coronado alongside Mariola Fuentes, Antonio Dechent and Farid Fatmi.

== Plot ==
The 2000 El Ejido race riots provide the backdrop for this fictional account. Upon Lucía's return to her hometown of "La Isla" in the province of Almería and taking possession of a greenhouse inherited from her deceased father, she is witness to a concerning situation at the intensive farming complex in the province, featuring abuse inflicted on the North-African undocumented immigrant labourers, who live under deplorable conditions. This situation pits her against her cousin Miguel while bonds her closer to Curro (a migrant returned from Switzerland who presses for better conditions for the workers) and Perla, a prostitute.

== Cast ==
- Cuca Escribano as Lucía
- Antonio Dechent as Miguel
- José Coronado as Curro
- Farid Fatmi as Adbembi
- Antonio de la Torre as Paquito
- Mariola Fuentes as Perla
- Idilio Cardoso as Pepe
- Marouane Mbribti as Saïd
- Alfonsa Rosso as María

== Production ==
The screenplay was penned by Chus Gutiérrez in collaboration with Icíar Bollaín. The film was produced by Olmo Films and Amboto Audiovisual, with the participation of Antena 3 and Vía Digital. Shooting locations included Torrenueva (province of Granada) and Cabo de Gata (province of Almería).

== Release ==
Picked up for the 'Upstream' (Controcorrente) section lineup of the 59th Venice International Film Festival, the film was presented on 1 September 2002 at the aforementioned festival. It also screened at the 27th Toronto International Film Festival later in September. Distributed by Araba Films, the film was theatrically released in Spain on 13 September 2002.

== Reception ==
Jonathan Holland of Variety assessed Poniente to be Gutiérrez' "strongest film to date", a "socially committed, dexterously plotted drama" and "an all-too-rare Spanish take on the issue of racism in Europe".

Mirito Torreiro of Fotogramas scored 3 out of 5 stars, writing that the film takes a firm stance in favour of the dispossessed, while resenting the film's excessive "schematism".

== See also ==
- List of Spanish films of 2002

== Bibliography ==
- Castiello, Chema (2005). Los parias de la tierra. Inmigrantes en el cine español (PDF). Madrid: Talasa Ediciones. ISBN 84-96266-11-7.
- Torres Hortelano, Lorenzo Javier (2008). "Poniente (2002) de Chus Gutiérrez. "En España no hay racismo"". Miradas sobre el pasado y presente en el cine español (1990-2005). pp. 193–210. ISSN 0925-8620 – via Universidad Rey Juan Carlos.
- Vega-Durán, Raquel (2013). "United Spains? North African Immigration and the Question of Spanish Identity in Poniente". Afro-Hispanic Review. 32 (1): 159–180. JSTOR 23617263.
