= Smoking Room (film) =

- Theatrical release poster
- Directed by: Julio D. Wallovits; Roger Gual
- Written by: Julio D. Wallovits; Roger Gual
- Starring: Antonio Dechent; Juan Diego; Ulises Dumont; Eduard Fernández; Francesc Garrido; Miguel Ángel González; Chete Lera; Juan Loriente; Pep Molina; Manuel Morón; Francesc Orella; Vicki Peña
- Cinematography: Cobi Migliora
- Edited by: David Gallardo
- Production companies: El Sindicato; Oviedo TV; DeAPlaneta
- Distributed by: DeAPlaneta
- Release dates: 2002 (Málaga); 14 June 2002 (Spain)
- Country: Spain
- Language: Spanish

Smoking Room is a 2002 Spanish film written and directed by Julio D. Wallovits and Roger Gual.

== Plot ==
The plot concerns the miseries and intrigues unravelling among the employees of a company ensuing with the decision taken by one of them (Ramírez) to file a request for the creation of a smoking room in the office.

== Cast ==
- Manuel Morón as Rubio
- Ulises Dumont as Armero
- Antonio Dechent as Enrique
- Chete Lera as Puig
- Vicky Peña as Marta
- Eduard Fernández as Ramírez
- Juan Loriente as Coral
- Juan Diego as Sotomayor
- Francesc Orella as Martínez
- Pep Molina as Gómez
- Francesc Garrido as Fernández
- Miguel Ángel González as Messenger

== Production ==
The film was produced by El Sindicato alongside Oviedo TV and DeAPlaneta.

== Release ==
The film screened at the Málaga Film Festival. Distributed by DeAPlaneta, it was theatrically released in Spain on 14 June 2002.

== Reception ==
Mirito Torreiro of Fotogramas rated the film 4 out of 5 stars, extolling the dialogues, "the best ones heard in a Spanish film for many years".

Jonathan Holland of Variety presented Smoking Room as a "low-budget, high-talent debut" that is "a witty X-ray of male office workers living their lives in quiet (and not so quiet) desperation".

== Accolades ==
Year	Award	Category	Nominee(s)	Result	Ref.
2002	5th Málaga Film Festival	Best Screenplay		Won	
2002	5th Málaga Film Festival	Best Male Performance	The entire (male) cast	Won	
2002	5th Málaga Film Festival	Jury's Special Prize		Won	
2002	15th European Film Awards	European Discovery of the Year		Nominated	
2003	17th Goya Awards	Best New Director	Julio Wallovits, Roger Gual	Won	
2003	17th Goya Awards	Best Original Screenplay	Julio Wallovits, Roger Gual	Nominated	

== See also ==
- List of Spanish films of 2002
