= In the City Without Limits =

- Theatrical release poster
- Spanish: En la ciudad sin límites
- Directed by: Antonio Hernández
- Written by: Enrique Brasó; Antonio Hernández
- Produced by: José Nolla
- Starring: Leonardo Sbaraglia; Fernando Fernán Gómez; Geraldine Chaplin; Ana Fernández
- Cinematography: Unax Mendía
- Edited by: Patricia Enis; Javier Laffaille
- Music by: Víctor Reyes
- Production companies: Icónica; Patagonik Film Group; Zebra Producciones
- Distributed by: Warner Sogefilms (Spain); Buena Vista International (Argentina)
- Release dates: 12 February 2002 (Berlinale); 1 March 2002 (Spain); 26 June 2003 (Argentina)
- Running time: 125 minutes
- Countries: Spain; Argentina
- Languages: Spanish; French

In the City Without Limits (Spanish: En la ciudad sin límites) is a 2002 thriller drama film directed by Antonio Hernández and starring Leonardo Sbaraglia, Fernando Fernán Gómez and Geraldine Chaplin.

The film received five nominations to the 17th Goya Awards, winning Best Original Screenplay and Best Supporting Actress (Chaplin).

== Synopsis ==
A young man, Victor, arrives in Paris where his family have gathered around his seriously ill father Max, a former mogul now deteriorating physically and mentally. Max begins to behave very strangely, as his memories and those of Spain's past begin to cloud his mind. He becomes terrified of the staff taking care of him and tries to escape from the clinic in order to find a man named Rancel. The rest of his family assume Max is mad and quickly begin to squabble of dividing up his inheritance, but Victor becomes convinced that his father is being troubled by real events, and is resolved to find out why.

== Cast ==
- Leonardo Sbaraglia as Victor
- Fernando Fernán Gómez as Max
- Geraldine Chaplin as Marie
- Ana Fernández as Carmen
- Adriana Ozores as Pilar
- Leticia Brédice as Eileen
- Alfredo Alcón as Rancel
- Mónica Estarreado as Beatriz
- Alex Casanovas as Alberto

== Release ==
The film premiered at the 52nd Berlin International Film Festival on 12 February 2002 and was released theatrically in Spain on 1 March that year.

== See also ==
- List of Spanish films of 2002
- List of Argentine films of 2003
