= Flying Saucers (film) =

- Theatrical release poster
- Spanish: Platillos volantes
- Directed by: Óscar Aibar
- Screenplay by: Óscar Aibar; Jorge Guerricaechevarría
- Produced by: Pedro Costa; Enrique Cerezo
- Starring: Ángel de Andrés López; Jordi Vilches
- Cinematography: Mario Montero
- Edited by: Fernando Pardo
- Music by: Javier Navarrete
- Production companies: Didac Films; Enrique Cerezo PC
- Distributed by: Warner Sogefilms
- Release date: 7 November 2003
- Country: Spain
- Language: Spanish

Flying Saucers (Spanish: Platillos volantes) is a 2003 Spanish science fiction comedy-drama film directed by Óscar Aibar from a screenplay by Aibar and Jorge Guerricaechevarría which stars Ángel de Andrés López and Jordi Vilches. The plot premise is based on real events.

== Plot ==
In 1972 Spain, two decapitated corpses are found on the train tracks near Terrassa together with a note reading "The extraterrestrials are calling us. We belong to infinity". The plot goes on to explore the stories of the deceased, following textile workers Juan and José, with their lives falling apart upon developing a keen interest on UFO sightings.

== Cast ==
- Ángel de Andrés López as José
- Jordi Vilches as Juan
- Macarena Gómez as María
- José Luis Adserías as Amador
- Pere Ponce as Individuo vigila 1
- Berta Ojea as Sra. Botifoll
- Juan Margallo as Boris
- Àngels Poch as Antonia
- Leo Bassi as Sr. Karma

== Production ==
The film is a Didac Films and Enrique Cerezo PC production. Shooting locations included Terrassa.

== Release ==
Distributed by Warner Sogefilms, the film was released theatrically in Spain on 7 November 2003.

== Reception ==
Fernando Méndez-Leite of Fotogramas rated the film 4 out of 5 stars highlighting "the mastery of dramatic materials in an impeccable script" as the best thing about the film.

Casimiro Torreiro of El País deemed the film to be "a very well-written film, and even better put into images" yet featuring an "absurd last sequence" throwing away the previous work.

== See also ==
- List of Spanish films of 2003
