= Lisístrata =

- Region 2 DVD cover
- Directed by: Francesc Bellmunt
- Written by: Francesc Bellmunt (script); Ralf König (comic)
- Produced by: Ramon Tello & Marc Martí
- Starring: Maribel Verdú; Juan Luis Galiardo; Javier Gurruchaga
- Cinematography: Julián Elizalde
- Edited by: Jaume Martí
- Music by: An Der Beat
- Distributed by: Laurenfilm S.A.
- Release date: September 13, 2002
- Running time: 89 minutes
- Country: Spain
- Languages: Spanish, Catalan
- Budget: €3,000,000 (estimated)

Lisístrata is a 2002 Spanish comedy film directed by Francesc Bellmunt. It is based on a comic book by the German cartoonist Ralf König, which in turn is loosely based on the play Lysistrata by Aristophanes.

== Plot ==
It is the year 411 BC and the Peloponnesian War between Sparta (among others) and Athens has been raging for some 20 years. The women who want to see the conflict finally ended use a trick to make their husbands comply: led by the Feminist Lisístrata (Maribel Verdú), they barricade themselves on the Acropolis, where the Athenian treasure is kept, and refuse to have sex with their husbands until peace is restored.

The men soon sport gigantic erections, which as in Aristophanes' play are depicted by huge prosthetics that protrude from under the actors' clothes. This unfortunate state of "blue balls" hinders them in their capacity to fight. Luckily, the Spartans have the same problem.

To the rescue comes Hepatitos (Juan Luis Galiardo), the local homosexual and transvestite, who disguises himself as a medical doctor and advises the generals to order circumstantial homosexuality as a way to relieve the pressure in their men.

At first, the soldiers refuse, but quickly warm up to the idea — and soon everyone lives rather happily in male–male relationships. The women are not amused by this, as their plan has been foiled. However, as the soldiers begin to fall in love with enemy soldiers instead of fighting them, peace is finally established. The women end their strike (not to the delight of all men) and it is hinted that in the future, homosexual and heterosexual relationships will be regarded as relatively exchangeable.

While the film is primarily a bawdy comedy (even more so than the Greek play), it also contains interesting tidbits of historic truth, such as a relatively accurate life-size replica of the Pallas Athene statue by Phidias in the Parthenon.

The scene in which one soldier is about to kill an enemy fighter, but is moved by his beauty so much that he spares him and arranges a tête-à-tête with him after the battle, can be seen as being based on the legend of Achilles and Troilus, son of Priam.

== Cast ==
- Maribel Verdú as Lisístrata
- Juan Luis Galiardo as Hepatitos
- Javier Gurruchaga as Ajax
- Jesús Bonilla as Cinesias
- Teté Delgado (billed as Tete Delgado) as Mirrina
- Aitor Mazo as General Termos
- Glòria Cano as Sabrina
- Eduardo Antuña as Harpix
- Antonio Belart as Potax
- Cristina Solà as Lampito
- Anna Maria Barbany (billed as Anna Mª Barbany) as Papila
- Albert Trifol as General Bonus
- Sonia Ferrer (billed as Sònia Ferrer) as Cleonice
- Sergio Pazos as Oficial Bitón
- José Corbacho as Soldado Lico

== See also ==
- List of Spanish films of 2002
