= Nobody's Life =

- Theatrical release poster
- Spanish: La vida de nadie
- Directed by: Eduard Cortés
- Screenplay by: Eduard Cortés; Piti Español
- Produced by: Enrique Cerezo; Pedro Costa
- Starring: José Coronado; Adriana Ozores; Roberto Álvarez; Marta Etura; Adrián Portugal
- Cinematography: José Luis Alcaine
- Edited by: Fernando Pardo
- Music by: Xavi Capellas
- Production companies: Pedro Costa PC; Enrique Cerezo PC
- Distributed by: Warner Sogefilms
- Release dates: 27 October 2002 (Seminci); 21 February 2003 (Spain)
- Country: Spain
- Language: Spanish

Nobody's Life (Spanish: La vida de nadie) is a 2002 Spanish film directed and co-written by Eduard Cortés which stars José Coronado and Adriana Ozores alongside Roberto Álvarez, Marta Etura and Adrián Portugal.

The plot sweetens the real-life story of Jean-Claude Romand, otherwise also fictionalised in Time Out (2001), and The Adversary (2002).

== Plot ==
The plot is inspired by the story of Jean-Claude Romand. It is set in bourgeois neighborhood in Madrid. Emilio Barrero holds a seemingly successful life that is nothing but a lie. The farce begins to crumble upon his infatuation with a young female student, Rosana.

== Cast ==
- José Coronado as Emilio Barrero
- Adriana Ozores as Ágata
- Roberto Álvarez as José
- Marta Etura as Rosana
- Adrián Portugal as Sergio

== Production ==
The screenplay was penned by Eduard Cortés and Piti Español. The film is a Pedro Costa PC and Enrique Cerezo PC production.

== Release ==
The film premiered at the 47th Valladolid International Film Festival in October 2002. It received a theatrical release in Spain on 21 February 2003.

== Reception ==
Ángel Fernández-Santos of El País pointed out that Cortés "dodges the brutal and bloodthirsty side" of the original subject, delivering a film "that borders on blandness but avoids it with cleverness and ease", also highlighting Ozores' "masterful" performance as a cheated wife.

Mirito Torreiro of Fotogramas rated the film 3 out of 5 stars highlighting the Ozores vs. Coronado acting duel as the best thing about the film, while citing "a cowardly and predictable ending" as the worst thing about it.

== Accolades ==
| Year | Award | Category | Nominee(s) | Result | Ref. |
|---|---|---|---|---|---|
| 2002 | 47th Valladolid International Film Festival | Best Actress | Adriana Ozores | Won | |
| 2003 | 17th Goya Awards | Best New Director | Eduard Cortés | Nominated | |
| 2003 | 17th Goya Awards | Best Actress | Adriana Ozores | Nominated | |
| 2003 | 17th Goya Awards | Best New Actress | Marta Etura | Nominated | |

== See also ==
- List of Spanish films of 2003
