= List of Portuguese films of 2002 =

A list of Portuguese films that were first released in 2002.

Release date	Title	Director	Cast	Genre	Notes	Ref
January 4	A Bomba	Leonel Vieira				
January 15	Water and Salt	Teresa Villaverde				
January 15	O Gotejar da Luz	Fernando Vendrell			Entered into the 2002 Berlin Film Festival	
January 18	António, Um Rapaz de Lisboa	Jorge Silva Melo				
March 15	Oporto of My Childhood	Manoel de Oliveira				
March 19	Ilusíada	Leonor Areal				
April 12	O Fato Completo ou Á Proura de Alberto	Inês de Medeiros				
April 19	The Dauphin	Fernando Lopes				
May 10	Aparelho Voador a Baixa Altitude	Solveig Nordlund				
June 6	Under Strange Skies	Daniel Blaufuks				
September 13	Em Volta	Ivo M. Ferreira				
October 25	The Fault	João Mário Grilo				
November 1	The Forest	Leonel Vieira				
November 11	The Stone Raft	George Sluizer				
November 15	The Uncertainty Principle	Manoel de Oliveira			Entered into the 2002 Cannes Film Festival	
December 27	Forget Everything I Told You	António Ferreira				

== See also ==
- 2002 in Portugal
