= Javier García Sánchez =

Spanish writer (born 1955)

- Born: 1955 (age 70–71); Barcelona
- Education: Complutense University
- Occupation: Writer
- Writing career
- Notable work: La dama del viento sur
- Notable awards: Premio Pío Baroja

Javier García Sánchez is a Spanish writer. Born in Barcelona in 1955, he studied at the Complutense University in Madrid. He edited the magazine Quimera for two years, and wrote in the culture pages of La Voz de Euskadi. He achieved literary success with his second novel La dama del viento sur (Lady of the South Wind), which won the Premio Pío Baroja and was translated into English by Michael Bradburn Ruster and Myrna R. Villa. He won the Premio Herralde with a later novel La historia más triste. His book on the champion road cyclist Miguel Indurain has been translated into English.
