= Common Ground (2002 film) =

- Directed by: Adolfo Aristarain
- Written by: Adolfo Aristarain; Lorenzo F. Aristarain; Kathy Saavedra
- Produced by: Adolfo Aristarain; Joasean Gómez; Gerardo Herrero
- Starring: Federico Luppi; Mercedes Sampietro; Arturo Puig
- Cinematography: Porfirio Enríquez
- Edited by: Fernando Pardo
- Distributed by: Transmundo Films
- Release dates: September 12, 2002 (Argentina); September 20, 2002 (Spain)
- Running time: 115 minutes
- Countries: Argentina; Spain; Uruguay
- Language: Spanish

Common Ground (Spanish: Lugares comunes) is a 2002 drama film co-written, co-produced and directed by Adolfo Aristarain. The film marks the seventh collaboration between Aristarain and actor Federico Luppi. It also stars Mercedes Sampietro and Arturo Puig.

== Synopsis ==
After being forced to retire, literature professor Fernando Robles (Federico Luppi) and his wife Liliana (Mercedes Sampietro) are forced to reevaluate their lives and make major changes in them. These include setting the record straight with their son, exiled in Madrid and starting out a new life. They decide to buy a small lavender farm in Córdoba from a widowed man, Zacarías, and with the aid of their lawyer friend Carlos (Arturo Puig), attempt to start out their new business.

Along the way, Fernando, an aspiring writer himself, jots down notes and ideas for a novel in a book, which he frequently narrates in voice-overs. But this attempt at a new life is cut short when Fernando suddenly contracts pneumonia one cold night on the mountains. He is hospitalized and dies over a week, with enough time to bid farewell to his family and tell his wife all he never said out loud.

Liliana rejects the help of the sympathetic Carlos and the offer from her son Pedro to come live with his family in Spain. She opts to carry on her late husband's attempt of a new life, and stays in the farm Fernando helped rebuild.

== Cast ==
- Federico Luppi ... Fernando Robles
- Mercedes Sampietro ... Liliana Rovira
- Arturo Puig ... Carlos Sulla
- Carlos Santamaria ... Pedro Robles
- Valentina Bassi ... Natacha
- Claudio Rissi ... Demedio

== Awards and nomination ==
Award	Category	Subject	Result
Argentinean Film Critics Association Awards	Best Actor	Federico Luppi	Nominated
Argentinean Film Critics Association Awards	Best Actress	Mercedes Sampietro	Nominated
Argentinean Film Critics Association Awards	Best Art Direction	Abel Facello	Nominated
Argentinean Film Critics Association Awards	Best Director	Adolfo Aristarain	Nominated
Argentinean Film Critics Association Awards	Best Film		Nominated
Argentinean Film Critics Association Awards	Best Screenplay	Adolfo Aristarain, Kathy Saavedra	Nominated
Argentinean Film Critics Association Awards	Best Supporting Actor	Claudio Rissi	Nominated
Butaca Awards	Best Film Actress	Mercedes Sampietro	Won
Cartagena Film Festival	Best Film	Adolfo Aristarain	Nominated
Cinema Writers Circle Awards	Best Actress	Mercedes Sampietro	Won
Cinema Writers Circle Awards	Best Screenplay	Kathy Saavedra	Nominated
Fotogramas de Plata	Best Actress	Mercedes Sampietro	Nominated
Fribourg International Film Festival	Audience Award	Adolfo Aristarain	Won
Fribourg International Film Festival	Grand Prix	Adolfo Aristarain	Nominated
Goya Awards	Best Actress	Mercedes Sampietro	Won
Goya Awards	Best Screenplay	Kathy Saavedro	Won
Gramado Film Festival	Best Actress	Mercedes Sampietro	Won
Gramado Film Festival	Best Film		Nominated
Havana Film Festival	Glauber Rocha Award	Adolfo Aristarain	Won
Havana Film Festival	OCIC Award	Adolfo Aristarain	Won
Havana Film Festival	Vigia Award	Adolfo Aristarain	Won
San Sebastián International Film Festival	Best Screenplay	Kathy Saavedra	Won
San Sebastián International Film Festival	Best Actress	Mercedes Sampietro	Won
San Sebastián International Film Festival	Golden Seashell	Adolfo Aristarain	Nominated
Sant Jordi Awards	Best Spanish Actress	Mercedes Sampietro	Won
Spanish Actors Union	Best Lead Performance - Female	Mercedes Sampietro	Won

== See also ==
- List of Spanish films of 2002
