= GAL (film) =

- Directed by: Miguel Courtois
- Starring: José Garcia; Natalia Verbeke
- Release date: 3 November 2006
- Running time: 1h 45min
- Country: Spain
- Languages: Spanish; French

GAL is a 2006 Spanish drama film directed by Miguel Courtois. Inspired by true events, GAL follows the investigation by journalists of the anti-terrorist GAL death squads established illegally by officials of the Spanish government to fight the ETA separatist group from 1983 to 1992.

== Cast ==
- José Garcia - Manuel Mallo
- Natalia Verbeke - Marta Castillo
- Jordi Mollà - Paco Ariza
- Ana Álvarez - Soledad Muñoz
- Mercè Llorens - Gracia
- Abel Folk - Pablo Codina
