= Salomé (2002 film) =

- Directed by: Carlos Saura
- Written by: Carlos Saura
- Starring: Aída Gómez, Pere Arquillué, Paco Mora, Javier Toca, Carmen Villena
- Cinematography: Teo Delgado, José Luis López-Linares
- Edited by: Julian Juaniz
- Music by: Roque Baños, Tomasito
- Distributed by: Prestige Films
- Release date: 22 November 2002
- Running time: 85 minutes
- Country: Spain
- Language: Spanish

Salomé is a 2002 Spanish film directed by Carlos Saura. The film is told from the perspective of a flamenco dance company that will mount a show devoted to the mythical and biblical figure of Salomé, as a story of love and vengeance. The movie is both about the performance and the preparation for it.

== Plot ==
The first part of the film is conceived as a documentary and we discover, step-by-step, the whole construction and preparation of the show. A director prepares a troupe of flamenco dancers for a production of the biblical story of Salome. He summarizes the story and describes his spring for the drama's action: Salomé's attraction to John the Baptist. When the prophet rejects her, she seeks revenge. We are witnessing the working sessions with the musician, the choosing of the costumes. The score composer, set designer, choreographer and costume designer are shown doing their jobs in the part of the stage. We also see the troupe of dancers during rehearsals.

We meet the principals. We watch the troupe on rehearsals, and then the performance. The main dancers are presented: Salomé, King Herod (Herod Antipas), John the Baptist and Herodias. Each of them tells the story of their beginnings as dancers in childhood. Salomé overcame a bad case of scoliosis to eventually succeed as a dancer and now she is the director of the Spanish National ballet company. John the Baptist has emigrated from his native Cuba and both Herod and Herodias had to confront initial unwillingness by their parents to allow them to follow a career as dancers.

The second part of the film is the production of the stage dance adaptation of Salomé. It is a lush presentation in a spare stage, colorfully illuminated. We follow the plot.

King Herod has married Herodias, his brother's widow. Herod is devoted to his stepdaughter Salomé. On his birthday celebration, he wants to maker her to dance for him, but she refuses. Herodias encourages her daughter to do so; allowing her daughter to be the lust interest of her husband. However, Salomé refuses because she is only interested in John the Baptist, whom on the other hand Herod fears. Salomé tries to seduce the prophet, but his status as a holy man does not let him be carried away by his feelings. Disappointed and frustrated, Salomé agrees to dance for her stepfather. In a sensual and frantic performance, she takes on the dance of the seven veils. The king, fascinated by the dance, would give Salomé anything she asks for. He is surprised when Salomé requests, in defiance, the head of John the Baptist. The king, reluctantly, fulfills her wish. When the head of the saintly man is presented to Salomé on a tray, she realizes that she is still in love with him. Grief-stricken, Salomé commits suicide hanging herself.

== Cast ==
- Aída Gómez as Salomé
- Pere Arquillué as director
- Paco Mora as King Herod
- Javier Toca as John the Baptist
- Carmen Villena as Herodias

== See also ==
- List of Spanish films of 2002
