= Ana Fernández (actress, born 1963) =

Spanish actress

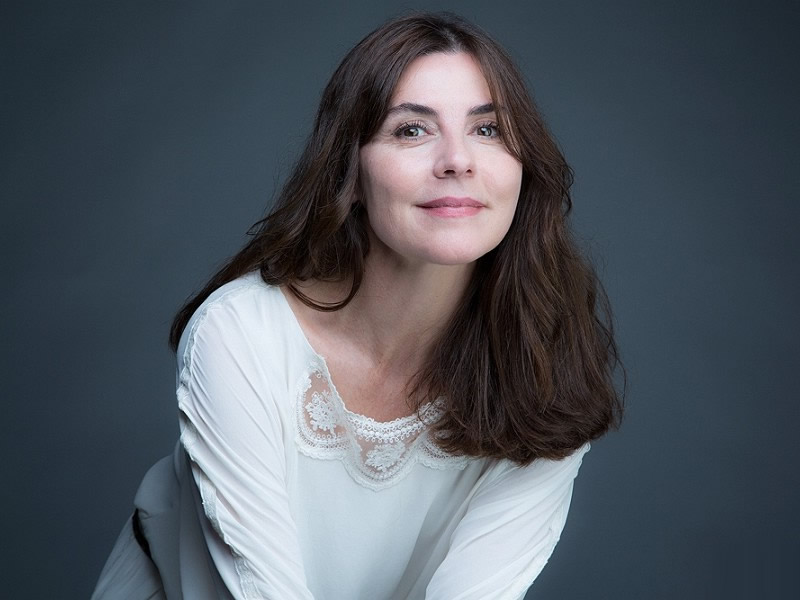
Ana Fernández

Ana Fernández (born 29 May 1965) is a Spanish actress. Born in Valencina de la Concepción, Seville, for her performance in Benito Zambrano's Solas in 1999 Fernández won the Goya Award for Best New Actress. She also appeared in Pedro Almodóvar's Talk to Her.

== Filmography ==
=== Film ===
Year	Title	Role	Notes	Ref
1998	Yerma	Lavandera		
1998	Tesoro	María	Short film	
1999	Solas	María		
2000	You're the One (una historia de entonces)	Pilara		
2000	Sé quién eres	Paloma		
2000	Vaivén		Short film	
2001	Bad Women	Candela		
2001	El apagón		Short film	
2002	Historia de un beso	Andrea		
2002	El hijo de John Lennon		Short film	
2002	La soledad era esto	Mercedes		
2002	Hable con ella	Hermana de Lydia		
2002	En la ciudad sin límites	Carmen		
2002	Reflejos	Julia		
2002	El resultado de la vida	Señora	Short film	
2004	Tiovivo c. 1950	Teresita		
2004	La promesa	Dorita		
2004	Tánger	Lidia		
2005	Pasos	Silvia		
2005	Morir en San Hilario	Esther		
2006	Pura sangre	Clara		
2006	Love in Self Defense	Adriana		
2006	Sin ti	Lucía		
2007	The Heart of the Earth	Mercedes		
2007	Lola	Rosario		
2008	Muñeca	Gabriela		
2008	Bienvenido a Farewell-Gutmann	Adela		
2010	Efímera	María	Short film	
2010	Vidas pequeñas	Bárbara Helguera		
2010	El grifo	Hija	Short film	
2010	Ni dios, ni patrón, ni marido			
2011	Sol		Short film	
2011	Acorralados	Eva Priaska		
2012	30 años de oscuridad		Documentary	
2012	Casi inocentes	Regina		
2012	Els nens salvatges	Rosa		
2013	Cuidado con lo que sueñas	Candela	Venezuelan film	
2014	La novia	Amiga de la familia		
2014	Purgatorio	Ana		
2018	Con el viento	Elena		
2019	Abuelos	Amalia		
2020	La suite nupcial	Elisa		

=== Television ===
Year	Title	Role	TV Station	Notes	Ref
1997	Todos los hombres sois iguales	Marta Reyes	Telecinco	1 episode	
1997	Los negocios de mamá	Azafata	La 1	1 episode	
2000	María: madre de Jesús	María			
2000	Policías, en el corazón de la calle	Lucía Ramos	Antena 3	14 episodes	
2003	La Mari	Mari	Canal Sur	2 episodes	
2003	Mónica	Mónica	-	TV movie	
2005	Falsa culpable	Isabel Costa		TV movie	
2007	Vida de familia	Marta		TV movie	
2008	Flor de mayo	Tona		TV movie	
2009	La Mari 2	Mari	Canal Sur	2 episodes	
2010	La Pola	Virreina Doña Francisca Villanova y Marco	Canal RCN		
2011	El ángel de Budapest	Sra. Tourné	La 1	TV movie	
2019	Brigada Costa del Sol	Alicia Mestre	Telecinco	12 episodes	
2020; 2022 - present	Servir y proteger	Diana del Val	La 1		
2022	Desconocidas	Blanca	Canal Sur	13 episodes	
