= My Mother Likes Women =

- Theatrical release poster
- Original title: A mi madre le gustan las mujeres
- Directed by: Inés París; Daniela Fejerman
- Screenplay by: Inés París; Daniela Fejerman
- Produced by: Fernando Colomo; Beatriz de la Gángara
- Starring: Leonor Watling; Rosa María Sardá; María Pujalte; Silvia Abascal; Eliska Sirova; Chisco Amado; Álex Angulo
- Cinematography: David Omedes
- Edited by: Fidel Collados
- Music by: Juan Bardem
- Distributed by: Lauren Films
- Release date: 11 January 2002 (Spain)
- Running time: 96 minutes
- Country: Spain
- Language: Spanish

My Mother Likes Women (Spanish: A mi Madre le gustan las mujeres) is a 2002 Spanish comedy film directed by Inés París and Daniela Fejerman. The film stars Leonor Watling, Rosa Maria Sardà, María Pujalte, Silvia Abascal, and Eliska Sirova. My Mother Likes Women premiered in Spain on 11 January 2002. The theme song of the same title was written by Andy Chango.

== Plot ==
Elvira, an attractive but insecure twenty-something, joins her sisters Jimena and Sol to celebrate the birthday of their mother, Sofía. A divorced concert pianist, Sofía announces that she's fallen in love but is interrupted by the doorbell as she describes her new partner. While the three gleefully speculate about their mother's new boyfriend, their joy suddenly gives way to shock when she returns with Eliska, and the sisters realize that their mother is a lesbian.

The young women handle the shock in different ways. Elvira confides in her psychiatrist, while Sol composes a song about her mother and her lesbian relationship for her band. Jimena doesn't act out in any similar manner, but her husband becomes concerned about how his mother-in-law's sexual orientation affects his image at work.

When her daughters find out that Sofía has given the much younger Eliska a significant amount of money, they become suspicious of Eliska and plot to find a way to get their mother to break up with her.

== Cast ==
- Leonor Watling as Elvira
- Rosa Maria Sardà as Sofía
- María Pujalte as Jimena
- Silvia Abascal as Sol
- Eliska Sirova as Eliska
- Chisco Amado as Miguel
- Álex Angulo as the book editor
- Aitor Mazo as psychiatrist
- Xabier Elorriaga as Carlos

== Release ==
=== Home media ===
The DVD, with English subtitles, was released in North America (Region 1) by Wolfe Video on May 10, 2005. A video of the theme song scene from the film appears on the Region 2 DVD as an extra feature, with the performance of the song by Andy Chango and Ariel Rot mixed into the footage.
