= Balseros (film) =

2002 documentary film by Carles Bosch and Josep Maria Domènech

- Directed by: Carles Bosch; Josep Maria Domènech
- Written by: Carles Bosch; David Trueba
- Release date: 2002
- Language: Spanish

Balseros (Spanish: Rafters) is a 2002 Catalan documentary co-directed by Carles Bosch and Josep Maria Domènech about Cubans leaving during the Período Especial.

As a consequence of the widespread poverty that came with the end of economic support from the former USSR, 37,191 Cubans left Cuba in 1994, unimpeded by the Cuban government, using anything they could find or build to get to Florida in the United States. Most left with improvised rafts, which were often not seaworthy, and some even hijacked a ferry.

The documentary consists largely of interviews with the rafters ("Balseros"), over the course of seven years the lives of seven of those refugees, from the building of their rafts to their attempts at building new lives in the United States, giving insight into daily life in Cuba and the US in those days.

The documentary is 2 hours long. The first half is filmed in Cuba, with in the end some scenes of the rafters' months long detention in Guantanamo Bay, where lotteries were used to decide who would be allowed to go to the US. All the while, their families didn't know their whereabouts. The last hour is about the lives of those who got to the USA. These people were filmed again five years later, showing their difficulties adapting to a new type of society and the resulting homesickness, a "human adventure of people who are shipwrecked between two worlds".

== Reception ==
=== Critical response ===
Balseros has an approval rating of 88% on review aggregator website Rotten Tomatoes, based on 24 reviews, and an average rating of 7.46/10. The website's critical consensus states, "Patient and persuasive in its approach, Balseros puts a human face on the struggle to survive in 21st century Cuba -- and the dangerous battle to find a better life elsewhere". Metacritic assigned the film a weighted average score of 73 out of 100, based on 14 critics, indicating "generally favorable reviews".

=== Awards ===
- Best Foreign Documentary and Memory Documentary Award at the Festival Internacional del Nuevo Cine Latinoamericano, Havana, 2002
- Best Documentary in Spanish Language at the Ajijic Festival Internacional de Cine, Mexico, 2002
- Winner of the IDA Awards (International Documentary Association), 2003
- Nominated for an Academy Award. 2004
- Winner of the Peabody Awards, 2004
- Winner of an Emmy Award for Cinematography by Josep Maria Domènech (Best Photography), 2005
- Nominated for Best Documentary, Goya awards. 2003

== Specs ==
- Produced by: Bausan Films & TVC
- Directors: Carles Bosch & Josep Mª Domènech
- Scripts: David Trueba & Carles Bosch
- Director de fotografía: Josep Mª Domènech
- Producer: Loris Omedes
- Executive Producer: Mª José Solera
- Executive Producer TVC: Tom Roca
- Director of Production: Tono Folguera
- Production Manager: Richard Schweid
- Music : Lucrecia
- Sound: Juan Sánchez "Cuti"
- Editing: Ernest Blasi
- Graphics: Philip Stanton
- Language: Spanish & English
- Budget: €770.000

== Sources ==
- https://web.archive.org/web/20051215100716/http://www.bausanfilms.com/largo_balseros.htm
- https://web.archive.org/web/20051223014857/http://www.zinema.com/pelicula/2002/balseros.htm
- https://web.archive.org/web/20100626052534/http://pragda.com/movie/balseros.php
