= Daniela Fejerman =

Argentine film director and writer (born 1964)

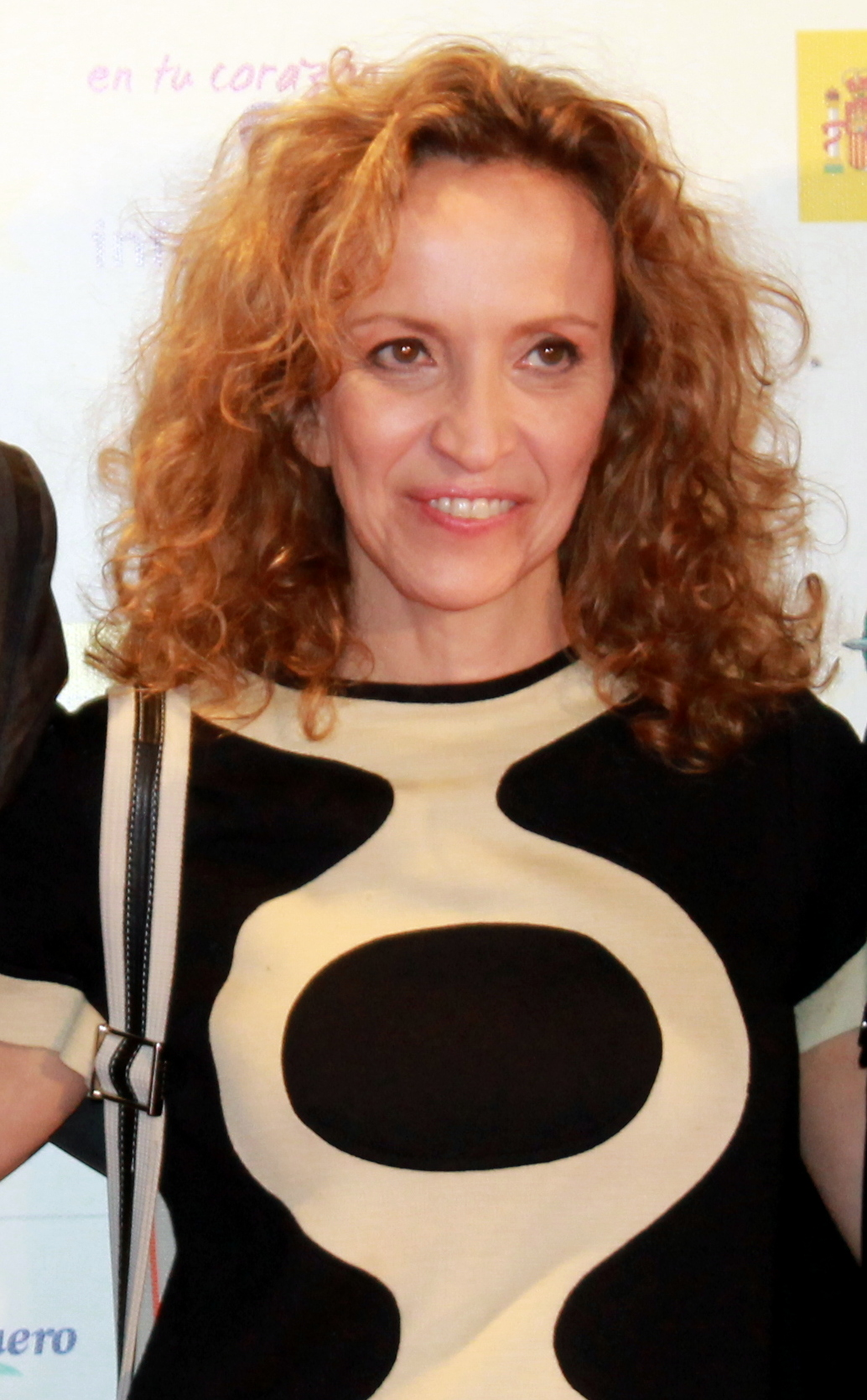
Daniela Fejerman at the 2012 Seminci.

Daniela Fejerman (born 1964) is an Argentine director and film writer and a licensed psychologist. Her brother is Argentine musician Andy Chango. Her sister is Laura Fejerman. She has worked together with Inés París for 13 years.

== Filmography ==
- A mí quien me manda meterme en esto, director and writer with Inés París. (1997)
- Vamos a dejarlo, director and writer with Inés París. (1999)
- Sé quién eres, writer (2000)
- A mi madre le gustan las mujeres, director and writer with Inés París. (2002)
- Semen, una historia de amor, director and writer with Inés París. (2005)
- 7 minutos, director and writer with Ángeles González-Sinde (2009)
- Alguien que cuide de mí, director and writer with Elvira Lindo (2023)

== Awards ==
- Nominated for a Goya for best new director with Inés París for A mi madre le gustan las mujeres.

== See also ==
- List of female film and television directors
- List of LGBT-related films directed by women
