= The Shanghai Spell =

- Theatrical release poster
- Spanish: El embrujo de Shanghai
- Directed by: Fernando Trueba
- Screenplay by: Fernando Trueba
- Based on: El embrujo de Shanghai by Juan Marsé
- Produced by: Andrés Vicente Gómez; Cristina Huete
- Starring: Fernando Fernán Gómez; Eduard Fernández; Aida Folch; Ariadna Gil; Antonio Resines; Jorge Sanz; Rosa María Sardá; Fernando Tielve
- Cinematography: José Luis López Linares
- Music by: Antoine Duhamel
- Production companies: Lolafilms; Shangai Spell Ltda; Pyramide Productions; Orsan Productions
- Release date: 12 April 2002 (Spain)
- Countries: Spain; France; United Kingdom
- Language: Spanish

The Shanghai Spell (Spanish: El embrujo de Shanghai) is a 2002 film written and directed by Fernando Trueba. The film is based on the 1993 novel of the same name by Juan Marsé. It is an international co-production among companies from Spain, France and the United Kingdom.

== Plot ==
The film is set in the Gràcia district of Barcelona, in the wake of the Spanish Civil War. Fourteen-year-old Dani is a budding painter, who looks after Captain Blay (Fernando Fernán Gómez), an ageing civil war veteran. Blay suggests Dani draw local girl Susana, who is suffering from tuberculosis, as the subject of a poster warning of the dangers of factory smoke causing consumption. Dani and Susana begin a tentative romance, as they hear stories of Susana's father's exploits as a secret agent in the Chinese city of Shanghai from one of his wartime colleagues.

== Cast ==
- Aida Folch as Susana
- Ariadna Gil as Anita
- Antonio Resines as El Kim (a Maquis)
- Fernando Tielve as Dani
- Eduard Fernández as Forcat
- Fernando Fernán Gómez as Capitán Blay
- Jorge Sanz as Denis
- Rosa María Sardá as Betibú
- Juanjo Ballesta as Finito Chacón

== Production ==
Based on the 1993 novel El embrujo de Shanghai by Juan Marsé, the screenplay was penned by the director Fernando Trueba. A joint co-production among companies from Spain, France and the United Kingdom, the film was produced by Lolafilms, Shangai Spell Ltda, Pyramide Productions, and Orsan Productions and it had the participation of Antena 3 Televisión, Telemadrid and Vía Digital.

== Awards ==
The Shanghai Spell was nominated in several categories at the 17th Goya Awards in February 2003. The film won the awards for Best Art Direction, Best Costume Design and Best Makeup and Hairstyles; and was nominated for Best Original Screenplay, Best Cinematography, and Best Production Supervision.

== See also ==
- List of Spanish films of 2002
