= Talk to Her =

2002 film by Pedro Almodóvar

- Theatrical release poster
- Directed by: Pedro Almodóvar
- Written by: Pedro Almodóvar
- Produced by: Agustín Almodóvar; Michel Ruben
- Starring: Javier Cámara; Darío Grandinetti; Leonor Watling; Geraldine Chaplin; Rosario Flores
- Cinematography: Javier Aguirresarobe
- Edited by: José Salcedo
- Music by: Alberto Iglesias
- Production company: El Deseo S.A.
- Distributed by: Warner Sogefilms
- Release date: 15 March 2002 (Spain)
- Running time: 112 minutes
- Country: Spain
- Language: Spanish
- Box office: $64.8 million

Talk To Her (Spanish: Hable con ella) is a 2002 Spanish psychological melodrama film, written and directed by Pedro Almodóvar. It stars Javier Cámara, Darío Grandinetti, Leonor Watling, Geraldine Chaplin, and Rosario Flores. The film follows two men who form an unlikely friendship, as they care for two women who are both in comas.

The closing-night presentation at the 2002 New York Film Festival, the film was a widespread critical and commercial success, with singled-out praise towards its direction, performances and especially its screenplay. It won the BAFTA for Best Film Not in the English Language, and the Golden Globe for Best Foreign Language Film, while Almodóvar won the Academy Award for Best Original Screenplay, marking one of the few times where a non-English-speaking film won this category. Talk To Her is generally regarded as one of the best films of the 2000s, one of the best films of the 21st century, as well as Almodóvar's magnum opus.

== Plot ==
The story unfolds in flashbacks, giving details of two relationships that become intertwined.

At a performance of Café Müller, a dance-theatre piece by Pina Bausch, Benigno Martín and Marco Zuluaga are seated next to each other. Benigno notices tears on Marco's face.

Marco is a journalist and travel writer who sees a TV interview with Lydia González, a famous matador. He thinks that an article about her would be interesting and contacts her. The news that she has broken up with her boyfriend "el Niño de Valencia", another matador, has been all over the tabloids. When Marco confesses that he is a journalist who knows nothing about bullfighting, she becomes angry and abruptly exits his car outside her house. He starts to drive off but stops when he hears a scream from inside her house. Lydia rushes out: Marco goes inside to kill a snake. They become friends and, later, lovers. One day, Lydia says that she has something important to say after the bullfight that afternoon, during which she is gored and becomes comatose. Marco remains by her side at the hospital and befriends Benigno, who recognizes him from the theatre. A doctor tells Marco that there is no reason to remain hopeful about Lydia.

Benigno is obsessed with Alicia Roncero, a beautiful dancer whom he watches practicing in the studio that he can see into from the apartment where he lives with his invalid mother. To care for her, he became a nurse and a beautician. After his mother dies, he finds the courage to talk to Alicia. When she enters her building, Benigno notices that it is also the office of Dr. Roncero, a psychiatrist. As a ruse to gain access to Alicia's apartment, Benigno makes an appointment to see the doctor, where he talks about the years he cared for his mother and says that he is lonely and a virgin. That night, Alicia is struck by a car and becomes comatose. In the hospital, where Benigno is assigned to care for her, he talks to her as if she were awake. He tells Marco that he should talk to Lydia because, even when in a coma, women understand men's problems. In response to Dr. Roncero's questioning, Benigno says that he is gay, presumably so that the doctor will not be suspicious of his intimate care of Alicia.

"El Niño de Valencia", whom Marco finds in Lydia's room one day, tells Marco that he and Lydia had reconciled, which she had planned to tell Marco before the goring incident. He also says that he should care for her now. Marco goes into Alicia's room and opens his heart to her. When Benigno appears, he tells Marco that he always thought Marco and Lydia would separate. A nurse expresses concern that Alicia has not had a period in two months and appears bloated. In the hospital parking lot, Benigno tells Marco of his desire to marry Alicia.

The hospital staff discover that Alicia is pregnant because she was raped. Further investigation reveals that her chart does not indicate her missed period. Benigno admits to falsifying the chart. Another orderly reports having overheard Benigno's conversation with Marco about wanting to marry Alicia.

Unaware of Alicia's pregnancy, Marco leaves for Jordan to write a travel book. Months later, he reads in a newspaper that Lydia died without awakening from her coma. When he calls the hospital to talk to Benigno, a nurse tells him that he is in prison for Alicia's rape. Benigno asks Marco to find out what has happened to her. Marco stays in Benigno's apartment, from which he sees Alicia in the dance studio doing rehab exercises with her teacher, Katrina, and he learns that Alicia had a stillborn baby.

Marco receives a voicemail from Benigno saying that he cannot live without Alicia. Marco rushes to the prison, where Benigno has left him a farewell letter: Marco visits his grave and tells him about the stillbirth and Alicia's recovery.

The film ends in the theatre where it began, with Alicia and Katrina sitting a few rows behind Marco at the dance performance. Marco is seen turning back to look at a smiling Alicia and, echoing a caption that had appeared for the couples "Marco y Lydia" and "Benigno y Alicia," the words “Marco y Alicia” appear on the screen.

== Cast ==
- Javier Cámara as Benigno Martín
- Darío Grandinetti as Marco Zuluaga
- Leonor Watling as Alicia Roncero
- Rosario Flores as Lydia González
- Mariola Fuentes as Rosa
- Geraldine Chaplin as Katerina Bilova
- Pina Bausch as herself dancing in Café Müller
- Malou Airaudo as "Café Müller" dancer
- Caetano Veloso as himself singing "Cucurrucucú paloma" at a party
- Roberto Álvarez as Doctor
- Elena Anaya as Ángela
- Lola Dueñas as Matilde
- Adolfo Fernández as Niño de Valencia
- Ana Fernández as Lydia's sister
- Chus Lampreave as Caretaker
- Paz Vega as Amparo (in silent film)
- Cecilia Roth as Party guest (cameo)
- Marisa Paredes as Party guest (cameo)

== Music ==
The music was composed by Alberto Iglesias.

A scene shows the Brazilian singer Caetano Veloso singing "Cucurrucucú paloma" (in Spanish) at a party.

== Reception ==
=== Box office ===
The film grossed $9,285,469 in the United States and $41,716,081 internationally for a worldwide total of $51,001,550.

=== Critical response ===
On Rotten Tomatoes the film has an approval rating of 91% based on reviews from 137 critics, and an average rating of 8.1/10. The website's consensus states: "Another masterful, compassionate work from Pedro Almodóvar". On Metacritic, the film has a weighted average score of 86 out of 100, based on reviews from 34 critics.

Roger Ebert of the Chicago Sun-Times gave it four out of four, and wrote: "Combines improbable melodrama (gored bullfighters, comatose ballerinas) with subtly kinky bedside vigils and sensational denouements, and yet at the end, we are undeniably touched." A. O. Scott of The New York Times named Talk to Her "The best film of the year".

Some critics have criticized Talk to Her for its handling of sexual violence. They point out that the film does not depict the assault directly, but instead frames it through aesthetic means that can distance the audience from the brutality of the act. Critics also argue that the story focuses predominantly on male perspectives and hardly deals with the consequences of the attack for the female characters.

=== Accolades ===
Talk to Her was not submitted as Spain's pick for the Academy Award for Best Foreign Language Film. Mondays in the Sun was selected instead.

Wins

- 2002 Academy Awards:
  - Best Original Screenplay - Pedro Almodóvar
- Argentine Film Critics Association ("Silver Condor"): Best Foreign Film
- 2003 BAFTA Awards:
  - Best Film Not in the English Language
  - Best Original Screenplay - Pedro Almodóvar
- 2003 Bangkok International Film Festival ("Golden Kinnaree Award"): Best Film, Best Director - Pedro Almodóvar
- Bodil Awards: Best Non-American Film
- Bogey Awards: Bogey Award
- Cinema Brazil Grand Prize: Best Foreign Language Film
- Cinema Writers Circle Awards (Spain): Best Original Score - Alberto Iglesias
- Czech Lions: Best Foreign Language Film
- 2003 César Awards: Best European Union Film
- European Film Awards: Best Film, Best Director (Pedro Almodóvar), Best Screenwriter - Pedro Almodóvar
- French Syndicate of Cinema Critics: Best Foreign Film
- 2003 Golden Globe Awards:
  - Best Foreign Language Film
- Goya Awards (Spain): Best Original Score - Alberto Iglesias
- Los Angeles Film Critics Association: Best Director - Pedro Almodóvar
- Mexican Cinema Journalists ("Silver Goddess"): Best Foreign Film
- National Board of Review: Best Foreign Language Film
- Russian Guild of Film Critics ("Golden Aries"): Best Foreign Film
- Satellite Awards: Best Motion Picture: Foreign Language, Best Original Screenplay - Pedro Almodóvar
- Sofia International Film Festival: Audience Award – Best Film
- Spanish Actors Union: Performance in a Minor Role: Female - Mariola Fuentes
- Time magazine: Best Film
- Uruguayan Film Critics Association: Best Film (tie)
- Vancouver Film Critics Circle: Best Foreign Film

Nominations

- 2002 Academy Awards:
  - Best Director - Pedro Almodóvar
- British Independent Film Awards: Best Foreign Film – Foreign Language
- Broadcast Film Critics Association Awards: Best Foreign Language Film
- Chicago Film Critics Association: Best Foreign Language Film
- David di Donatello Awards: Best Foreign Film
- European Film Awards: Best Actor (Javier Cámara), Best Cinematographer - Javier Aguirresarobe
- Satellite Awards: Best Director - Pedro Almodóvar

=== Legacy ===
In 2005, Time magazine film critics Richard Corliss and Richard Schickel included Talk to Her in their list of the Time's All-Time 100 Movies. Paul Schrader placed the film at #46 on his canon of the 60 greatest films. Sight and Sound magazine included the film in its list of "30 great films of the 2000s". In a 2016 BBC poll, critics voted the film the 28th greatest since 2000. In 2025, it was one of the films voted for the "Readers' Choice" edition of The New York Times' list of "The 100 Best Movies of the 21st Century," finishing at number 260.
