= Malena Is a Name from a Tango =

- Theatrical release poster
- Spanish: Malena es un nombre de tango
- Directed by: Gerardo Herrero
- Screenplay by: Senel Paz
- Based on: Malena es un nombre de tango by Almudena Grandes
- Produced by: Gerardo Herrero; Javier López Blanco
- Starring: Ariadna Gil; Marta Belaustegui; Luis Fernando Alves; Carlos López; Isabel Otero; Dafne Fernández; Rebeca Fernández; Alicia Hermida; Alicia Agut; Marina Saura; Roman Luknár; Miguel Palenzuela; Jesús Ruyman
- Cinematography: Alfredo Mayo
- Edited by: Carmen Frías
- Music by: Antoine Duhamel
- Production companies: Tornasol Films; Alta Films; Blue Dahlia Production; La Sept Cinema; Road Movies Dritte Produktionen
- Distributed by: Alta Films
- Release date: 12 April 1996 (Spain)
- Countries: Spain; France; Germany
- Language: Spanish
- Box office: 188 million ₧ (Spain)

Malena Is a Name from a Tango (Spanish: Malena es un nombre de tango) is a 1996 drama film directed by Gerardo Herrero from a screenplay by Senel Paz based on the novel by Almudena Grandes. It stars Ariadna Gil.

== Plot ==
The plot concerns about the romantic and sexual endeavours of Malena, a victimised and rebellious woman contrasting to her twin sister Reina (who always was the model girl in the family), and then about the mother-son relationship of Malena with her son. Malena was gifted however a talisman by her grandfather back when she was 10.

== Cast ==
- Ariadna Gil as Malena
- Marta Belaustegui as Reina
- Carlos López as Fernando
- Luis Fernando Alvés as Santiago
- Isabel Otero as Magda
- Dafne Fernández as Malena niña
- Rebeca Fernández
- Alicia Hermida as Paulina
- Alicia Agut
- Marina Saura
- Roman Luknár
- Miguel Palenzuela as abuelo
- Jesús Ruyman
- Susi Sánchez
- Juan Carlos Vellido
- Consuelo Trujillo
- Mariví Bilbao

== Production ==
An adaptation of the novel by Almudena Grandes, the screenplay was penned by Senel Paz. It is a Spanish-French-German co-production by Alta Films, Tornasol Films, Blue Dahlia Production, La Sept Cinema, and Road Movies Produktionen. Shooting locations included the San Julián estate (La Hoya, Lorca), Mula, Águilas, and Madrid.

== Release ==
Distributed by Alta Films, the film was theatrically released in Spain on 12 April 1996.

The film was the fifth highest grossing Spanish film of the year with a gross of 188 million Spanish Pesetas ($1.31 million).

== Reception ==
Jonathan Holland of Variety deemed the film to be a "well-intentioned, provocatively moralizing women's pic that ends up as second-rate melodrama".

Luis Martínez of El País deemed that, efforts from a "magnetic" Ariadna Gil notwithstanding, the films "ends up as an uneven and quite chatty journey into the interiors of this disease called life".

== See also ==
- List of Spanish films of 1996
