= Gerardo Herrero =

Spanish film director, screenwriter and producer

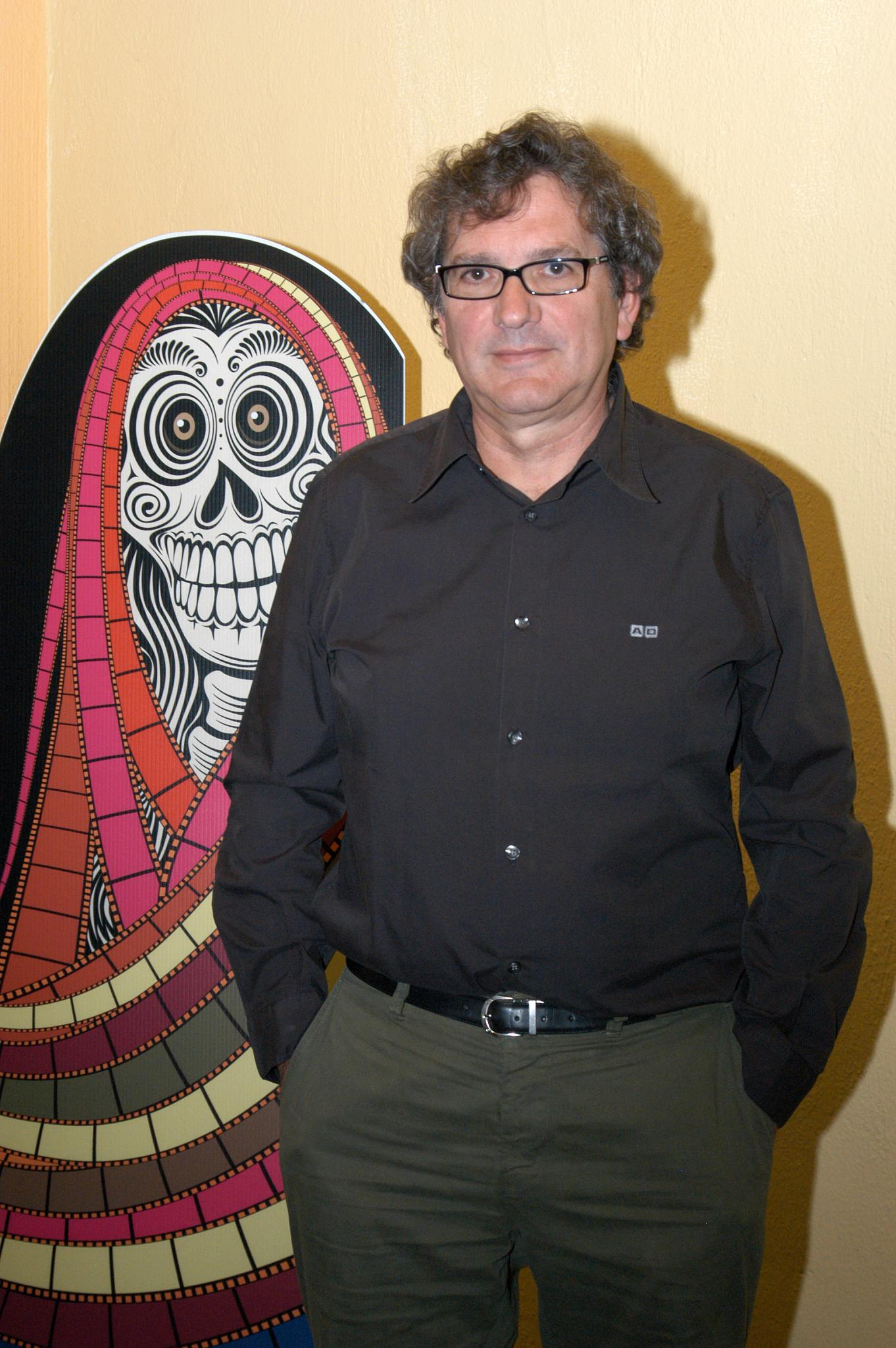
- Herrero in 2008
- Born: Gerardo Herrero Pérez-Gamir; 28 January 1953 (age 73); Madrid, Spain
- Occupations: Film producer; film director; screenwriter
- Years active: 1988–present

Gerardo Herrero Pérez-Gamir (born 28 January 1953) is a Spanish film director, screenwriter and producer. He is a prolific promoter of international coproductions and collaborations between Spain and Hispanic American countries.

From 1993 to 1994, he chaired the Academy of Cinematographic Arts and Sciences of Spain.

His 1997 film Comanche Territory was entered into the 47th Berlin International Film Festival.

Herrero founded the Tornasol Films together with Javier López Blanco in 1987. He has often co-produced in tandem with Uruguayan producer Mariela Besuievsky, with whom he has also shared a domestic partnership.

== Filmography as film director ==
- 1994: Desvío al paraíso
- 1995: Malena es un nombre de tango (Malena Is a Name from a Tango)
- 1997: Territorio Comanche (Comanche Territory)
- 1998: Frontera Sur
- 1999: América mía
- 2000: Las razones de mis amigos
- 2001: El lugar donde estuvo el paraiso
- 2003: El misterio Galíndez (The Galíndez File)
- 2004: El principio de Arquímedes (The Archimedes Principle)
- 2004: Ni locas, ni terroristas
- 2005: Heroína (Heroine)
- 2006: Los aires difíciles (Rough Winds)
- 2007: Una mujer invisible
- 2008: Que parezca un accidente
- 2009: Night Runner
- 2011: Silencio en la nieve (Frozen Silence)
- 2013: Lejos del mundo
- 2013: Crimen con vista al mar
- 2015: La playa de los ahogados
- 2019: El asesino de los caprichos (The Goya Murders)
- 2023: Bajo terapia (Under Therapy)
- 2024: Raqa (Raqqa: Spy vs. Spy)
- 2026: Carta blanca (Carte Blanche)

== Filmography as film producer ==
- 1988: La boca del lobo. by Francisco J. Lombardi
- 1990: Caídos del cielo. by Francisco J. Lombardi
- 1992: Un paraguas para tres. by Felipe Vega
- 1993: Le journal de Lady M. by Alain Tanner
- 1994: Desvío al paraíso. by Gerardo Herrero
- 1995: Guantanamera. by Tomás Gutiérrez Alea
- 1995: Malena es un nombre de tango. by Gerardo Herrero
- 1996: Éxtasis. by Mariano Barroso
- 1996: Bajo la piel. by Francisco J. Lombardi
- 1997: Cosas que dejé en La Habana. by Manuel Gutiérrez Aragón
- 1997: Martín (Hache). by Adolfo Aristarain
- 1997: Mensaka. by Salvador García Ruiz
- 1998: El Pianista. by Mario Gas
- 1999: El corazón del guerrero. by Daniel Monzón
- 2000: Nueces para el amor. by Alberto Lecchi
- 2000: El otro barrio. by Salvador García Ruiz
- 2000: Lista de Espera. by Juan Carlos Tabío
- 2000: Las razones de mis amigos. by Gerardo Herrero
- 2000: Sé quién eres. by Patricia Ferreira
- 2000: Krámpack. by Cesc Gay
- 2000: Tinta roja. by Francisco J. Lombardi
- 2000: Kasbah. by Mariano Barroso
- 2000: Le harem de Mme Osmane by De Nadir Moknèche.
- 2001: El hijo de la novia. by Juan José Campanella
- 2001: Sin vergüenza. by Joaquín Oristrell
- 2001: Hombres felices. by Roberto Santiago
- 2001: L'amore imperfetto. by Giovanni Davide Maderna
- 2002: Lugares comunes. by Adolfo Aristarain
- 2002: El último tren. Corazón de fuego. by Diego Arsuaga
- 2002: Rosa la china. by Valeria Sarmiento
- 2002: Aunque estés lejos. by Juan Carlos Tabio
- 2003: La vida mancha. by Enrique Urbizu
- 2003: El misterio Galíndez/The Galindez File. by Gerardo Herrero
- 2003: En la ciudad. by Cesc Gay
- 2004: Luna de Avellaneda. by Juan José Campanella
- 2004: La vida que te espera. by Manuel Gutiérrez Aragón
- 2004: Nubes de verano. by Felipe Vega
- 2004: Machuca. by Andrés Wood
- 2004: Seres queridos. by Dominic Harari
- 2004: Inconscientes. by Joaquín Oristrell
- 2004: Perder es cuestión de método. by Sergio Cabrera
- 2005: El penalti más largo del mundo. by Roberto Santiago
- 2005: Hormigas en la boca. by Mariano Barroso
- 2005: Heroína. by Gerardo Herrero
- 2005: Los aires difíciles. by Gerardo Herrero
- 2006: Mujeres en el parque by Felipe Vega
- 2009: Castillos de papel. by Salvador García Ruiz
- 2009: El secreto de sus ojos. by Juan José Campanella
- 2012: Todos tenemos un plan by Ana Piterbarg
- 2012: ¡Atraco! by Eduard Cortés
- 2016: Que Dios nos perdone by Rodrigo Sorogoyen
- 2018: The Man Who Killed Don Quixote. by Terry Gilliam
- 2021: El sustituto by Oscar Aibar
