= Ants in the Mouth =

- Theatrical release poster
- Spanish: Hormigas en la boca
- Directed by: Mariano Barroso
- Screenplay by: Mariano Barroso; Alejandro Hernández; Tom Abrams
- Based on: Amanecer con hormigas en la boca by Miguel Barroso
- Produced by: Eduardo Campoy; Gerardo Herrero; José Manuel Lorenzo
- Starring: Eduard Fernández; Ariadna Gil; Jorge Perugorría; José Luis Gómez
- Cinematography: Javier Aguirresarobe
- Edited by: Luisma del Valle
- Music by: Xavier Capellas
- Production companies: Drive Cine; Messidor Films; ICAIC
- Distributed by: Filmax (es)
- Release dates: 22 April 2005 (Málaga); 29 April 2005 (Spain)
- Countries: Spain; Cuba
- Language: Spanish

Ants in the Mouth (Spanish: Hormigas en la boca) is a 2005 Spanish-Cuban thriller film directed by Mariano Barroso, who has also co-written the screenplay along with Alejandro Hernández and Tom Abrams, adapting the novel Amanecer con hormigas en la boca by Miguel Barroso. It stars Eduard Fernández, Ariadna Gil, Jorge Perugorría and José Luis Gómez.

== Plot ==
The fiction is set in the late 1950s. Released from jail after spending 8 years in a Francoist prison, Martín moves to pre-revolutionary Havana, Cuba, looking for his girlfriend Julia, and once there, he is told by Julia's uncle Dalmau that she is dead. He eventually finds out that she had married Freddy Navarro, a corrupt senator of the Batista regime.

== Cast ==
- Eduard Fernández as Martín
- Ariadna Gil as Julia
- Jorge Perugorría as Freddy Navarro
- José Luis Gómez as Dalmau
- Samuel Claxton as Despanier

== Production ==
Penned by Mariano Barroso and Alejandro Hernández with the collaboration of Tom Abrams, the screenplay is an adaptation of the novel Amanecer con hormigas en la boca by Miguel Barroso, Mariano Barroso's elder brother. A Spanish-Cuban co-production, the film was produced by Drive Cine, Messidor Films and ICAIC with participation of TVE and Canal+. Eduardo Campoy, Gerardo Herrero, and José Manuel Lorenzo were credited as producers. Boasting a budget of around €4 million, the film was shot in 2004 in locations of Cuba (including Havana) and Spain.

== Release ==
Ants in the Mouth premiered as the opening film of the 8th Málaga Film Festival in April 2005. Distributed by Filmax, the film was theatrically released in Spain on 29 April 2005.

== Reception ==
Jonathan Holland of Variety deemed the film to be "a brooding, intense and shrewdly-plotted thriller set in 1950s Havana", featuring a "beautifully modulated" lead performance by Fernández, although, conversely, the reviewer assessed that Gil fails to turn "her femme fatale beauty into anything deeper".

== Accolades ==
Year	Award	Category	Nominee(s)	Result	Ref.
2005	8th Málaga Film Festival	Special Jury Prize		Won	
2005	8th Málaga Film Festival	Silver Biznaga for Best Actor	Eduard Fernández	Won	
2006	CEC Medals	Best Adapted Screenplay	Mariano Barroso, Antonio Hernández, Tom Abrams	Nominated	
2006	20th Goya Awards	Best Costume Design	Sonia Grande	Nominated	

== See also ==
- List of Spanish films of 2005
