= Libertad (TV series) =

Spanish historical drama limited television series

- Genre: Historical drama; Western
- Screenplay by: Miguel Barros; Michel Gaztambide
- Directed by: Enrique Urbizu
- Starring: Bebe; Isak Férriz; Xabier Deive; Jorge Suquet; Sofía Oria; Jason Fernández
- Composer: Mario de Benito
- Country of origin: Spain
- Original language: Spanish
- No. of seasons: 1
- No. of episodes: 5

Production
- Running time: 50 min
- Production companies: Movistar+; LaZona

Original release
- Network: Movistar+
- Release: 26 March 2021

Libertad (lit. 'Freedom') is a Spanish historical drama limited television series set in 19th-century Spain featuring both Western and survival thriller elements, produced by Movistar+ and LaZona, directed by Enrique Urbizu and starring Bebe, Isak Férriz, Xabier Deive, Jorge Suquet, Sofía Oria and Jason Fernández. It was released on 26 March 2021, both the five-part series and a theatrical feature film cut.

== Premise ==
Set in 1807 Spain, the fiction tracks the struggle of a woman, La Llanera (Bebe), in her search for freedom. After serving a 17-year prison sentence, La Llanera is pardoned and leaves with her son Juan (Jason Fernández), born in prison, son of Lagartijo (Xabier Deive), but they are chased by parties of bandits and hit men on behalf of the Governor (Luis Callejo).

== Cast ==
- Bebe as Lucía, La Llanera.
- Isak Férriz as Aceituno.
- Xabier Deive as Lagartijo.
- Jorge Suquet as John.
- Sofía Oria as Reina.
- Jason Fernández as Juan.
- Manolo Caro.
- Ginés García Millán as Pedro de Urquijo.
- José Sospedra.
- Antonio Velázquez as Saldaña.
- Óscar Higares.

With the special collaboration of

- Pedro Casablanc as Don Anastasio.
- Luis Callejo as El Gobernador.

== Production and release ==
Produced by LaZona and Movistar+, the series is directed by Enrique Urbizu, whereas the screenplay is authored by Michel Gaztambide and Miguel Barros, who had already worked with Urbizu in Gigantes. The original score was composed by Mario de Benito. The series mostly features outdoor locations. The series was shot in different locations in the Madrid region, and the provinces of Segovia, Cuenca and Guadalajara, including the surroundings of the Monastery of San Bartolomé in Lupiana. Filming ended in March 2020, a week before the country-wide lockdown enforced in Spain because of the COVID-19 pandemic. The series consists of 5 episodes with a running time of around 50 minutes. On 18 February 2021 Enrique Urbizu and Movistar+ presented the series, announcing the slated release date of the full series for 26 March 2021. They also announced an alternative 135-minute-long film format would simultaneously become available in cinemas, distributed by A Contracorriente Films. Beta Film secured the international distribution rights of the series.

Series	Episodes	Originally released	Network	Ref.
1	5	26 March 2021	Movistar+	

No. in season	Title	Directed by	Original release date
1	"Lucía, 'La Llanera'"	Enrique Urbizu	26 March 2021
2	"Ruiz, 'El Lagartijo'"	Enrique Urbizu	26 March 2021
3	"El hombre del río"	Enrique Urbizu	26 March 2021
4	"La frontera"	Enrique Urbizu	26 March 2021
5	"Libertad"	Enrique Urbizu	26 March 2021
