= Mario de Benito =

Spanish composer

Mario de Benito (born 25 September 1958) is a Spanish composer.

== Biography ==
Mario de Benito was born on 25 September 1958 in Taravilla, province of Guadalajara, receiving a musical education at Madrid's Higher Conservatory of Music and, later, under Horacio Icasto. After a spell as a member of synth-pop act 'Trópico de Cáncer', he was charged with scoring the 1990 film Alone Together, thereby starting a prolific career as composer in film and television series.

A recurring collaborator of director Enrique Urbizu, de Benito earned a nomination to the Goya Award for Best Original Score for his work in No Rest for the Wicked. Jointly with Richelieu Morris, he had previously scooped another nomination to the Goya Award for Best Original Song for The Witch Affair's "Just Sorcery".

== Scored films ==
- Alone Together (1990)
- La reina anónima (1992)
- Tell Laura I Love Her (1995)
- Brujas (1996)
- Un asunto privado (1996)
- Geisha (1996)
- Blinded (1997)
- To the Limit (1997)
- Mambí (1998)
- Un buen novio (1998)
- Spanish Fly (1998)
- El invierno de las anjanas (2000)
- Lady of Porto Pim (2001)
- Chicken Skin (2001)
- El deseo de ser piel roja (2002)
- Bestiary (2002)
- Box 507 (2002)
- The Witch Affair (2003)
- Diario de una becaria (2003)
- Life Marks (2003)
- Stork Day (2006)
- Crossing the Border (2005)
- No digas nada (2007)
- Love Expresso (2008)
- Cyrano Fernández (2008)
- Ispansi (¡Españoles!) (2011)
- No Rest for the Wicked (2011)
- Dioses y perros (2014)
- 2 Francos, 40 pesetas (2014)
- Los comensales (2016)
