= Four Seasons in Havana =

2016 Spanish-language TV show on Netflix

- Genre: Crime; Drama; Thriller
- Based on: The Havana Quartet by Leonardo Padura Fuentes
- Starring: Jorge Perugorría; Carlos Enrique Almirante; Luis Alberto García
- Countries of origin: Spain; Cuba
- Original language: Spanish
- No. of episodes: 4

Production
- Production companies: Mistery Producciones; Movistar+; Nadcon Film

Four Seasons in Havana (Spanish: Cuatro estaciones en La Habana) was a four-part 2016 Spanish-language web television series on Netflix. It is based on the books “The Havana Quartet” written by Cuban novelist Leonardo Padura Fuentes. The premise revolves around lieutenant Mario Conde (Jorge Perugorría) and his partner Sgt. Manolo Palacios (Carlos Enrique Almirante), as they solve crime in the heart of Cuba’s capital Havana.

In November 2020, it was announced that the series will be leaving the streaming service on December 9 due to their expired 4-year contract with the show's production companies.

== Cast ==
- Jorge Perugorría as Mario Conde
- Carlos Enrique Almirante as Palacios
- Luis Alberto García as Carlos El Flaco
- Mario Guerra as Candito El Rojo
- Enrique Molina as Antonio Rangel
- Jorge Martínez as Andrés
- Alexis Díaz as Conejoj
- Vladimir Cruz as Fabricio
- Néstor Jiménez as Forense
- Ernesto del Cañal as Crespo
- Saul Rojas as Greco
- Yudith Castillo as Vilma
- Laura Ramos as Tamara
- Aurora Basnuevo as Josefina
- Hector Pérez as Miki Cara de Jeba
- Yessica Borroto as Cuqui
- Felix Beatón as Capt. Cicerón
- Pilar Mayo as Maruchi
- Ylsi Pérez as Secretaria de Rangel
