= Michel Gaztambide =

French-born screenwriter (born 1959)

Michel Gaztambide (born 1959) is a France-born screenwriter based in the Basque Country, Spain. He is a recurring collaborator of Enrique Urbizu.

== Biography ==
Born in 1959 in Apt, Vaucluse, France, he was raised in Pamplona, Navarre, Spain. He later relocated to San Sebastián. Early writing credits include Santa Cruz, el cura guerrillero and Chatarra. His work in Julio Medem's 1992 film Vacas earned him a nomination to the Goya Award for Best Original Screenplay.

After a period working in television for ETB, he returned to cinema in 2002 with the writing credits of Box 507, marking the beginning of a recurring partnership with Basque filmmaker Enrique Urbizu. The collaboration included films such as Life Marks (2003), and No Rest for the Wicked (2011; for which he won the Goya Award for Best Original Screenplay) as well as television series such as Gigantes and Libertad.

He has also worked in Un poco de chocolate (2008), El idioma imposible (2010), Baztan (2012), Petra (2018, for which he was nominated to the Feroz Award for Best Screenplay), The Influence (2019), and The Vault (2021).

In 2022, he was disclosed as a co-writer of Víctor Erice's project Cerrar los ojos.
