= Maria Grazia Cucinotta =

Italian actress (born 1968)

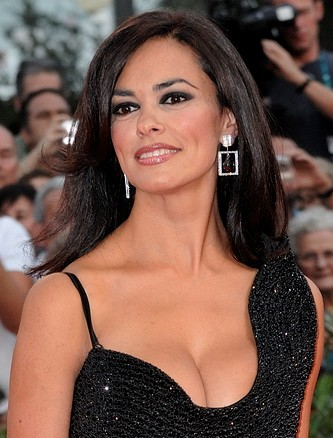
- Cucinotta at the 2009 Venice Film Festival
- Born: 27 July 1968 (age 58); Messina, Italy
- Occupation: Actress
- Years active: 1990–present
- Height: 1.77 m (5 ft 10 in)
- Spouse: Giulio Violati (m. 1995)

Maria Grazia Cucinotta (Italian: [maˈriːa ˈɡrattsja kutʃiˈnɔtta]; born 27 July 1968) is an Italian actress who has featured in films and television series since 1990. Internationally she is best known for her roles in Il Postino (The Postman) and The World Is Not Enough.

== Early life ==
Cucinotta was born 27 July 1968 in Messina in Sicily, Italy. In a May 2019 interview with Il Giornale, she related how she was taunted as a young girl for the size of her breasts, and that at age 19, she nearly underwent breast reduction surgery, saying, "My mother saved me at 19 when I was about to make the biggest mistake of my life. I wanted to have a breast reduction. For me, it was too bulky. Like all the women in my family, I have a size 6. I considered it a nightmare, especially as a young girl when I felt the eyes on me and the jokes of adults. They told me my breasts weren't suitable for modelling. But I cancelled the operation. My mother said she'd failed as a parent if I'd had that operation. Luckily, Renzo Arbore later called me to work as a showgirl, and my life changed."

== Career ==
After playing a few bit parts on television, her first movie role was in Michael Radford's critically acclaimed Il Postino (1994). Cucinotta played Beatrice Russo, the female love interest opposite Massimo Troisi. Despite the film being Cucinotta's first major role, Troisi had no doubt about her abilities, as Cucinotta later recalled:

He was a director and an actor who had the patience to teach me everything because I arrived at that audition recommended by a woman, Nathalie Caldonazzo, who was Massimo's girlfriend. That film changed my life. I'm happy that people still talk about him and that film with which he brought Italianness around the world.

National Review critic John Simon effusively praised Cucinotta's performance, describing it as "a cross between ancient Mediterranean love-goddess-hood and un-self-consciously sultry girlishness."

Cucinotta took part in the James Bond film The World is Not Enough (1999), playing a villain named "Cigar Girl". That same year, she also guest starred in The Sopranos episode "Isabella" as the titular character.

In 2005 Cucinotta appeared on The Simpsons episode "The Italian Bob", voicing Sideshow Bob's wife, Francesca. She also produced and acted in All the Invisible Children (2005), an anthology film serving as a charity fundraiser for UNICEF. Cucinotta appeared in the segment titled "Ciro", directed by co-producer Stefano Veneruso.

Cucinotta won the America Award of the Italy-USA Foundation in 2010. In 2012, Cucinotta received a star on the Italian Walk of Fame in Toronto, Ontario, Canada.

== Personal life ==
Maria Grazia Cucinotta is a Roman Catholic and devoted to Saint Anthony of Padua.

== Filmography ==
=== Films ===
| Year | Title | Role(s) | Notes |
|---|---|---|---|
| 1990 | Vacanze di Natale '90 | Arabella | |
| 1993 | Abbronzatissimi 2 – Un anno dopo | Hotel waitress | Cameo appearance |
| 1993 | Cominciò tutto per caso | The Possession | |
| 1993 | Alto rischio | Olga | |
| 1994 | Il Postino: The Postman | Beatrice Russo | |
| 1995 | The Day of the Beast | Susanna | |
| 1995 | The Graduates | Letizia | |
| 1996 | The Mayor | Rita "Rituccia" | |
| 1996 | Italiani | Maria | |
| 1997 | Il decisionista | The journalist | |
| 1997 | Camere da letto | Maddalena | |
| 1997 | A Brooklyn State of Mind | Gabriela | |
| 1998 | The Second Wife | Anna | |
| 1999 | Ballad of the Nightingale | Aina | |
| 1999 | The World Is Not Enough | "Cigar Girl" (Giulietta Da Vinci) | |
| 2000 | Picking Up the Pieces | Desi | |
| 2000 | Just One Night | Aurora | |
| 2001 | Stregati dalla luna | Miria | |
| 2004 | Our Italian Husband | Maria Scocozza | |
| 2004 | Vanilla and Chocolate | Penelope | |
| 2005 | Miracle in Palermo! | Sara | |
| 2005 | Felix: Ein Hase auf Weltreise | Mother (voice) | Italian voice-over |
| 2005 | All the Invisible Children | Waitress | Segment: "Ciro"; also producer |
| 2006 | Uranya | Uranya | |
| 2007 | Sweet Sweet Marja | Catia | |
| 2007 | Last Minute Marocco | Valeria | Also producer |
| 2007 | Felix 2 – Der Hase und die verflixte Zeitmaschine | Mother (voice) | Italian voice-over |
| 2008 | Io non ci casco | Dr. Rosa | Also producer |
| 2009 | Purple Sea | Agnese | Also producer |
| 2009 | The Trick in the Sheet | Marianna | Also producer |
| 2009 | Death of the Virgin | Claudia | |
| 2009 | Fly Light | Caterina | |
| 2010 | La bella società | Maria | |
| 2010 | The Museum of Wonders | Memè | |
| 2011 | Un giorno della vita | Amelia | |
| 2011 | The Rite | Aunt Andria | |
| 2011 | Transgression | Elena | |
| 2011 | The Opening | Maria | |
| 2012 | La tana del bianconiglio | Nadia | Short film |
| 2012 | Teresa Manganiello: Sui passi dell'amore | Fabrizia Gregorini | |
| 2012 | La moglie del sarto | Rosetta | |
| 2012 | Un Amor de Película | Laura | |
| 2013 | Tulpa | None | Producer only |
| 2013 | Epic | Queen Tara (voice) | Italian voice-over |
| 2014 | Cam girl | Agency director | |
| 2014 | Maldamore | Vittoria | Also producer |
| 2015 | Nomi e cognomi | Anna Riva | |
| 2015 | Magic Card | Maria Grazia | |
| 2015 | Asino viola | Angiulina (voice) | Italian voice-over |
| 2015 | Babbo Natale non viene da nord | Psychologist | Also producer |
| 2016 | Oggi a te... domani a me | Donatella | |
| 2017 | Into the Rainbow | Dr. Julia Bianchi | |
| 2017 | La verità | Gabriele's mother | |
| 2018 | Shadow of the Wolf | Eleonora | |
| 2019 | Tutto liscio | Anna | |
| 2019 | Forse è solo mar di mare | Claudia | |
| 2019 | Il gatto e la luna | Sonya | |
| 2021 | American Night | Donna Maria | |
| 2021 | Gli anni belli | Adele | |
| 2023 | Wonderwell | Anna's mother | |
| 2023 | Il meglio di te | Nicole | |
| 2025 | Make a Wish | Elena | |

=== Television ===
| Year | Title | Role(s) | Notes |
|---|---|---|---|
| 1987 | Miss Italia 1987 | Herself / Contestant | Annual beauty contest |
| 1987–1988 | Indietro tutta! | Herself / co-host | Variety show |
| 1988–1989 | Cocco | Herself / Various | Sketch comedy |
| 1991 | Andy e Norman | Sophie | Main role |
| 1992 | Il TG delle vacanze | Herself / co-host | Variety show |
| 1996 | La signora della città | Rosa Minniti | Miniseries |
| 1996 | Padre papà | Luisa Iorio | Miniseries |
| 1997 | Solomon | Abishag | Television movie |
| 1998 | Vota la voce | Herself / co-host | Annual music festival |
| 1998 | Il quarto re | Izhira | Television movie |
| 1998 | Wildside | Lawyer | Episode: "Episode 37" |
| 1999 | The Sopranos | Isabella | Episode: "Isabella" |
| 2000 | Maria Maddalena | Mary Magdalene | Television movie |
| 2002 | Il bello delle donne | Rosy Fumo | Main role (season 2) |
| 2003 | Inferno Below | Santina | Miniseries |
| 2005 | The Simpsons | Francesca (voice) | Episode: "The Italian Bob" |
| 2007 | Imperium: Pompeii | Lavinia | Miniseries |
| 2008 | VIP | Nancy / Nicoletta | Television movie |
| 2009 | Così fan tutte | Maria Grazia | Episode: "Five" |
| 2012 | Punto su di te! | Herself / Contestant | Episode: "Episode 1" |
| 2017 | Celebrity MasterChef Italia | Herself / Contestant | Cooking show (season 1) |
| 2018 | Miss Italia 2018 | Herself / Judge | Annual beauty contest |
| 2021–present | L'ingrediente perfetto | Herself / Host | Cooking program |

== Television appearances ==
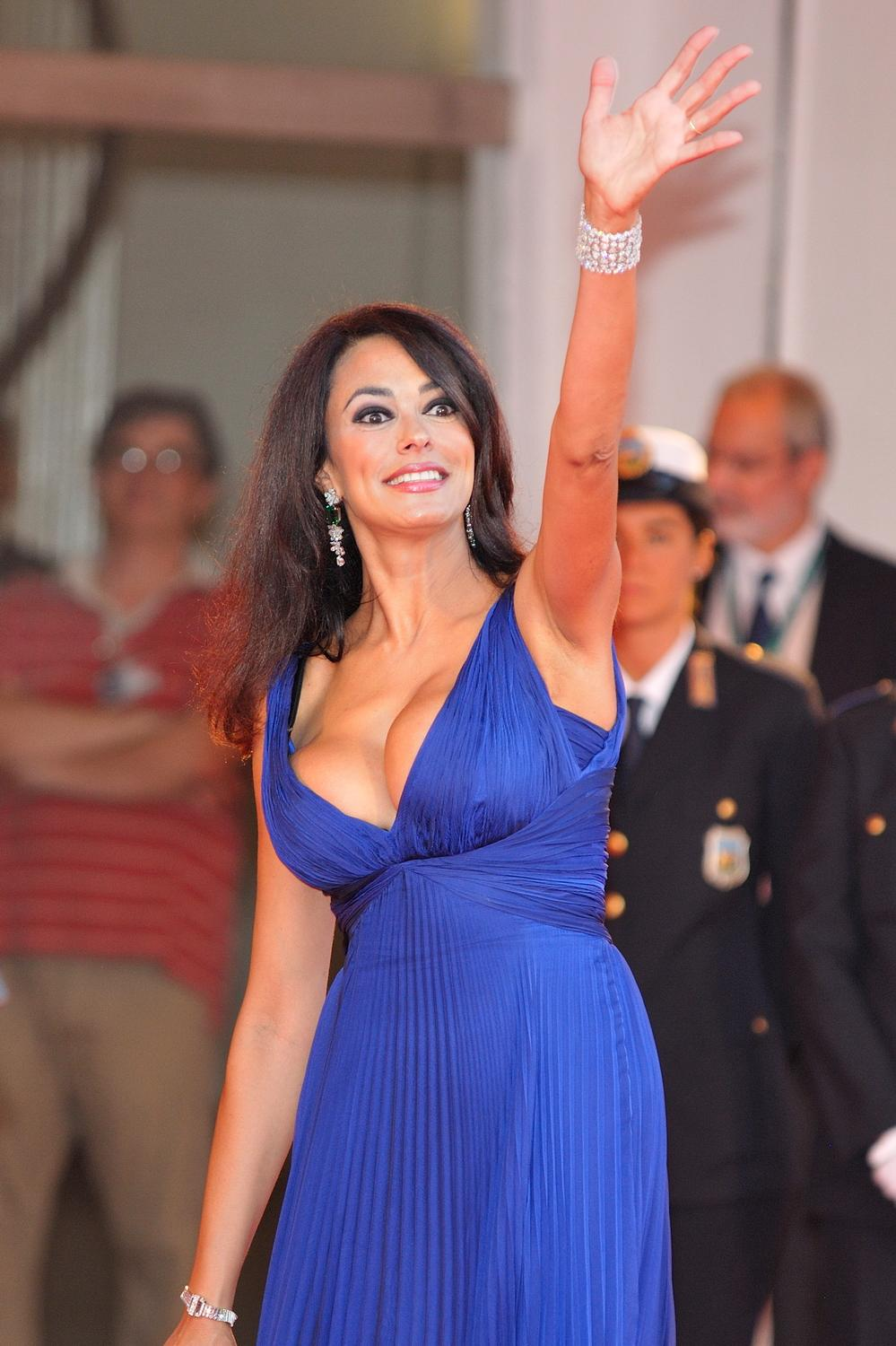
Cucinotta at the 66th Venice International Film Festival (Sep 2009)

- La Ragnatela (1991, TV Mini-Series)
- Andy e Norman (1991)
- Scherzi a parte (1992)
- Alta società (1992, TV Mini-Series)
- Padre papà (1996, TV Movie) – Luisa
- La Signora della città (1996, TV Movie) – Rosa Minniti
- L' Avvocato Porta (1997, TV Series) – Lucia (1999)
- Solomon (1997, TV Mini-Series) – Abishag
- Il Quarto re (1997, TV Movie) – Izhira
- Wildside – Lawyer episode (1998) – Lawyer
- In punta di cuore (1999, TV Movie) – Lucia
- The Sopranos (1999, Episode: "Isabella") – Isabella
- Mary Magdalene (2000) – Mary Magdalene
- Il Bello delle donne (2002, TV Series) – Rosy Fumo
- Inferno Below (2003, TV Movie) – Santina
- The Simpsons (2005, Episode: "The Italian Bob") – Francesca (voice)
- Pompei (2007, TV Mini-Series) – Lavinia
- VIP (2008, TV Movie) – Nancy Scalera di Mondragone
