= Isak Férriz =

Andorran actor and director

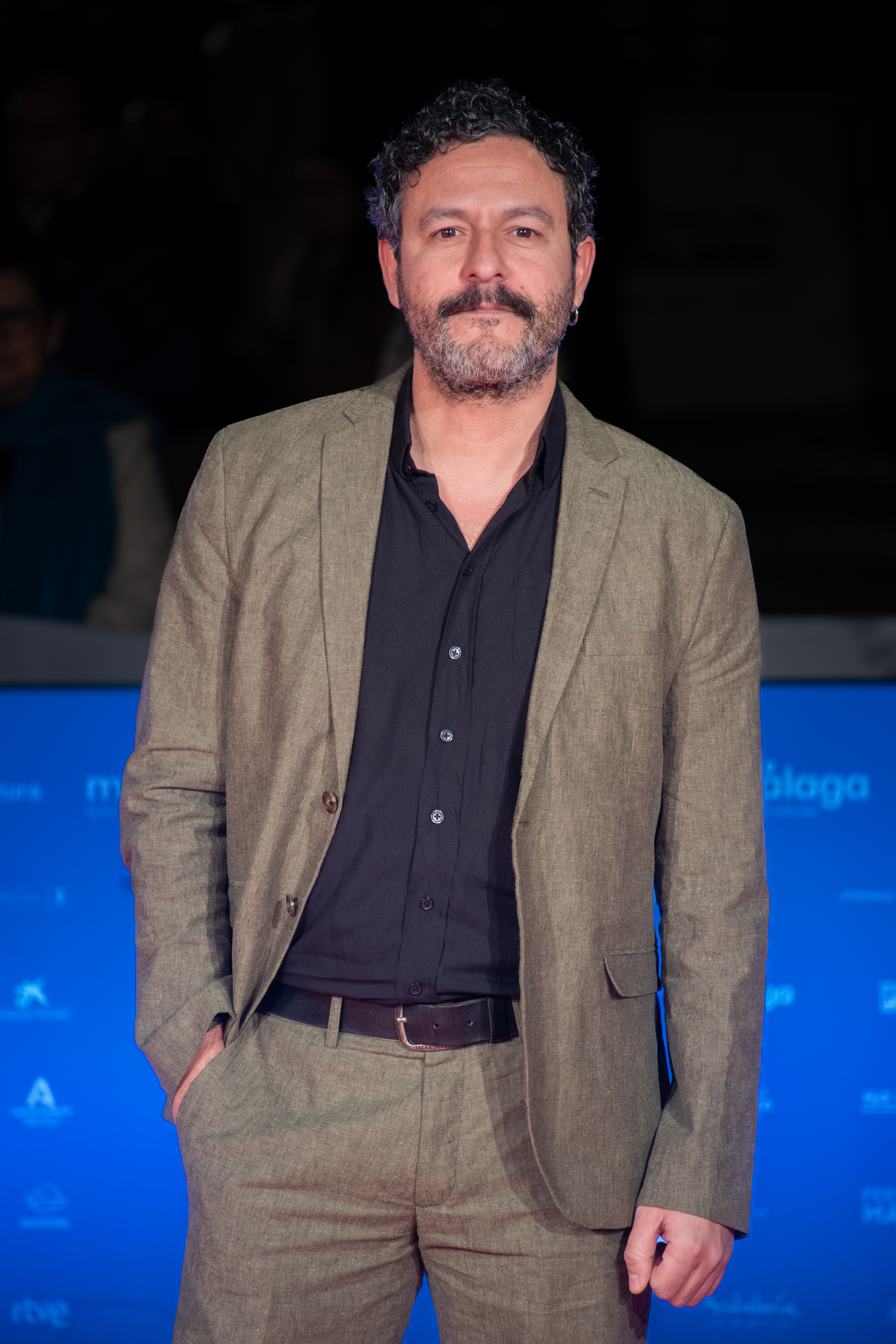
- Férriz in 2024
- Born: Isaac Férriz Álvaro; 20 June 1979 (age 46); Andorra la Vella, Andorra
- Occupations: Actor; director

Isaac "Isak" Férriz Álvaro (born 20 June 1979) is an Andorran-born actor and director based in Barcelona.

== Biography ==
Born in Andorra la Vella on 20 June 1979, Férriz's parents were originally from the area of Gràcia in Barcelona, which he regularly visited when he was a child. He lived in Andorra until he was 18, when he moved to Barcelona, training at the Nancy Tuñón's acting school. His television debut came with a performance in the Laberint d'ombres series, aired on the Catalan public broadcaster. He landed roles in teen dramas such as Al salir de clase, Compañeros and Física o Química, as well as in the Catalan telenovela Ventdelplà.

He starred as the lead character (the 17th-century bandit Serrallonga) in the 2008 television miniseries Serrallonga and as Roberto Pérez (a day laborer who engages in a love triangle with the other two main characters) in the daily television series Bandolera. After starring as the ruthless Daniel Guerrero in the Movistar+ crime drama series Gigantes (2018–2019), Férriz resumed collaboration with director Enrique Urbizu in Libertad, set to play a bandit once again. Later in 2020, Férriz joined the production of the Netflix fantasy thriller series Feria as cast member.

Besides his better-known work as an actor, Férriz has also worked as a director.

== Filmography ==
=== Television ===
Year	Title	Role	Notes	Ref
2008	Serrallonga	Serrallonga	2-part TV miniseries	
2009	90-60-90. Diario secreto de una adolescente	Domenico Maldini		
2010	Física o Química	Luis Parra		
2011	Bandolera	Roberto Pérez	Main	
2015–16	Cites	Martín	Main	
2018–19	Gigantes	Daniel Guerrero	Main	
2021	Libertad	Aceituno	Main (antagonist). The series was also released in a feature film format	
2022	Feria: la luz más oscura (Feria: The Darkest Light)		Main	
2023	El cuerpo en llamas (Burning Body)	Javi		
2024	Asalto al Banco Central (Bank Under Siege)	Francisco "Paco" López		
2025	Ciudad de sombras (City of shadows)	Milo Malart	Netflix 6 episode miniseries	

=== Film ===
Year	Title	Role	Notes	Ref
2009	El cónsul de Sodoma (The Consul of Sodom)	Pep Madern	Supporting	
2011	Hexe Lilli: Die Reise nash Mandolan (Lilly the Witch: The Journey of Mandolan)	Leutnant	Supporting	
2013	Los últimos días (The Last Days)	Javier	Supporting	
2016	Lobos sucios	Miguel Peña		
2017	La niebla y la doncella (The Mist and the Maiden)	Guzmán	Supporting	
2018	Les distàncies (Distances)	Guille		
2020	La mujer ilegal	Oriol Cadenas		
2021	Bajocero (Below Zero)	Montesinos		
2023	Infiesto	Inspector jefe Samuel García		
2024	Tratamos demasiado bien a las mujeres (We Treat Women Too Well)	Bocas		
2024	Lo carga el diablo (Devil Dog Road)	Simón		

== Awards and nominations ==
Year	Award	Category	Work	Result	Ref.
2019	21st Iris Awards	Best Actor	Gigantes	Nominated	
2019	7th MiM Series Awards	Best Drama Actor	Gigantes	Nominated	
