= The Waiting List =

- DVD release cover
- Spanish: Lista de espera
- Directed by: Juan Carlos Tabío
- Written by: Arturo Arango; Juan Carlos Tabío with the participation of Senel Paz
- Produced by: Gerardo Herrero; Camilo Vives; Thierry Forte
- Starring: Tahimí Alvariño; Vladimir Cruz; Jorge Perugorría; Saturnino García; Alina Rodríguez; Noel García
- Edited by: Carmen Frías
- Music by: José María Vitier
- Production companies: Tornasol Films; ICAIC; DMVB; Tabasco Films; Producciones Amaranta; Road Movies Filmproduktion
- Release date: 2000
- Countries: Spain; Cuba; France; Mexico
- Language: Spanish

The Waiting List (Spanish: Lista de espera) is a 2000 comedy-drama film directed and co-written by Juan Carlos Tabío. It was screened in the Un Certain Regard section at the 2000 Cannes Film Festival. It is a co-production among companies from Spain, Cuba, France, and Mexico; including Tornasol Films, ICAIC, DMVB, Tabasco Films, Producciones Amaranta and Road Movies Fillm Produktionen.

In the film, people waiting in a bus station start building a little society of their own.

== Plot ==
The film tells the story of a group of passengers who find themselves at a bus terminal in a small Cuban town; however, none of them can make the journey they need to take, since all the vehicles passing through the terminal have every seat occupied and do not pick up any travelers. In order to reach their destination, they all embark on repairing a vehicle located at the terminal that is in terrible condition.

Due to the delay in the beginning of their respective journeys, a strong sense of community emerges among the group of travelers, so they not only attempt to repair the bus, but also make improvements to the terminal bathrooms and organize meals together. A romance also develops between Emilio and Jacqueline, who was engaged to be married. After the two spend the night together, Jacqueline suggests to the group that they turn the bus terminal into a better place, and together all the travelers paint and fix up the entire space.

In the middle of the work, a guagua (bus) arrives with one available seat to Havana, but none of the travelers wants to take it. They finally decide to offer the seat to the blind man, who refuses to get on because he wishes to continue repairing the terminal bus. Faced with the insistence of the others, he becomes angry and admits before everyone that he is not blind, provoking outrage, especially among the women who had undressed in front of him believing he could not see.

Two of the passengers are reading a book called “Lista de espera” (“Waiting List”), which recounts each of the events taking place at the terminal. One of the stories in the book announces the death of a character, and at the same time Avelino, one of the passengers in transit, dies. Before dying, he asks the others to bury him at the terminal.

In a short time, the passengers have transformed the space into a utopian place where everyone shares in the well-being they have managed to create, with rooms and a library having been set up. Jacqueline, who has abandoned her Spanish fiancé, is expecting Emilio’s child.

Nevertheless, the following morning everyone wakes up and discovers, first of all, that everything has been a dream, and secondly, that they all dreamed the same thing.

Finally, everyone manages to continue on their way using different vehicles.

== Cast ==
- Vladimir Cruz as Emilio
- Thaimí Alvariño as Jacqueline
- Jorge Perugorría as Rolando, el ciego
- Noel García as Fernández
- Alina Rodríguez as Regla
- Saturnino García as Avelino
- Antonio Valero as Antonio
- Jorge Alí as Cristobal
- Hirán Vega as Pedro Luis
- Mijail Mulkay as Manolo
- Leandro Sen as Erick
- Saskia Guanche as Katia
- Serafín García as Santiago
- Amelia Pita as Angelina
- Asseneh Rodriguez as Abuela

== See also ==
- List of Spanish films of 2000
- List of Cuban films
