= Things I Left in Havana =

- Film poster
- Spanish: Cosas que dejé en La Habana
- Directed by: Manuel Gutiérrez Aragón
- Screenplay by: Senel Paz; Manuel Gutiérrez Aragón
- Produced by: Gerardo Herrero
- Starring: Violeta Rodríguez; Jorge Perugorría; Kiti Manver; Broselianda Hernández; Isabel Santos; Daisy Granados; Charo Soriano; Pepón Nieto
- Cinematography: Teo Escamilla
- Edited by: José Salcedo
- Music by: José María Vitier
- Production companies: Sogetel; Tornasol Films
- Release dates: October 1997 (Seminci); 16 January 1998 (Spain)
- Country: Spain
- Language: Spanish

Things I Left in Havana (Spanish: Cosas que dejé en La Habana) is a 1997 Spanish film directed by Manuel Gutiérrez Aragón and co-written by Senel Paz. It stars Violeta Rodríguez, Jorge Perugorría and Kiti Mánver.

== Plot ==
Three sisters from Cuba (Nena, Ludmila and Rosa) move to Madrid, temporarily staying with their aunt María, who exploits them for labour, also intending for them to assimilate to Spanish culture. Nena, an actress wannabe, falls romantically for Igor, a Cuban scoundrel with a heart of gold.

== Cast ==
- Violeta Rodríguez as Nena
- Jorge Perugorría as Igor
- Kiti Manver as Azucena
- Broselianda Hernández as Ludmila
- Isabel Santos as Rosa
- Daisy Granados as María
- Charo Soriano as Lola
- Pepón Nieto as Javier
- Luis Alberto García as Bárbaro
- Isabel Díaz as Nati
- Paco Merino as Adolfo

== Production ==
The screenplay was penned by Manuel Gutiérrez Aragón and Senel Paz. Produced by Gerardo Herrero, the film is a Sogetel and Tornasol Films production, with the participation of Canal+ and the collaboration of Sogepac. The film had a budget of slightly over 200 million ₧.

== Release ==
Things I Left in Havana screened at the 42nd Valladolid International Film Festival in October 1997. The film was theatrically released in Spain on 16 January 1998.

== Accolades ==
| Year | Award | Category | Nominee(s) | Result | Ref. |
|---|---|---|---|---|---|
| 1997 | 42nd Valladolid International Film Festival | Silver Spike | | Won | |
| 1998 | 13th Goya Awards | Best New Actress | Violeta Rodríguez | Nominated | |
| 1998 | 45th Ondas Awards | Best Film Director | Manuel Gutiérrez Aragón | Won | |

== See also ==
- List of Spanish films of 1998
