= Jorge Perugorría =

Cuban actor

- Perugorría in 2026
- Born: 13 August 1965 (age 61); Wajay, Havana, Cuba
- Other name: Pichi
- Citizenship: Cuba; Spain (since 2003)
- Occupations: Actor; film director; painter

Jorge Perugorría Rodríguez (a.k.a. "Pichi," born 13 August 1965) is a Cuban actor, film director and painter. He is well known for his part as Diego in Strawberry and Chocolate (original title in Spanish Fresa y chocolate; co-directed by Tomás Gutiérrez Alea and Juan Carlos Tabío). He recently acted in Steven Soderbergh's Che, with Benicio del Toro and in the original Netflix series Four Seasons in Havana. He lives in Santa Fe, a neighborhood on the outskirts of Havana, with his wife Elsa Maria Fuentes de La Paz and their four children.

== Career ==
Perrugorría studied civil engineering until he turned to theater. He played Shakespeare with the Olga Alonso troupe, and starred in The Glass Menagerie with the Ritan Mountainer troupe. In the early 1990s, Perugorría helped found Havana’s Public Theatre, which started with Jean Genet’s The Maids. In this play, Perugorría acted the difficult part of Clara, working on a real gestural dimension for this feminine character. This led to his first opportunity in cinema.

Perugorría has played in several TV series or short films, but his first cinema success was Fresa y Chocolate (Strawberry and Chocolate), in which he played the part of Diego, a gay young man who meets a straight university student named David. The movie, subtly dealing with tolerance and sexual politics, made Perugorría recognizable as one of Cuba’s most famous actors.

He has since acted in nearly 50 films, including Boceto directed by Tomás Piard and Derecho de asilo by Octavio Cortázar. He has also appeared in Steven Soderbergh’s Che, and directed and acted in Se vende (For Sale), a black comedy about the selling of bones of dead people. He portrays Cuban police detective Conde in Four Seasons in Havana, a Netflix series based on the novels of Cuban writer Leonardo Padura. It is a Spanish production by Tornesol.

He was granted Spanish citizenship by the Spanish Council of Ministers in May 2003.

== Awards/Nominations ==
- In 2015 he was nominated for the Platino Award for his role as Conde, from the Platino Awards for Iberoamerican Cinema.
- In 2014 he won the Special Precolumbian Icon award from the Bogota Film Festival.
- In 2014 he was nominated for the Audience Award from the Havana Film Festival.
- In 2012 he was nominated for the Audience Award from the SXSW Film Festival in Austin, Texas.
- In 2009 he won the Special Jury Award for the film El cuerno de la abundancia from the Mar del Plata Film Festival.
- In 2009 he won the Honorary Award from the Lleida Latin-American Film Festival.
- In 2006 he won a special award for his career accomplishments from the Turia Awards.
- In 2003 he won Special Mention for the film Habana Abierta at the Havana Film Festival.
- In 2003 he won the El Megano Award for the film Habana Abierta at the Havana Film Festival.
- In 2001 he won Golden India Catalina for the film Waiting List from the Cartagena Film Festival.
- In the year 2000 he won the Special Award for the film Volavérunt from the Yoga Awards.
- In 1995 he won Premio Ace for the film Strawberry and Chocolates.
- In 1994 he won the Silver Hugo for the film Strawberry and Chocolates from the Chicago International Film Festival.
- In 1994 he won the Golden Kikito for the film Strawberry and Chocolates from the Gramado Film Festival.
- In 1993 he won Best Actor for the film Strawberry and Chocolates from the Havana Film Festival.

== Filmography ==
=== Director/Producer ===
- 2003: Habana abierta
- 2005: Santiago y la Virgen en la Fiesta del Fuego (documentary short)
- 2010: Afinidades
- 2012: Amor crónico
- 2012: Se vende
- 2015: Fátima o el Parque de la Fraternidad

=== Actor ===
- 1993: Derecho de asilo
- 1993: Los perros tienen hambre (short)
- 1993: Strawberry and Chocolate
- 1994: Maite
- 1995: Dile a Laura que la quiero
- 1995: Guantanamera
- 1995: Shiralad. El regreso de los dioses (TV series)
- 1996: La sal de la vida
- 1996: Bámbola
- 1996: Cachito
- 1996: Edipo alcalde
- 1996: Un asunto privado
- 1997: Amor vertical
- 1997: Clandestine Stories in Havana
- 1997: Life According to Muriel
- 1997: Razor in the Flesh
- 1997: Things I Left in Havana
- 1998: Doña Bárbara
- 1998: Sidoglio Smithee
- 1999: By My Side Again
- 1999: Volavérunt
- 2000: The Waiting List
- 2000: Tierra del Fuego
- 2000: Turbulence
- 2001: Honey for Oshun
- 2001: Vajont - La diga del disonore
- 2002: Nowhere
- 2002: Rancour
- 2003: Más vampiros en La Habana
- 2003: Tánger
- 2004: Caribe
- 2004: Scent of Oak
- 2005: Barrio Cuba
- 2005: Frutas en el café
- 2005: Gaijin - Ama-me Como Sou
- 2005: Hormigas en la boca
- 2005: Queens
- 2006: Virgin Rose
- 2007: Night of the Innocents
- 2007: The Heart of the Earth
- 2008: Horn of Plenty
- 2008: Che: Part One
- 2008: Che: Part Two
- 2008: La mala
- 2010: Afinidades
- 2010: Boleto al paraíso
- 2012-2013: Lynch (TV series)
- 2012: 7 Days in Havana
- 2012: Amor crónico
- 2012: Clara no es nombre de mujer
- 2012: Dragoi ehiztaria
- 2012: Edificio Royal
- 2012: Se Vende
- 2012: Un Amor de Película
- 2014: Boccaccerías Habaneras
- 2014: His Wedding Dress
- 2014: La muerte del gato (short)
- 2014: La pared de las palabras
- 2014: Return to Ithaca
- 2014: Tarde para Ramón (short)
- 2015: Isola Margherita (TV miniseries)
- 2015: Viva
- 2016: Vientos de la Habana (TV miniseries)
- 2016: Un Cuento de Circo & A Love Song
- 2017: Kimura
- 2018: Rubirosa
- 2018: Black is Beltza
- 2018: Havana Kyrie

== Trivia ==
Since 2005, Jorge Perugorría has been one of the patrons of DreamAgo, an international screenwriters association.
