= Marilyn Solaya =

Cuban director, actor, screenwriter, and producer

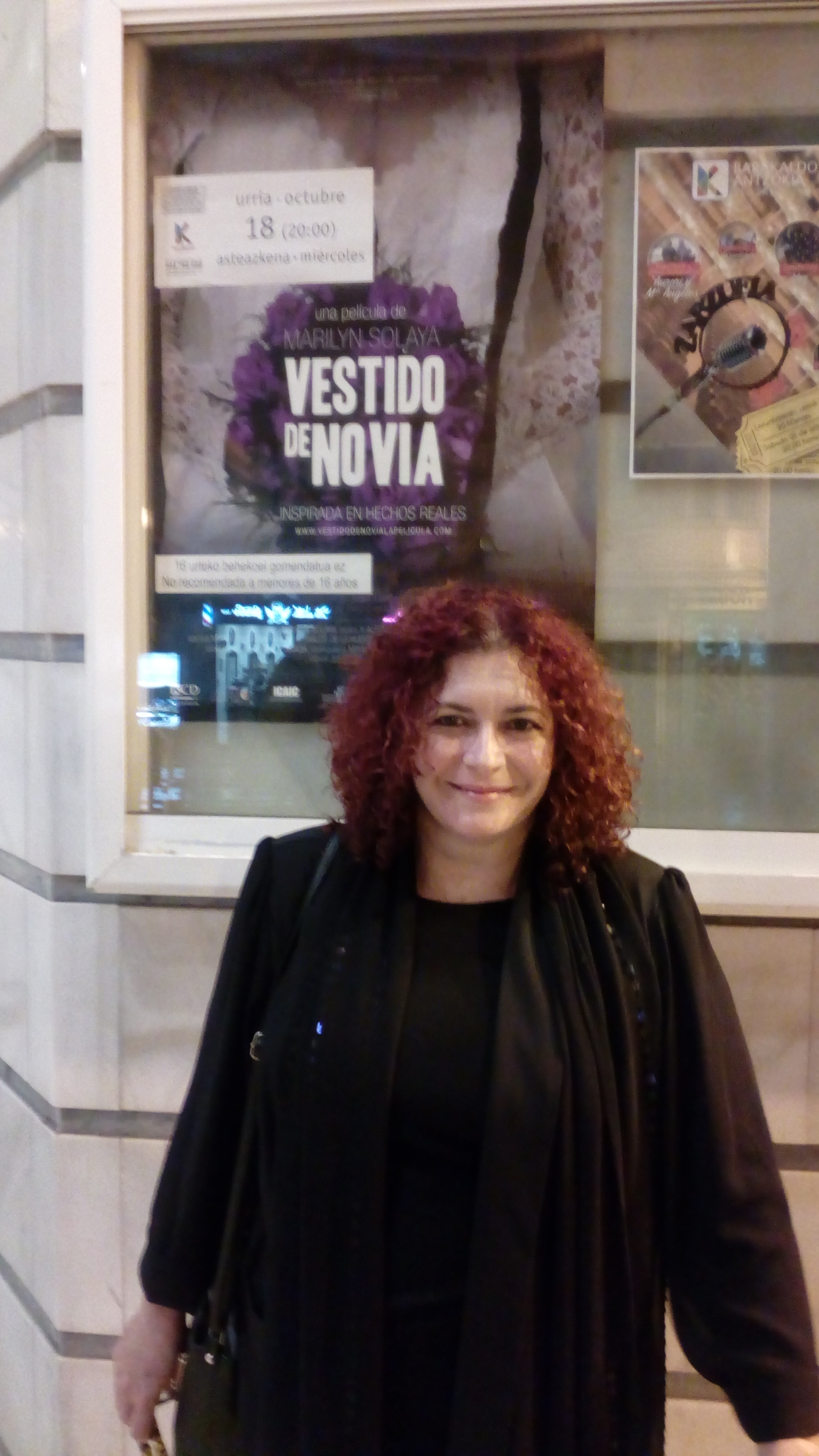
- Marilyn Solaya in 2017.
- Born: August 6, 1970 (age 54)
- Occupation(s): Director and actress
- Years active: 1993 - present

Marilyn Solaya (born 6 August 1970) is a Cuban film director, actor, screenwriter, and producer.

Solaya began a career as an actor in 1993 in Fresa y chocolate.

== Works ==
=== Director ===
- Show Room (1996)
- Alegrías (1999)
- Hasta que la muerte nos separe (2001)
- Mírame mi amor (2002)
- Retamar (2004)
- En el cuerpo equivocado (2010)
- Vestido de novia (2014)
- En busca de un espacio (2019)

=== Screenwriter ===
- Show Room (1996)
- Alegrías (1999)
- Hasta que la muerte nos separe (2001)
- Mírame mi amor (2002)
- Vestido de novia (2014)
- En busca de un espacio (2019)#

=== Actor ===
- Fresa y chocolate (1993)
- Despabílate amor (1996)
- Sensibile (1998)
- Resonancias (1998)
- Omerta III La ley del silencio (1998)

=== Producer ===
- Show Room (1996)
- Alegrías... (1999)
- En busca de un espacio (2019)
