= Strawberry and Chocolate =

1993 Cuban-Mexican film

- US DVD cover
- Spanish: Fresa y chocolate
- Directed by: Tomás Gutiérrez Alea; Juan Carlos Tabío
- Written by: Senel Paz (story and screenplay)
- Produced by: Camilo Vives; Frank Cabrera; Georgina Balzaretti
- Starring: Jorge Perugorría; Vladimir Cruz; Mirta Ibarra; Francisco Gattorno
- Music by: José María Vitier
- Distributed by: Miramax Films (U.S.)
- Release date: 1993
- Running time: 108 minutes
- Countries: Cuba; Mexico
- Language: Spanish

Strawberry and Chocolate (Spanish: Fresa y chocolate) is a 1993 comedy-drama film, directed by Cuban filmmakers Tomás Gutiérrez Alea and Juan Carlos Tabío, based on the short story "The Wolf, the Forest and the New Man" (in Spanish, El lobo, el bosque y el hombre nuevo). Senel Paz wrote the short story in 1990 and also wrote the screenplay for the film. It was the first Cuban film to be nominated for an Academy Award. It is an international co-production between Cuba and Mexico.

== Plot ==
The story takes place in Havana, Cuba, in 1979. David (Vladimir Cruz) is rejected by Vivian, who marries an older and wealthier man. It is revealed that he is a university student when he meets Diego (Jorge Perugorría), a gay artist unhappy with the Castro regime's attitude toward the homosexual community as well as the censored conceptualization of culture. David's heterosexual classmate, Miguel (Francisco Gattorno), plans to use David to spy on Diego, a person whom they see as aberrant and dangerous to the Communist cause. Diego, for his part, initiates the friendship with sexual intentions, but David mostly rejects his advances.

Although David initially chafes at the idea of being Diego's "baby", he decides to do so to relay information back to Miguel. The two form a tenuous friendship in the process of this spying, and David makes it clear that their relationship will be platonic. Nancy, a "vigilance" who lives above Diego, attempts suicide as David arrives one day, and he ends up donating blood so that she can recover. As David spends more and more time with Diego, he argues with him about Communism, sexuality, and what is truly revolutionary. After constantly reporting their activities to Miguel, David eventually erupts, telling Miguel that Diego has principles despite his sexuality. Vivian tries to reconnect with David and begin an affair, but he finally rejects her advances. David begins to show more signs of affection for Diego, buying him flowers and posting Marxist icons in Diego's room, and letting him read his manuscript.

In a side plot, Diego and German, his artist protégé and sexual partner, are unable to exhibit their full collection of work. In this process, the two have a falling out, and Diego sends an angry letter to the museum curators of Cuba. This leads to his firing and an inability to find work outside of manual labor due to his blacklisting by the government. Diego tells this to Nancy, who has developed a romantic interest in David. In a gesture of friendship to both parties, he decides to set Nancy and David up, and David loses his virginity to Nancy. In the days after, Miguel comes to Diego's apartment, accusing David of being homosexual.

Diego eventually decides to leave the country, but is unable to keep it a secret from David. He confesses his love for David and reveals that it was not denying rumors of being in a relationship with David that led to David's false "outing" as a gay man. Despite this, David embraces Diego with a hug, leaving their future relationship ambiguous.

== Cast ==
- Jorge Perugorría as Diego
- Vladimir Cruz as David
- Mirta Ibarra as Nancy
- Francisco Gattorno as Miguel
- Joel Angelino as German
- Marilyn Solaya as Vivian
- Andrés Cortina as Santeria priest
- Antonio Carmona as Boyfriend

== Reception ==
Chicago Sun-Times film critic Roger Ebert commented that "nothing unfolds as we expect. Strawberry and Chocolate is not a movie about the seduction of a body, but about the seduction of a mind. It is more interested in politics than sex—unless you count sexual politics, since to be homosexual in Cuba is to make an anti-authoritarian statement whether you intend it or not."

The title refers to a comment made by Diego that immediately proves to David that Diego is gay when at Havana's Coppelia (ice cream parlor) he chooses strawberry ice cream even though chocolate (vastly more popular) is available.

== Historical context and impact ==
After The Cuban Revolution in 1959, homophobia became engrained in the law and society, with men being arrested for even appearing in a way that was not traditionally masculine, for example having hair that was too long. In 1979, homosexuality was decriminalized in Cuba through the 1979 Cuban Penal Code, although attitudes towards gay people remained negative, and gay people were strongly encouraged to leave the country by the government. The negative attitude towards gay people was slow to change, with the 1981 release of In Defense of Love, a publication from Cuba’s Ministry of Culture encouraging equal treatment of queer people. Castro would go back on his words and actions during an interview in 2010, expressing regret for his homophobia.

Following the release of the film, conversations began about homosexuality in Cuba, and this open dialogue sparked a more positive attitude towards queer people in Cuba, with same-sex marriage being legalized in 2022. The film has been criticized by some for only demonstrating “all-or-nothing” ideology between the perspectives the main characters, as well as only appealing to the state and their redemption for their treatment of queer people as opposed to challenging the state and the homophobia that occurred during the revolution.

== Reception ==
=== Critical response ===
On review aggregator Rotten Tomatoes, the film holds an approval rating of 80% based on 20 reviews, with an average rating of 6.6/10. The website's critical consensus states: "Strawberry and Chocolate movingly depicts the budding relationship between two men against the backdrop of a pivotal moment in Cuban history".

=== Awards and nominations ===
==== Won ====
1995

- Goya Award for Best Spanish-Language Foreign Film (Mejor Película Extranjera de Habla Hispana)
- Premio ACE awards: Cinema—Best Film, Cinema—Best Director, Cinema—Best Actor (Perugorría), and Cinema—Best Supporting Actor (Cruz)
- Sundance Film Festival: Special Jury Prize: Special Mention

1994

- 44th Berlin International Film Festival: Silver Berlin Bear—Special Jury Prize, Teddy—Best Feature Film
- Gramado Film Festival (Brazil): Audience Award, Kikito Critics Prize, and Golden Kikito awards in the categories of Best Latin Film, Best Actor (tie between Cruz and Perugorría), and Best Supporting Actress (Ibarra)

1993

- Havana Film Festival: Grand Coral—First Prize, Audience Award, FIPRESCI Prize, OCIC Award, ARCI-NOVA Award, and the categories of Best Direction, Best Actor (Perugorría), Best Actress (Luisina Brando), Best Supporting Actress (Ibarra), and Best Screenplay.

=== Nominated ===
- Academy Award for Best Foreign Language Film, 1994
- Golden Berlin Bear, 1994 Berlin International Film Festival

== See also ==
- List of Cuban films
- Gay rights in Cuba
- List of submissions to the 67th Academy Awards for Best Foreign Language Film
- List of Cuban submissions for the Academy Award for Best Foreign Language Film
