= Akcja pod Arsenałem =

1978 Polish film

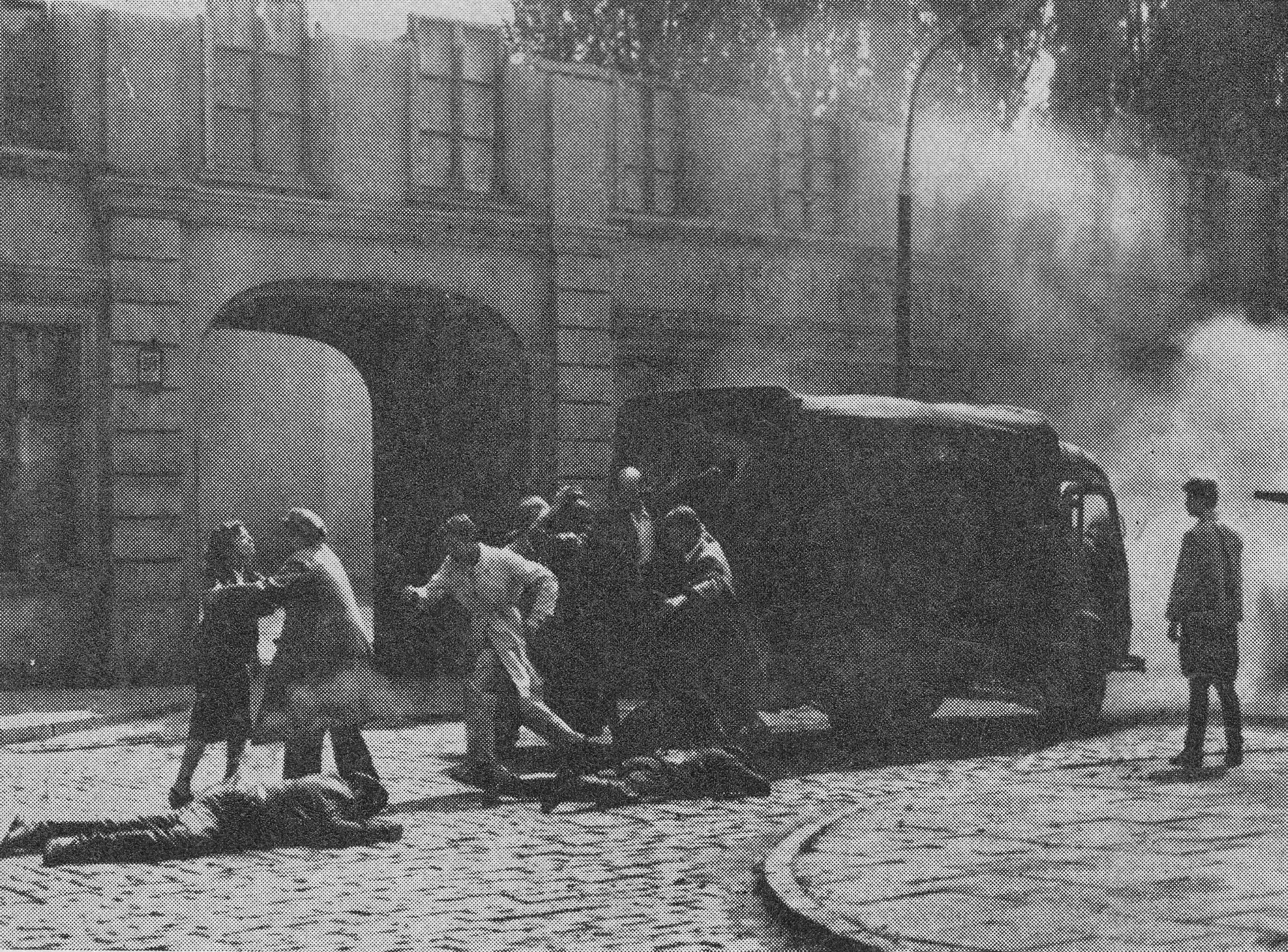
- Scene from the film
- Directed by: Jan Łomnicki
- Written by: Jerzy Stefan Stawiński
- Starring: Mirosław Konarowski, Ryszard Gajewski, Cezary Morawski
- Cinematography: Jerzy Gościk
- Music by: Piotr Hertel
- Production company: Polska Studio "Iluzjon"
- Release date: February 13, 1978
- Running time: 93 min
- Country: Poland
- Language: Polish

Akcja pod Arsenałem (English: Operation Arsenal) is a Polish historical film, based on the novel Kamienie na szaniec by Aleksander Kamiński, released in 1978 and directed by Jan Łomnicki. Set during World War II, it tells the story of the Operation Arsenal, in which boy scouts of the Grey Ranks freed a truck carrying prisoners, among whom was Jan Bytnar.

== Plot ==
A historical film based on real events, it tells the story of three scouts, Tadeusz Zawadzki „Zośka”, Jan Bytnar „Rudy” and Maciej Dawidowski „Alek”, fighting in the Gray Ranks against the German occupiers.

On March 23, 1943, "Zośka" and "Alek" learn that "Rudy" has been arrested by the Warsaw Gestapo. They decide to rescue their friend from the hands of the torturers tormenting him in the Pawiak prison and at the Gestapo headquarters in al. J. Ch. Szucha 25.

On March 26, 1943, in the area of the Arsenal, at the intersection of Bielańska, Długa and Nalewki Streets, scouts from the Gray Ranks Assault Groups in a daring attack recapture "Rudy" from the Gestapo headquarters, along with twenty other prisoners with him. However, “Rudy” had been tortured during the investigation by the Germans and dies a few days later in the hands of his friends.

== Cast ==
- Ryszard Gajewski as Aleksy Dawidowski "Alek"
- Mirosław Konarowski as Tadeusz Zawadzki "Zośka"
- Cezary Morawski as Jan Bytnar "Rudy"
- Magdalena Wołłejko as Barbara Sapińska
- Danuta Kowalska as Maryla Dawidowska
- Zbigniew Zapasiewicz as Stanisław Bytnar
- Lidia Korsakówna as Zdzisława Bytnarowa
- Joanna Pacuła as Duśka Bytnarówna
- Wojciech Alaborski as Florian Marciniak "Florian"
- Damian Damięcki as Mieczysław Kurkowski "Mietek"
- Zbigniew Sawan
- Maria Mamona as Hanka
- Jan Piechociński as doctor
- Jan Englert as Stanisław Broniewski "Stefan Orsza"
- Piotr Grabowski (born 1947)
- Ryszard Bacciarelli
- Karl Sturm as Schulz
- Werner Toelcke as Lange
- Jan Czechowicz as Tadeusz Chojko "Bolec"
- Piotr Dejmek as Zygmunt Kaczyński "Wesoły"
- Adam Ferency as Heniek Ostrowski
- Karol Gruza as Jerzy Gawin "Słoń"
- Ryszard Jabłoński as Józef Saski "Katoda"
- Ryszard Dreger as Jan Rodowicz "Anoda"
- Emilian Kamiński as Andrzej Wolski "Jur"
- Piotr Krasicki as Witold Bartnicki "Kadłubek"
- Zbigniew Kuś as Tadeusz Krzyżewicz "Buzdygan"
- Leszek Mikołajczyk as Tadeusz Szajnoch "Cielak"
- Janusz Mond as Eugeniusz Koecher "Kołczan"
- Andrzej Precigs as Konrad Okolski "Kuba"
- Rafał Spałek as Sławomir Bittner "Maciek"
- Paweł Wawrzecki as Jerzy Zborowski "Jeremi"
- Adam Gessler as Jerzy Trzciński "Tytus"
- Jan Owczynnikow as Wiesław Krajewski "Sem"
- Jan Kulczycki as Władysław Cieplak "Giewont"
