= 7 Days in Havana =

2012 Cuban anthology film

- Theatrical release poster
- Directed by: Benicio del Toro; Pablo Trapero; Julio Medem; Elia Suleiman; Gaspar Noé; Juan Carlos Tabío; Laurent Cantet
- Written by: Leonardo Padura; Benicio del Toro; Pablo Trapero; Julio Medem; Elia Suleiman; Gaspar Noé; Juan Carlos Tabío; Laurent Cantet
- Produced by: Laurent Baudens; Didar Domehri; Álvaro Longoria; Gaël Nouaille; Fabien Pisani
- Starring: Daniel Brühl; Emir Kusturica; Elia Suleiman; Josh Hutcherson
- Cinematography: Daniel Aranyó; Diego Dussuel; Gaspar Noé
- Edited by: Santiago Esteves; Thomas Fernandez; Rich Fox; Berta Frías; Véronique Lange; Julio Medem; Gaspar Noé; Alex Rodríguez; Zack Stoff; Pablo Trapero
- Music by: Xavi Turull
- Production companies: Morena Films; Full House
- Distributed by: Rézo Films (France)
- Release dates: 23 May 2012 (Cannes); 30 May 2012 (France)
- Running time: 129 minutes
- Countries: Cuba; Spain; France
- Languages: Spanish; English; Serbian
- Budget: €3 million

7 Days in Havana (Spanish: 7 días en La Habana) is a 2012 Spanish-language anthology film. Set during a week in the Cuban capital Havana, the film features one segment for each day, each segment directed by a different filmmaker. The directors are Julio Medem, Laurent Cantet, Juan Carlos Tabío, Benicio del Toro, Gaspar Noé, Pablo Trapero and Elia Suleiman. The screenplay was written by the Cuban novelist Leonardo Padura Fuentes. The film is a co-production of companies in Spain, France and Cuba. It was shot on location in Havana.

== Segments ==
- "El Yuma" (Monday, Benicio del Toro)
- "Jam Session" (Tuesday, Pablo Trapero)
- "La tentación de Cecilia" (Wednesday, Julio Medem)
- "Diary of a Beginner" (Thursday, Elia Suleiman)
- "Ritual" (Friday, Gaspar Noé)
- "Dulce amargo" (Saturday, Juan Carlos Tabío)
- "La fuente" (Sunday, Laurent Cantet)

== Cast ==
- Daniel Brühl as Spanish Businessman
- Emir Kusturica as himself
- Elia Suleiman as himself
- Josh Hutcherson as Teddy Atkins
- Vladimir Cruz
- Mirta Ibarra
- Jorge Perugorria
- Alexander Abreu (a sensational musician and international star, founder of Havana d'Primera) as Albert

== Production ==
The film is a co-production between Spain's Morena Films and France's Full House, in association with Cuba's Havana Club International. It had a budget of around €3 million. Filming took place in Havana from 4 March to 6 May 2011.

== Release ==
The film competed in the Un Certain Regard section at the 2012 Cannes Film Festival.

== Reception ==
On Rotten Tomatoes the film had an approval rating of 40% based on reviews from 15 critics.
