= Sofía Oria =

Spanish actress

- Born: 8 June 2002 (age 22); Madrid, Spain
- Occupation: Actress
- Years active: 2012–present

Sofía Oria (Madrid, Spain; born June 8, 2002) is a Spanish actress known for playing Carmencita in the Goya-winning film Blancanieves and Carmen in the Movistar+ series Gigantes.

== Biography ==
Sofía Oria was born on June 8, 2002, in Madrid, Spain. She took acting classes with Nuria Soler, and after completing her high school studies, she began studying psychology and criminology.

== Trajectory ==
Shortly after her tenth birthday, she participated in the Goya-winning film Blancanieves in 2012, playing Carmencita. That same year, she also participated in the film Invasor, directed by Daniel Calparsoro. In 2015, she joined the cast of the Telecinco blockbuster Las aventuras del Capitán Alatriste, which was filmed in 2013 and in which she played Dorotea. After taking a few years off to focus on her studies, she returned to the world of acting in 2018 with the Movistar+ series Gigantes.

In 2020, she appeared as a supporting actress in Caronte, where she played Irene, and Mentiras, where she played Amal. A year later, she played Reina in the Movistar+ series Libertad. In addition, she premiered the film Mamá o papá, alongside Paco León and Miren Ibarguren, directed by Dani de la Orden. Her leading role was also announced for the film ¡Mamá está en las redes!, directed by Daniela Fejerman.

== Filmography ==
=== Cinema ===
Year	Title	Character	Directed by
2012	Blancanieves	Carmencita	Pablo Berger
2012	Invasor	Pilar	Daniel Calparsoro
2021	Mamá o papá	Alexia	Dani de la Orden
2022	¡Mamá está en las redes!	Milena	Daniela Fejerman

=== Television ===
Year	Title	Character	Channel	Duration
2015	Las aventuras del Capitán Alatriste	Dorotea	Telecinco	Recurring cast; 9 episodes
2018 – 2019	Gigantes	Carmen Guerrero	Movistar+	Main cast; 11 episodes
2020	Caronte	Irene	Amazon Prime Video	Recurring cast; 8 episodes
2020	Mentiras	Amal	Atresplayer	Recurring cast; 6 episodes
2021	Libertad	Reina	Movistar+	Main cast; 5 episodes
