= Vladimir Cruz =

Cuban actor

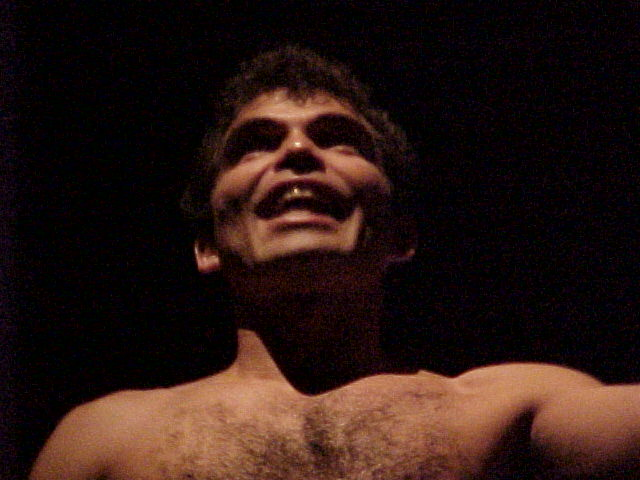
- Vladimir Cruz
- Born: Vladimir Cruz Marrero; 26 July 1965 (age 61); Placetas, Villa Clara, Cuba
- Education: Instituto Superior de Arte
- Occupations: Actor; Screenwriter; Playwright; Film director Theatre director
- Years active: 1986–present
- Spouse: Raquel Ramos
- Children: 2
- Website: www.muchoartemanagement.com

Vladimir Cruz Marrero (born 26 July 1965) is a Cuban actor, screenwriter, playwright, film and theatre director. He is perhaps best known for his role in the film Strawberry and Chocolate (1994).

== Career ==
Cruz made his acting debut on the stage as an amateur actor in 1981. He then began to study at the Instituto Superior de Arte in 1983 and graduated in 1988 with a licentiate degree in performing arts.

He became well known for his supporting role in the film Strawberry and Chocolate (1994), which received a nomination for the Academy Award for Best Foreign Language Film and many awards.

He also wrote plays and screenplays as well as directed plays and films, notably Afinidades (2010).

He has an extensive career in film, theater and television. He has recently appeared in the film Los buenos demonios (2018) and the television series Narcos: Mexico (2018), the former of which earned him the Silver Biznaga for Best Supporting Actor at the Málaga Spanish Film Festival.

== Filmography ==
=== Director ===
- 2005: ¿Soy yo acaso el guardián de mi hermano?
- 2010: Afinidades (co-directed with Jorge Perugorría)

=== Screenwriter ===
- 2005: ¿Soy yo acaso el guardián de mi hermano?
- 2010: Afinidades

=== Actor ===
- 1987: Capablanca
- 1987: Hoy como ayer
- 1990: La botija (1 episode - "Teo joven") (TV series)
- 1994: Fresa y chocolate a.k.a. Strawberry and Chocolate as David
- 1995: ¡Ay, Señor, Señor! (1 episode - "Cuestión de huevos") (TV series)
- 1996: Turno de oficio: Diez años después (2 episodes as Javier -- "Cabos atados", parts 1 and 2) (TV series)
- 1997: Cuba libre - velocipedi ai tropici as Carlos
- 1997: La deuda as Hildebrando Cardona, the groom
- 1997: Little Tropikana
- 1998: La rumbera
- 1998: La noche por delante (1 episode) (TV series)
- 1998: A las once en casa (1 episode as Fidel in "De mal en peor") (TV series)
- 2000: Un paraíso bajo las estrellas as Sergito
- 2000: The Waiting List as Emilio
- 2000: El comisario (1 episode—24 Horas") (TV series)
- 2001: Policías, en el corazón de la calle as Samuel Noriega (8 episodes) (TV series)
- 2003: De colores (TV movie)
- 2003: Viva Sapato! as Carlos
- 2003: Arcibel's Game as Arata
- 2004: Aquí no hay quien viva as Samuel (1 episode - "Érase un matrimonio de conveniencia") (TV series)
- 2005: ...al fin, el mar as Pablo
- 2005: ¿Soy yo acaso el guardián de mi hermano?
- 2006: The Wooden Box as Jorge
- 2006: La dársena de poniente as Martín (13 episodes) (TV series)
- 2008: Che -- as Ramiro Valdés Menéndez in Part One
- 2008: La mala as Chucho
- 2008: Horn of Plenty as Jacinto
- 2010: Afinidades
- 2011: Las razones del corazón as Nicolás
- 2012: 7 días en La Habana
- 2014: La ignorancia de la sangre
- 2014: The Human Thing (Cuba-Perú) Directed by Gerardo Chijona
- 2015: Winds from Havana (Cuba-Spain-Germany) Directed by Felix Viscarret
- 2016: The Good Demons (Cuba-Spain) Directed by Gerardo Chijona
- 2022: Love in the Dark (Cuba) Directed by Gerardo Chijona

Shorts

- 1999: Muertesita, una historia de amor as Vincent (short)
- 2004: Marco línea perdida (short)
- 2005: Civilizados (short)
- 2010: La ventaja del Sicario as Sicario (short)
- 2019: Habana me matas (Spain) directed by Patricia Luna

== Theatre ==
=== Actor ===
- 1986: S.O.S, una situación terriblemente delicada, written by Jan Solovic and directed by Maria Elena Ortega
- 1988: El Alma buena de Tsé Chuang, written by Bertolt Brecht and directed by Maria Elena Ortega
- 1989: Accidente, written by Roberto Orihuela and directed by Carlos Pérez Peña.
- 1990: Tu parte de Culpa, written by Senel Paz and directed by Carlos Pérez Peña
- 1990: Calle Cuba nª 80 bajo la lluvia, written by Rafael González and directed by Carlos Pérez Peña
- 1991: Contar y Cantar, written by Onelio Jorge Cardoso and directed by Sergio González
- 1991: Fabriles, written by Reinaldo Montero and directed by Carlos Pérez Peña
- 1993: Asudiansam, written and directed by Ricardo Muñoz Caravaca
- 1994: A la vuela, vuela... año 1900 tanto, written and directed by Ricardo Muñoz Caravaca
- 1995: No le digas que la quieres, written by Senel Paz and directed by Vladimir Cruz
- 1995: El espejo en el espejo, written by Michael Ende and directed by Vladimir Cruz
- 1996: Fresa y Chocolate (I), written by Senel Paz and directed by Hugo Medrano
- 1998: Fresa y Chocolate (II), written by Senel Paz and directed by Carlos Díaz
- 2000: Hoy no puedo ir a trabajar porque estoy enamorado, written by Iñigo Ramírez de Haro and directed by Natalia Menéndez
- 2001: La Historia del Soldado, written by Stravinski-Ramuz and directed by José Luis García Sánchez
- 2003: El sueño de una noche de verano, written by William Shakespeare, directed by Miguel Narros
- 2004: Tirano banderas, written by Valle-Inclán and directed by Nieves Gámez
- 2006: Huis clos (sin salida), written by Jean-Paul Sartre, directed by Tony Suárez
- 2007: La divina filotea (auto sacramental), written by Calderón de la Barca, directed by Pedro Mari Sánchez
- 2009: Don Juan Tenorio, written by José Zorrilla, directed by Jesús Prieto
- 2009: Fuenteovejuna, written by Lope de Vega, directed by Liuba Cid

== Awards ==
Wins

- 1994: Won Golden Kikito for category "Best actor" at Gramado Film Festival for his role as David in Fresa y chocolate (joint award with Jorge Perugorría)
- 1994: Won UNEAC Award of "Best actor in a film" by Unión Nacional de Escritores y Artistas de Cuba
- 1994: Won Panambí Award as "best actor" at the Festival de Asunción (Paraguay)
- 1995: Won for category "Cinema - Best Supporting Actor" at Premios ACE for his role in Fresa y chocolate as David
- 2009: Won Special Jury Award for his role in Horn of Plenty as Jacinto at Mar del Plata Film Festival (joint with 8 other cast members)

Nominations

- 2008: Nominated for category "Supporting Performance, Male" at the Spanish Actors Union Awards
