= Las aventuras del capitán Alatriste (TV series) =

Spanish television series

- Also known as: The Adventures of Captain Alatriste; El capitan
- Genre: Adventure; Historical drama
- Based on: Las aventuras del capitán Alatriste by Arturo Pérez-Reverte
- Screenplay by: Alberto Macías; Curro Royo; Carlos Molinero; Marisol Farré; David Muñoz
- Directed by: Enrique Urbizu; Norberto López Amado; Salvador Calvo; Luis Oliveros; Alberto Ruiz Rojo
- Country of origin: Spain
- Original language: Spanish
- No. of seasons: 1
- No. of episodes: 13

Production
- Running time: 70 min (approx.)
- Production companies: Mediaset España; Beta Film; DLO Producciones

Original release
- Network: Telecinco
- Release: 7 January – 1 April 2015

Las aventuras del capitán Alatriste is a Spanish adventure television series set in the early 17th century, consisting of an adaptation of the Captain Alatriste novel series by Arturo Pérez-Reverte, starring Aitor Luna in the lead role. It aired from January 2015 to April 2015 on Telecinco.

== Premise ==
The fiction takes place in the first half of the 17th century. It follows the adventures of the Captain Alatriste, taking him—besides Madrid—to Paris and Vatican City.

== Cast ==
- Aitor Luna as Diego Alatriste.
- Natasha Yarovenko as María de Castro
- Lucía Jiménez as Caridad la Lebrijana
- Patricia Vico as Teresa de Alquézar
- Miguel Hermoso as Francisco de Quevedo
- Filippo Sbalchiero as Gualterio Malatesta
- Gary Piquer as Count-Duke of Olivares
- Marcos Ruiz as Íñigo de Balboa y Aguirre
- Carmen Sánchez as Angélica de Alquezar
- Rafael Cebrián as Count of Guadalmedina
- Manel Barceló as Fray Emilio Bocanegra
- Luis Callejo as Luis de Alquézar
- Alfonso Sánchez as Sebastián Copons
- Diana Gómez as Infanta Anna.
- William Miller as the Duke of Buckingham
- Constantin von Jascheroff as the Prince of Wales
- Aura Garrido as Inés de Castro
- Daniel Alonso as Felipe IV
- Manuel Gancedo as Domine Pérez
- Ángel Solo as Saldaña
- Enrique Martínez as Rafael de Cózar
- Janka Erdely as Isabel de Borbón
- Sofía Oria as Dorotea
- Lluís Bou as Vasco
- Arly Jover as Madame de Brissac

== Production ==
Las aventuras del capitán Alastriste consists of an adaptation of the novel series of the same name by Arturo Pérez Reverte, known as "Captain Alatriste" in English. The screenplay was authored by Alberto Macías, Curro Royo, Carlos Molinero, Marisol Farré and David Muñoz.

Produced by Mediaset España and Beta Film in collaboration with DLO Producciones, the series was shot in the Korda Studios in Budapest, Hungary. Episodes were directed by Enrique Urbizu, Norberto López Amado, Salvador Calvo, Luis Oliveros and Alberto Ruiz Rojo.

The series premiered on 7 January 2015. The first episode drew mediocre ratings, particularly taking into account the series was a blockbuster production and it had been heavily promoted. Interest plummeted afterwards.

It also became the target of fierce criticism already before the airing of the first episode, including criticism by the union of audio visual technicians for the choice of Hungary as shooting location. Pérez-Reverte himself was irritated by some historical implausibilities, the "excessive coloring" of the series instead of the gloomy cinematography imagined by the author as well as by the programming of the episodes after a brief recap of Gran Hermano VIP, although he defended the performance of Aitor Luna as a "very worthy" Alatriste.

Paolo Vasile, CEO of Mediaset España, was also reportedly unconvinced of the series before its release. Following the dismal ratings in prime time, the channel decided to extend the running time of Gran Hermano VIP and thus relegate the series to the late night slot.The series' finale aired on 1 April 2015, with a 5.4% share and 486,000 viewers. Overall, the series averaged 1,049,000 viewers and a meagre 7.2% audience share.

== Episodes ==
Series	Episodes	Originally released			Viewers	Share (%)	Ref.
Series	Episodes	First released	Last released	Network	Viewers	Share (%)	Ref.
1	13	7 January 2015	1 April 2015	Telecinco	1,049,000	7.2	

=== Season 1 ===
This is a caption
No. in season	Title	Directed by	Written by	Original release date	Viewers (millions)	Share (%)
1	"Los dos ingleses"	Enrique Urbizu	Alberto Macías, Carlos Molinero, Curro Royo	7 January 2015	2,487,000	13.4
2	"Con la soga al cuello"	Enrique Urbizu	Alberto Macías, Arturo Pérez-Reverte, Curro Royo	14 January 2015	1,735,000	9.3
3	"Al servicio de su majestad"	Luis Oliveros	Alberto Macías, Curro Royo	21 January 2015	1,290,000	6.9
4	"Un soldado de Tercio"	Luis Oliveros	Alberto Macías, Jacobo Delgado, Marisol Ferré	28 January 2015	1,191,000	7.0
5	"Como la sangre"	Salvador Calvo	Alberto Macías, Carlos Molinero	4 February 2015	991,000	6.4
6	"Entre lobos"	Salvador Calvo	Alberto Macías, David Muñoz	11 February 2015	1,011,000	6.9
7	"Herida que duele y no se siente"	Norberto López Amado	Alberto Macías, Carlos Molinero	18 February 2015	777,000	6.1
8	"Una tregua con el diablo"	Norberto López Amado	Alberto Macías, Curro Royo	25 February 2015	687,000	5.4
9	"Fugitivos"	Norberto López Amado	Alberto Macías, Curro Royo	4 March 2015	670,000	5.7
10	"Yo mato"	Alberto Ruiz Rojo	Carlos Molinero, Alberto Macías	11 March 2015	609,000	7.1
11	"La muerte de Martín Saldaña"	Alberto Ruiz Rojo	Alberto Macías, David Muñoz, Marisol Ferré	18 March 2015	657,000	7.2
12	"La retirada de Madrid"	Salvador Calvo	Alberto Macías, Carlos Molinero	31 March 2015	581,000	6.1
13	"Fin de partida"	Salvador Calvo	Alberto Macías, Curro Royo	1 April 2015	486,000	5.4

== Sites ==
- Telecinco.es
- IMDb
