= Tell Laura I Love Her (film) =

- Theatrical release poster
- Spanish: Dile a Laura que la quiero
- Directed by: José Miguel Juárez
- Screenplay by: José Miguel Juárez; Antonio Oliver; Álvaro Fernández Armero
- Produced by: Eduardo Campoy
- Starring: Jorge Perugorría; Ana Álvarez; Nancho Novo; Mabel Lozano; Toni Cantó
- Cinematography: José Luis Alcaine
- Edited by: Luis Manuel del Valle
- Music by: Mario de Benito
- Production companies: Cartel; Aleph Producciones
- Distributed by: Columbia TriStar Films de España (Spain)
- Release dates: 25 August 1995 (Spain); 6 February 1997 (Argentina)
- Running time: 100 minute
- Countries: Spain; Argentina
- Language: Spanish

Tell Laura I Love Her (Spanish: Dile a Laura que la quiero) is a 1995 romantic comedy film directed by José Miguel Juárez. It stars Jorge Perugorría and Ana Álvarez.

== Plot ==
Record-company producer Jorge and photographer Laura are a couple. Conflict arises when the Jorge cheats on Laura with his workmate Estrella. Jorge tries to win Laura back.

== Cast ==
- Jorge Perugorría as Jorge
- Ana Álvarez as Laura
- Toni Cantó as Nacho
- Mabel Lozano
- Nancho Novo
- Jessica Schultz as Estrella
- Paco Maestre as Donato
- Josu Ormaetxe a Perinal
- Conrado San Martín as López
- Patricia Vico as Irene
- Patricia Pérez as Elena
- Goya Toledo as Eva
- Nathalie Seseña
- Clara Sanchis

== Production ==
The film is a Spanish-Argentine co-production by Cartel and Aleph Producciones with the participation of Antena 3 TV and Canal+.

== Release ==
Tell Laura I Love Her was released theatrically in Spain on 25 August 1995, and in Argentina on 6 February 1997.

== Reception ==
Al Goodman of The International Herald Tribune found the joy of the film in "a fast start, some genuinely funny vignettes and the mastery of leading actor Jorge Perugorría", citing otherwise as the element dragging down the film a "weak script that slips into a trite ending".

Luis Martínez of El País wrote that "without complications and with cleanliness, the director achieves a piece that, if not rounded, at least rolls, which is what matters".

== See also ==
- List of Spanish films of 1995
- List of Argentine films of 1997
