= Inferno Below =

2003 Italian television miniseries

- Written by: Laura Toscano; Franco Marotta
- Directed by: Antonio Frazzi; Andrea Frazzi
- Starring: Claudio Amendola; Maria Grazia Cucinotta
- Composer: Luis Bacalov
- Original language: Italian

Production
- Producer: Angelo Rizzoli
- Cinematography: Fabio Zamarion
- Running time: 200 min.

Original release
- Network: Rai 1
- Release: 2003

Inferno Below (Italian: Marcinelle) is a 2003 Italian television miniseries directed by Antonio and Andrea Frazzi and starring Claudio Amendola and Maria Grazia Cucinotta.

== Cast ==
- Claudio Amendola as Antonino
- Maria Grazia Cucinotta as Santina
- Elena Arvigo as Carmelina
- Francesco Siciliano as Turi Calò
- Gioele Dix as Rodolfo Cammara
- Giorgio Gobbi as Nestore Venanzi
- Lorenza Indovina as Angela Venanzi
- Luciano Scarpa as Tano Lo Faro
- Mauro Marino as Don Vito
- Pierfrancesco Poggi as Toni Nardi
- Rolando Ravello as Pino Calabrò
- Antonio Manzini as Duilio
- Arturo Paglia as Michele Marino
- Wojciech Alaborski as Lumbard
- Agnieszka Czekanska as Delanoi's Wife
- Maciej Damiecki as Constantini
