= Juan Carlos Tabío =

Cuban film director (1943–2021)

Juan Carlos Tabío (3 September 1943 – 18 January 2021) was a Cuban film director and screenwriter. His film Strawberry and Chocolate (1994), which he co-directed with Tomás Gutiérrez Alea, won a Silver Bear - Special Jury Prize at the 44th Berlin International Film Festival. He was also nominated for the Academy Award for Best Foreign Language Film. He collaborated with director and close friend Tomás Gutiérrez Alea and actors Jorge Perugorría, Vladimir Cruz and Mirta Ibarra in several films.

His 2000 film, The Waiting List (Lista de Espera), was screened in the Un Certain Regard section at the 2000 Cannes Film Festival.

== Biography ==
Juan Carlos Tabío was born in 1943 in Havana, Cuba. Although his illustrious filmmaking career spanned nearly three decades, his initial involvement in the genre came as an accident. When he was young, his parents prepared him for a career in politics. It was not until a family friend who worked for the national cinemagraphic society invited him to work on a film that Tabío gave filmmaking a thought as a career.

Juan Carlos Tabío began working in 1961 at the ICAIC (Cuban Institute of Art and Cinematographic Industry) as a production assistant and then later as an assistant director.

Between 1963 and 1980, he produced more than 30 documentaries. His first feature film (Se Swap) was released in 1983. Tabío taught screenwriting and filmmaking at the International School of Film and Television of San Antonio de los Baños between 1989 and 1990.

Tabío’s films are mostly comedies starring the people and places in Cuba. Using Cuba as an actor in and of itself allows him to both highlight the joys of the Cuban culture while also create a running social commentary on its flaws.

Juan Carlos Tabío was rewarded for his work on several occasions and received the Goya Awards including Best Foreign Language Film for Fresa y Chocolate (Strawberry and Chocolate).

In 2000 he directed The Waiting List, which tells the humorous story of a group of passengers waiting for a bus that will never appear. The use of humor and realistic dialogue takes the edge off of Tabío’s social commentary and illustration of the problems Cuba faces.

Juan Carlos Tabío demonstrated once again his penchant for the satirical comedy with the release of his latest feature film, The Cornucopia.

== Strawberry and Chocolate ==
The film Strawberry and Chocolate was a stand out film for both directors Juan Carlos Tabio and Tomás Gutiérrez Alea. This was one of the stand out films from both directors and won several international nominations and awards. This film was one of the first Cuban films to gain a lot of acknowledgement by the mainstream. It was nominated for an Academy Award under best foreign language film. This recognition really allowed Cuban cinema to get put on the map, and to be respected in the world of filmmaking.

This film garnered much of its attraction due to the topics and themes that this film covered. This film is rendered as a critique on Cuba and their revolutionary values. This gets challenged in the film by using subjects such as homosexuality to explore the idea of what it means to be a revolutionary in Cuba.

This film was made and produced during the Special Period. A time where Cuba's economy took a serious downfall due to the fall of the Soviet Union. This period of time in Cuba's history meant struck a downfall in the economy, labor, and also production of films. Production dropped significantly to around three feature length films per year. The only way possible to produce films was through the practice of co-productions. Strawberry and Chocolate fell into the category of co-produced films. Due to this the production budget of the film was very low. However, the biggest issue of production wasn't the lack of money, rather director Tomas Gutierrez Alea falling ill with cancer, and needing to undergo surgery. Due to this Juan Carlos Tabio was brought in to co direct the film.

== Films ==
- 1973 - Miriam Makeba, short
- 1974 - Chicho Ibáñez, documentary short
- 1974 - Soledad Bravo, documentary short
- 1975 - Sonia Silvestre, short
- 1984 - Se permuta
- 1986 - Dolly back, short
- 1987 - La entrevista, short
- 1988 - Demasiado miedo a la vida o Plaff
- 1993 - Strawberry and Chocolate (Fresa y Chocolate)
- 1994 - The Elephant and the Bicycle (El elefante y la bicicleta)
- 1995 - Guantanamera
- 1998 - Enredando sombras, documentary
- 1998 - Lorca en La Habana, TV short
- 2000 - The Waiting List (Lista de Espera)
- 2003 - Aunque estés lejos
- 2008 - Horn of Plenty (El cuerno de la abundancia)
- 2012 - 7 Days in Havana (7 días en La Habana)

== Bibliography ==
- Juan-Navarro, Santiago. “Brecht en La Habana: autorrefencialidad, desfamiliarización y cine dentro del cine en la obra de Juan Carlos Tabío”. Le cinéma cubain: identité et regards de l’intérieur. Ed. Sandra Hernández. Nantes: Centre de Recherche sur les Identités Nationales et l´Interculturalité - Université de Nantes, 2006. 125-135. Leer artículo
