= Cachito (film) =

- Theatrical release poster
- Directed by: Enrique Urbizu
- Screenplay by: Imanol Uribe; Francisco Pino; Jesús Regueira; Enrique Urbizu
- Based on: "Un asunto de honor" by Arturo Pérez Reverte
- Starring: Jorge Perugorría; Sancho Gracia; Amara Carmona; Elvira Mínguez; Aitor Mazo; Luis Cuenca; Pilar Bardem
- Cinematography: Alfredo Mayo
- Edited by: Pablo Blanco
- Music by: Bingen Mendizábal
- Production companies: Origen PC; Aurum Producciones
- Distributed by: Líder Films
- Release date: 8 March 1996
- Country: Spain
- Language: Spanish

Cachito is a 1996 Spanish road movie directed by Enrique Urbizu which stars Jorge Perugorría, Sancho Gracia, and Amara Carmona based on Arturo Pérez Reverte's story "Un asunto de honor".

== Plot ==
Set in southern Spain, the plot follows 16-year-old Toñi, who flees from a brothel with help from truck driver Manolo.

== Cast ==
- Jorge Perugorría as Manolo
- Sancho Gracia as Rafael
- Amara Carmona as Toñi
- Elvira Mínguez as Nati
- Aitor Mazo as Porky
- Luis Cuenca as Gentleman
- Pilar Bardem as Cousin
- Sara Mora as Aurora
- Lola Lemos as Grandmother
- Pepo Oliva as Lucas
- May Pascual as Amely
- Carmen de la Vega as Trujillo

== Production ==
The film is an Origen PC and Aurum Producciones production. Shooting locations included the Madrid region and Tarifa.

== Release ==
The film was released theatrically in Spain on 8 March 1996.

== Reception ==
Augusto Martínez Torres of El País found two flaws weighing down the film, namely an "excessive influence of the cartoon, with what this means of caricatured and simple" (with the film being a sort of Wile E. Coyote and the Road Runner vying for a Romani girl), and mainly "the lack of humanity and the excessive manichaeism of the characters".

== See also ==
- List of Spanish films of 1996
