= Wojciech Alaborski =

Polish actor (1941–2009)

Wojciech Alaborski (September 23, 1941 – April 5, 2009) was a Polish actor. He was born in Drohobycz and died in Warsaw.

== Selected filmography ==
- Pearl in the Crown (1972)
- Nights and Days (1975)
- Jaroslaw Dabrowski (1976)
- Camouflage (1977)
- Spiral (1978)
- Operation Arsenal (1978)
- Man of Iron (1981)
- Pan Tadeusz: The Last Foray in Lithuania (1999)
- Inferno Below (2003)
