= Horn of Plenty (film) =

- Directed by: Juan Carlos Tabío
- Screenplay by: Arturo Arango; Juan Carlos Tabío
- Story by: Arturo Arango
- Produced by: Mariela Besuivesky; Gerardo Herrero; Camilo Vives
- Starring: Jorge Perugorría; Enrique Molina
- Cinematography: Hans Burmann
- Edited by: Berta Frías
- Music by: Lucio Godoy
- Production companies: Tornasol Films; Cuban Institute of Cinematographic Art and Industry
- Release date: 5 September 2008 (TIFF)
- Running time: 1h 48min
- Countries: Cuba; Spain
- Language: Spanish
- Box office: $569,190

Horn of Plenty (Spanish: El cuerno de la abundancia) is a 2008 Cuban / Spanish comedy film directed by Juan Carlos Tabío.

== Cast ==
- Jorge Perugorría - Bernardito
- Enrique Molina - Bernardo
- Paula Alí - Asunción
- Yoima Valdés - Yurima
- Laura De la Uz - Zobeida
- Annia Bu Maure - Marthica
- Tahimi Alvariño - Nadia
- Vladimir Cruz - Jacinto
- Mirta Ibarra - Charo
