= Aleph Producciones =

Argentine film production company

Aleph Producciones S.A. is a film production company in Buenos Aires, Argentina.

== Filmography ==
- Adolescente, sucre d'amour (1985)
- Amico arabo, L' (1991)
- Un Muro de silencio (1993)
- Of Love and Shadows (1994)
- Amigomío (1994)
- Patrón (1995)
- Kanya Ya Ma Kan, Beyrouth (1995)
- Evita (1996)
- Un Asunto privado (1996)
- Dile a Laura que la quiero (1997)
- Sus ojos se cerraron y el mundo sigue andando (1998)
- Frontera Sur (1998)
- El evangelio de las maravillas (1998)
- Operación Fangio (1999)
- El Amateur (1999)
- Nueces para el amor (2000)
- El Despertar de L (2001)
- Sudeste (2001)
- El Séptimo arcángel (2003)
- Dolores de casada (2004)
- 18-j (2004)
- ...al fin, el mar (2005)
- La Manos (2006)
- Suspiros del corazón (2006)
