= The Man Who Loved Dogs =

2009 novel by Leonardo Padura Fuentes

Book cover, featuring photo of Trotsky.

The Man who Loved Dogs is a novel by Leonardo Padura and involves the complex political narratives that surround the assassination of Leon Trotsky by Ramon Mercader. The novel was a finalist for the Book of the Year Award in Spain. It was originally published in 2009 by Tusquets Editors, Spain. It has been translated into English by Anna Kushner. The English translation was published in the U.S. in 2014 by Farrar, Straus and Giroux. Padura’s novel traces the saga of Trotsky’s 11-year flight from Stalin; the recruitment and creation of an assassin in the form of Catalan communist Ramón Mercader; and the marginalization of Iván Cárdenas Maturell, a Cuban novelist who learns early in his career the hazards of writing in his homeland.

Stalin wanted a savage, “spectacular” killing, not just a simple poisoning like the one he ordered for Trotsky’s son. Trotsky had survived the attack in 1940 led by the muralist David Alfaro Siqueiros, but, on August 20, 1940, Mercader plunged an ice ax into the back of Trotsky’s head. In Cuba, Trotsky is officially vilified to this day for betraying the revolution.

== Genesis of the novel ==
Leonardo Padura, speaking in 2017; “I first visited Mexico as a journalist in the 1980s. I knew nothing at all about Trotsky but I visited the museum and saw the room where he was assassinated. It made a profound impression on me. I asked myself how was it possible for someone who played such a role in the Revolution and Civil War simply to cease to exist.

"I went to the library in Havana and found two books about Trotsky. One was called Trotsky the Renegade and the other was Trotsky the Traitor. These were the only official sources available in Cuba at that time. But then something extraordinary occurred. The Berlin Wall fell and after that a mass of material that had been hidden in the archives suddenly became available."

Leonardo then started to study the life of Trotsky and gradually the idea took shape in his mind of writing a novel. He went to Russia to investigate the archives, but was astonished to find that there was nothing at all about the assassination of Trotsky. It seems that Stalin followed the plans to assassinate his enemy in great detail and was given daily reports by his agents, but once he had read them, he burned them.

== Reception ==
'The Cuban writer Leonardo Padura has made his entrance to the Latin American Modernist canon by writing a Russian novel. The three alternating stories resonate with one another, acquiring deeper meaning as they paint the complete fresco of a political paradigm’s downfall.' Alvaro Enrigue, The New York Times.

'Padura has written a historical novel of Tolstoyan sweep. [It] is an exhaustively reported work, chockablock with history - from the Russian Revolution, the rise of Fascism and Stalin's show trials to the steely suffocation of post-Castro Cuba.' Ann Louise Bardach, The Washington Post.
