= Carmen Sánchez Lozano =

Spanish actress

- Sánchez (2024)
- Born: 19 May 2001 (age 25); Madrid, Spain
- Occupation: Actress
- Years active: 2008–present
- Notable work: El ministerio del tiempo as Isabella II; Isabel as Joanna la Beltraneja; El don de Alba as Alicia Ramos

Carmen Sánchez Lozano (born 19 May 2001) is a Spanish actress from Madrid.

== Biography ==
She began her career in the performing arts at the age of 7, and participating in television series such as Dos de Mayo, Fuera de lugar, Cazadores de hombres and Física y química. Despite her young age. She acting, dancing and singing talent opened the doors to several film projects.

In 2011, she became known to the Spanish public thanks to her role in the series Ángel o demonio. She became popular throughout Europe for her performance in the series Alatriste in 2015.

She also stood out in El Ministerio del Tiempo and Isabel, where she played Juana la Beltraneja in her childhood.

In 2012, she made her film debut in The Last Island directed by Dácil Pérez de Guzmán. At August same year, she received the award for Best Actress at the Feel Good Film Festival 2012 in Los Angeles.

In 2014 she won the award for Best Actress at the Festival Film Castilla-La Mancha for the short film, No hace falta que me lo digas. In 2018 she acted for the first time in a play, as the lead in the medium-length comedy Los influencers también lloran, directed by Víctor Santos.

In 2022 she joined the Netflix series Sky High: The Series, an adaptation from film of the same name, and directed by Daniel Calparsoro.

== Filmography ==
=== Film ===
Year	Title	Role	Notes
2010	The Veil	Sara	Short film
2010	Esperas		
2012	The Last Island	Alicia	
2012	No hace falta que me lo digas	Olivia	
2013	Método Inocente	Pedro Pérez Martí	Short film
2014	Les Yeux jaunes des crocodiles	Cloe	Dubbing
2014	Hago bien en recordar	César Roldán	
2020	Huidas y ausencias	Niña Psicóloga	

=== Television ===
Year	Title	Role	Notes	Ref(s)
2008	Dos de Mayo, Libertad de una nación	Vanesa Morales	6 Episode	
2008	Fuera de juego	Luna	8 Episode	
2008	Física o Química	Alba Madrona	3 Episode	
2008	Cazadores de hombres	Mireia Leal	1 Episode	
2009	Los misterios de Laura	Niña Álvarez	1 Episode	
2010	La duquesa	Cayetana Fitz-James	Television film	
2010	Acusados	Alba	11 Episode	
2010	El Internado	Vanesa Morales		
2011	Ángel o demonio	Duna	22 Episode	
2012	Isabel	Juana la Beltraneja	8 Episode	
2013	El don de Alba	Alicia	11 Episode	
2014	El Rey	Infanta Elena	1 Episode	
2015	Alatriste	Angélica de Alquezar	13 Episode	
2015	The Ministry of Time	Isabella II	1 Episode	
2023	Hasta el cielo: La serie	Marta	5 Episode	

== Awards ==
Year	Award	Category	Work(s)	Result	Ref.
2012	Feel Good Film Festival	Best Actress	The Last Island	Won	
