= The Good Demons =

Cuban drama film

- Spanish: Los buenos demonios
- Directed by: Gerardo Chijona
- Written by: Daniel Díaz Torres; Alejandro Hernández
- Produced by: Gerardo Chijona
- Starring: Carlos Enrique Almirante; Vladimir Cruz; Enrique Molina
- Cinematography: Raúl Pérez Ureta
- Edited by: Miriam Talavera
- Music by: Edesio Alejandro
- Release date: December 2017 (International Festival of New Latin American Cinema)
- Running time: 88 minutes
- Countries: Cuba, Spain
- Language: Spanish

The Good Demons (Spanish: Los buenos demonios) is a 2017 Cuban drama film directed by Gerardo Chijona. The screenplay, written by Daniel Díaz Torres, is based on the novel Algún demonio by Alejandro Hernández. It follows Tito, a 23 year old with a car and a secret. While his neighbors see him as a respectable, educated young man earning an income as a taxi driver, the reality is much more insidious. The film premiered at the 2017 International Festival of New Latin American Cinema in Havana.

== Cast ==
- Carlos Enrique Almirante as Tito
- Vladimir Cruz as Rubén
- Enrique Molina as Molina
- Isabel Santos as Paquita
- Yailene Sierra as Sara

== Awards ==
At the 2018 Málaga Film Festival the film won awards for Best Supporting Actor, Best Screenplay, and Best Music, and was nominated for Best Iberoamerican Film.
