= Life Marks =

2003 film

- Theatrical release poster
- Spanish: La vida mancha
- Directed by: Enrique Urbizu
- Written by: Enrique Urbizu; Michel Gaztambide
- Produced by: Gerardo Herrero; Fernando Victoria de Lecea
- Starring: José Coronado; Juan Sanz; Zay Nuba
- Cinematography: Carles Gusi
- Music by: Mario de Benito
- Production companies: Tornasol Films; Iberrota Films
- Distributed by: Alta Films
- Release date: 9 May 2003 (Spain)
- Running time: 107 min
- Country: Spain
- Language: Spanish

Life Marks (Spanish: La vida mancha) is a 2003 Spanish drama film directed by Enrique Urbizu, who has also written the screenplay along with Michel Gaztambide, and starring José Coronado, Juan Sanz and Zay Nuba.

== Plot ==
Fito and his wife Juana live in the suburbs of Madrid. He drives a truck for a living and has a gambling problem. Daily, he loses money playing poker. One day, his older brother, Pedro who had spent his last years living in London comes back to his homeland and visits Fito's family. This visit will change the life of every member of the family.

== Cast ==
- José Coronado as Pedro
- Zay Nuba as Juana
- Juan Sanz as Fito
- Sandro Polo as Jon
- Yohana Cobo as Sara
- Silvia Espigado as Charo
- Alfonso Torregrosa as Larrea
- Enrique Martínez as Visitador
- Gabriel Moreno as Camarero
- May Pascual as Camarera
- Cesáreo Estébanez as Estrada

== Production ==
The film was produced by Tornasol Films and Iberrota Films with the participation of TVE, Vía Digital and EITB. Footage was shot in Madrid, specifically in the districts of Fuencarral-El Pardo and Barajas.

== Release ==
Distributed by Alta Films, the film was theatrically released on 9 May 2003.

== Reception ==
Reviewing for Fotogramas, Fernando Méndez-Leite rated the film with 4 out of 5 stars, considering it a "strange and evocative approach to an intimate story", highlighting the "elegant" mise-en-scène by Urbizu, the boldness of the proposal and Coronado's performance to be the best about the film.

Jonathan Holland of Variety deemed it to be a "delicately impressive, offbeat drama", writing about the "commanding, impassive presence" of Coronado's performance, contrasting with the exuding "freshness and enthusiasm" by Sanz and Nuba.

== See also ==
- List of Spanish films of 2003
