= The Amateur (1999 film) =

El Amateur
- DVD Cover
- Directed by: Juan Bautista Stagnaro
- Written by: Juan Bautista Stagnaro; Mauricio Dayub
- Produced by: Juan Bautista Stagnaro
- Starring: Mauricio Dayub; Vando Villamil
- Cinematography: Víctor González
- Edited by: Miguel Pérez
- Music by: Jaime Roos
- Distributed by: Aleph Producciones S.A.
- Release date: April 22, 1999
- Running time: 88 minute
- Country: Argentina
- Language: Spanish

The Amateur (Spanish: El Amateur) is an Argentine film directed by Juan Bautista Stagnaro and shot in color. It is based on Stagnaro's own screenplay, which was adapted from the play of the same name by Mauricio Dayub. The film was theatrically released in Argentina on April 22, 1999, and features Mauricio Dayub, Vando Villamil, Juan Verdaguer, and Cacho Espíndola in starring roles. Some of the scenes were filmed in the city of Chascomús, Buenos Aires Province. The picture was nominated for five Silver Condor Awards. It is Juan Verdaguer's final film.

== Synopsis ==
The film tells the tale of Pájaro, an unemployed man, and Lopecito, a factory worker, as they embark on an extraordinary mission to shatter the record for the longest duration spent cycling. Set on the fringes of a provincial town, Pájaro becomes resolute in his quest to secure a coveted spot in the esteemed Guinness Book of Records, pushing the limits of endurance atop his trusty bicycle. Assisted by his loyal companion, Lopecito, Pájaro tirelessly pedals around the fountain in the town square, bravely confronting numerous obstacles that stand in his way. Through this audacious endeavor, will pájaro find not only triumph in breaking a world record but also the unexpected blossoming of love and personal redemption?

== Cast ==
- Mauricio Dayub as Alfonso "Pájaro" Romero
- Pedro Heredia as Ramón
- Vando Villamil as Lopecito
- Arturo Goetz as Concejal
- Cacho Espíndola as Intendente
- Alejandra Puy as La Mora
- Darío Grandinetti as Funcionario municipal

== Exhibition ==
The film premiered on April 22, 1999 and was released in Canada at the Montreal World Film Festival and in America in Miami at the Hispanic Film Festival.

The film was produced by Aleph Producciones S.A. and distributed by Transeuropa Video Entertainment on VHS.

== See also ==
- List of films about bicycles and cycling
