= Los Justicieros (video game) =

1996 video game

- Box art
- Developer(s): Dinamic Multimedia
- Release: 1996
- Genre(s): Interactive film

Los Justicieros (transl. The Vigilantes) is a Western interactive film released by Spanish company Dinamic Multimedia in 1996 for PC. Excluding additional minigames, it is a port of the arcade game of the same name (known outside Spain as Zorton Brothers) released in 1992. The scenes, shot in the same places as the dueling scenes in the Dollars Trilogy, were directed by Enrique Urbizu.

== Gameplay ==
The gameplay consists of pointing and clicking to shoot at hoodlums in the Wild West.

== Reception ==
In 2016, the video game was included in HobbyConsolas' "greatest Western video games."
