= Leonardo Padura Fuentes =

Cuban novelist and journalist (born 1955)

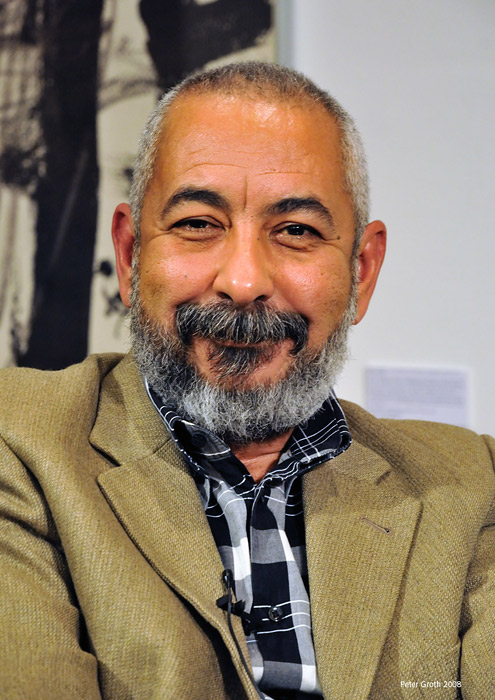
- Born: Leonardo de la Caridad Padura Fuentes; 10 October 1955 (age 71); Havana, Cuba
- Citizenship: Cuban (birthplace); Spanish (naturalized)
- Education: University of Havana
- Occupations: Novelist, journalist
- Writing career
- Language: Spanish
- Period: 1983–present
- Genres: Crime fiction, journalism
- Notable works: Fiebre de caballos; Adiós, Hemingway; El hombre que amaba a los perros (The Man Who Loved Dogs)

Leonardo de la Caridad Padura Fuentes (born October 10, 1955) is a Cuban novelist and journalist best known for his Mario Conde detective novels and for El hombre que amaba a los perros (2009). In 2012, Padura was awarded the National Prize for Literature, Cuba's national literary award. In 2015, he was awarded the Premio Principe de Asturias de las Letras of Spain.

== Life and career ==
Padura was born in Havana, Cuba on October 10th, 1955. He received a degree in Latin American literature at the University of Havana. He first came to prominence in 1980 as an investigative journalist for the literary magazine Caimán Barbudo. He became known as an essayist, screenwriter, and a novelist.

He wrote his first novel between 1983 and 1984, a love story titled Fiebre de caballos ("Horse Fever").

=== Mario Conde books ===
Padura is best known in the English-speaking world for his quartet of detective novels featuring lieutenant Mario Conde. Collectively titled Las cuatro estaciones (The four seasons), they are sometimes called The Havana Quartet in their English translations. Conde is a cop who would rather be a writer, and admits to feelings of "solidarity with writers, crazy people, and drunkards". These books are set respectively in winter, spring, summer and autumn (Vientos de cuaresma literally means "Lenten Winds" and Paisaje de otoño, "Autumn landscape"):

- Pasado perfecto (1991, translated as Havana Blue, 2007)
- Vientos de cuaresma (1994, translated as Havana Gold, 2008)
- Máscaras (1997, translated as Havana Red, 2005)
- Paisaje de otoño (1998, translated as Havana Black, 2006)

Padura has published five subsequent books featuring Conde, the novella Adiós Hemingway, La neblina del ayer (The Fog of Yesterday, published in English as Havana Fever)., La Cola de la Serpiente (Grab a Snake by the Tail), Herejes (Heretics) and La Transparencia del Tiempo (The Transparency of Time). Adiós Hemingway was Padura's first book to be translated into English, in 2005. The Havana-Cultura website comments on the similarities and differences between Padura and Hemingway, and how they might explain Padura's decision to feature the expatriate American in Adiós Hemingway.

Paisaje de otoño won the 1998 Premio Hammett of the Asociación Internacional de Escritores Policíacos (International Association of Crime Writers).

The four books were adapted as four Spanish-language television films, which have been released in a group with English subtitles as the Netflix mini-series Four Seasons in Havana. They star Cuban actor Jorge Perugorría and were produced by Tornasol Film. An English-language remake named Havana Quartet was considered by Starz, with Antonio Banderas tagged to act as Conde, but it did not proceed beyond the development stage. In 2014, BBC Radio broadcast dramatizations of the four stories starring Zubin Varla.

=== Other works ===
Padura's historical novel El hombre que amaba a los perros (The Man Who Loved Dogs) deals with the 1940 death of exile and Russian revolutionary Leon Trotsky, and the NKVD agent responsible for eliminating him, Ramon Mercader. At almost 600 pages, it is perhaps Padura's most ambitious and accomplished work and the result of more than five years of meticulous historical research. The novel, published in September 2009, attracted publicity mainly because of its political theme. It centres "on Stalin’s murderous obsession with Leon Trotsky, an intellectual architect of the Russian Revolution and the founder of the Red Army", and considers "how revolutionary utopias devolve into totalitarian dystopias."

Padura's books have been translated into French, Italian, Portuguese, German, Greek, and Danish. In 2013, France named him a Chevalier of the Ordre des Arts et des Lettres.

Padura still lives and writes in his native city of Havana.

"In one of his essays entitled 'I would like to be Paul Auster,' Padura complains that he would love not to be constantly asked about politics in his country and why he continues living there. But this is very much his niche: he is widely seen as the best writer in Cuba, a country whose best writers were all formed before Castro rule. He offers us an off-the-beaten-path visit of a relatively closed society, a prose that is free of propaganda (though not liberated from surveillance). By occupying a small but significant critical space in Cuba, Padura becomes more interesting for Cuba observers and more intriguing for students of cultural and literary trends in the island."

Latest book

Leonardo Padura’s latest book is Morir en la Arena (Dying in the Sand), published in 2025. According to a recent review, Padura himself regards this as his saddest novel, which centers on a parricide inspired by real events and explores the challenges of contemporary Cuba.

In an interview on the occasion of the publication of this novel, Padura stated:

"I wanted to write a novel that spoke about the unfortunate, painful fate of a generation, my generation, the generation that grew up and lived through the entire revolutionary process, that worked, sacrificed, obeyed, believed, and that at the end of its life finds itself living in poverty."

== Seleted bibliography ==
=== Novels ===
- Fiebre de caballos, 1988.
- Pasado perfecto, 1991 ("Havana Blue", 2007).
- Vientos de cuaresma, 1994 ("Havana Gold", 2008).
- Máscaras, 1997 ("Havana Red", 2005).
- Paisaje de otoño, 1998 ("Havana Black", 2006).
- Adiós Hemingway, 2001.
- La novela de mi vida, 2002.
- La neblina del ayer, 2005 ("Havana Fever", 2009).
- El hombre que amaba a los perros, 2009 (The Man Who Loved Dogs, 2014).
- La cola de la serpiente, 2011.
- Herejes, 2013 ("Heretics", 2017).
- Regreso a Ítaca (Return to Itaca, 2016)
- La transparencia del tiempo, 2018.
- Como polvo en el viento ("Like Dust in the Wind", 2020)
- Personas decentes, 2022.
- Ir a la Habana, Tusquets, 2024.
- Morir en la arena, Tusquets, 2025.

=== Nonfiction and essays ===
- Con la espada y con la pluma: comentarios al Inca Garcilaso de la Vega, Letras Cubanas,1984.
- Colón, Carpentier, la mano, el arpa y la sombra, Departamento de Actividades Culturales, Universidad de La Habana, 1987.
- Lo real maravilloso, creación y realidad, Letras Cubanas, 1989.
- Estrellas del béisbol. El alma en el terreno, Editora Abril, 1989.
- El viaje más largo, Ediciones Unión, 1994.
- Un camino de medio siglo: Alejo Carpentier y la narrativa de lo real maravilloso, Letras Cubanas, 1994.
- Los rostros de la salsa, Ediciones Unión, 1997.
- Modernidad, posmodernidad y novela policial, Ediciones Unión, 2000.
- La cultura y la Revolución cubana, Editorial Plaza Mayor, 2002.
- José María Heredia: la patria y la vida, Ediciones Unión, 2003.
- Entre dos siglos, ensayo, IPS, 2006.
- La memoria y el olvido, ensayos y artículos, IPS, 2011.
- Yo quisiera ser Paul Auster. Ensayos selectos, Editorial Verbum, 2015.
- Agua por todas partes, Tusquets, 2019.

=== Short stories ===
- Según pasan los años, Letras Cubanas, 1989.
- El cazador, Ediciones Unión, La Habana, 1991.
- La puerta de Alcalá y otras cacerías, cuentos, Olalla Ediciones, 1998.
- El submarino amarillo, Ediciones Coyoacán: Coordinación de Difusión Cultural, Dirección de Literatura/UNAM, 1993.
- Nueve noches con Amada Luna, Colección Mini Letras, 2006.
- Mirando al sol, Sarita Cartonera, 2009.
- Aquello estaba deseando ocurrir, Tusquets, 2015.

=== Screenwriting ===
- Yo soy del son a la salsa, (1996).
- Malabana, (2001).
- Siete días en La Habana, (2011).
- Regreso a Ítaca, (2014).
- Cuatro estaciones en La Habana, (2016).

=== Critical studies and reviews of Padura's work ===
- Anderson, Jon Lee (October 21, 2013). "Private eyes : a crime novelist navigates Cuba's shifting reality". Letter from Havana. The New Yorker. Vol. 89, no. 33. pp. 60–71.
- "How to Write from Mantilla, or the Small Heresies of Leonardo Padura," chapter 5 in Yvon Grenier, Culture and the Cuban State, Participation, Recognition, and Dissonance under Communism (Lexington Books, 2017).
