= Alicia Agut =

Spanish actress

- Died: 7 April 2017 (aged 87)
- Occupation: Actress

Alicia Agut (7 September 1929 – 7 April 2017) was a Spanish actress.

== Biography ==
In 1950, Agut began to work mainly in the theater and appear in films and television in the 1960s. She is known for her performance in the cinema such as Amantes, La flor de mi Secreto and El animated forest. Agut became popular in series such as Hospital Central (2000) and Pelotas (2009).

Agut died on 7 April 2017, in Madrid, at the age of 87 due to respiratory complications.

== Filmography ==
=== Theater ===
- 1950: La vida es sueño by Pedro Calderón de la Barca
- 1953: El Jardín de Falerina
- 1954: Julieta o la clave de los sueños
- 1957: Los Triunfos Del Amor
- 1961: Misterio En El Círculo Rojo De Antonio Samons
- 1963: La Alegría De Vivir

=== Cinema ===
- Death Penalty
- The Animated Forest
- El Lute
- Lovers
- The Flower Of My Secret
- Tierra

=== Television ===
- Ficciones
- Lecciones De Tocador
- La Forja De Un Rebelde
- Anillos De Oro
- Manolito Gafotas
- El Comisario
- Hospital Central
- Pelotas
