= Miguel Barroso Ayats =

Spanish journalist and politician (1953–2024)

Secretary of State for Press
- In office 18 April 2004 – 30 September 2005
- Preceded by: Alfredo Timermans
- Succeeded by: Fernando Moraleda Quílez

Personal details
- Born: 21 October 1953 Zaragoza, Spain
- Died: 13 January 2024 (aged 70) Madrid, Spain
- Party: OCE-BR
- Education: University of Barcelona
- Occupation: Journalist

Miguel Barroso Ayats (21 October 1953 – 13 January 2024) was a Spanish journalist and politician. A member of the dissolved Communist Organization of Spain, Barroso served as Secretary of State for Press from 2004 to 2005.

Barroso died of a heart attack in Madrid on 13 January 2024, at the age of 70. Between 2007 and 2016 he was married to politician Carme Chacón, with whom he had a son.
