= Taravilla =

Municipality in Castile-La Mancha, Spain

Taravilla, Spain
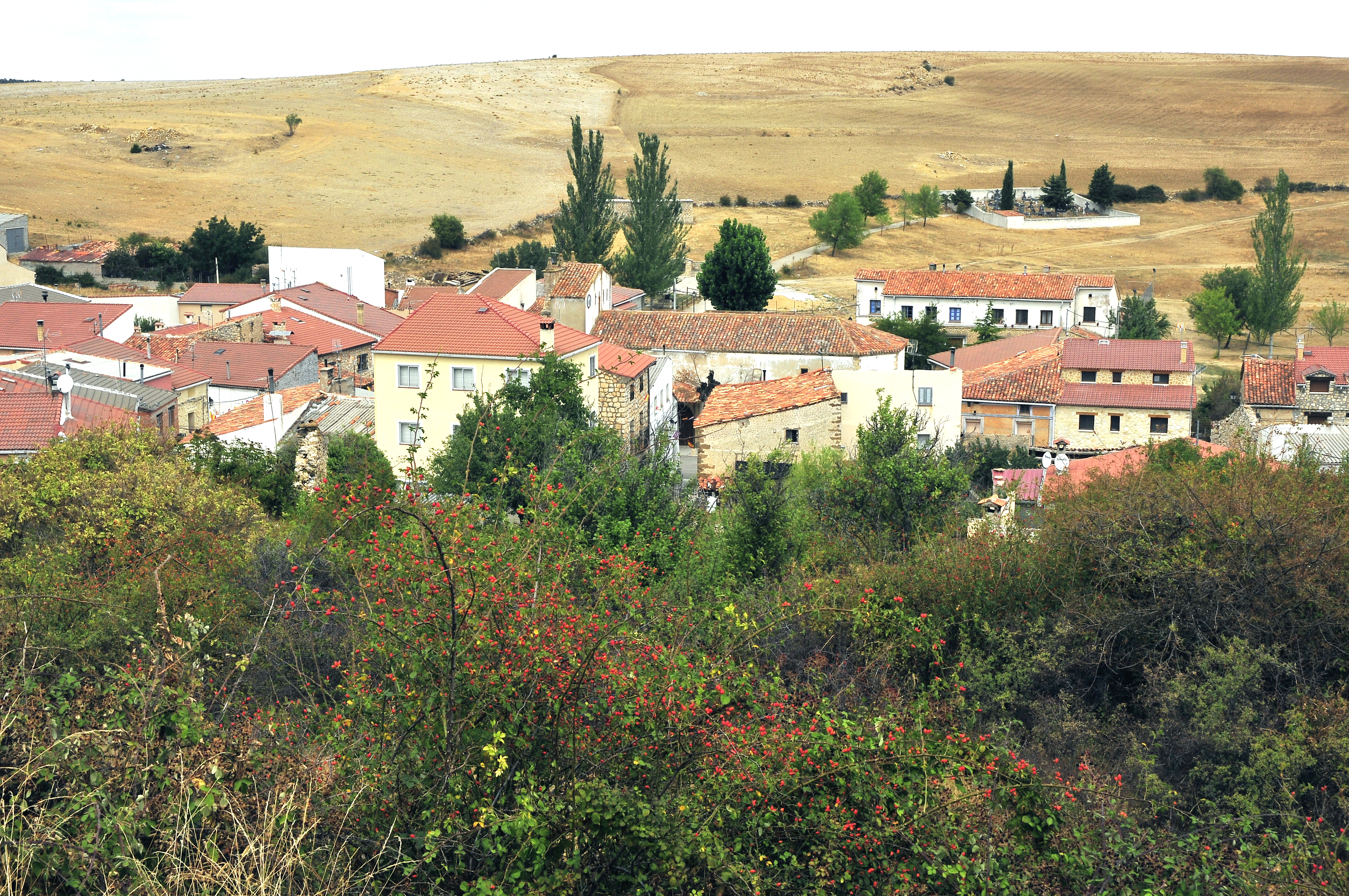

- Location within Province of Guadalajara Location within Castilla-La Mancha Location within Spain
- Coordinates: 40°41′54″N 1°58′03″W
- Country: Spain
- Autonomous community: Castile-La Mancha
- Province: Guadalajara
- Municipality: Taravilla

Area
  - Total: 60.68 km^{2} (23.43 sq mi)
- Elevation: 1,325 m (4,347 ft)

Population (2025-01-01)
  - Total: 38
  - Density: 0.63/km^{2} (1.6/sq mi)
- Time zone: UTC+1 (CET)
  - Summer (DST): UTC+2 (CEST)

Taravilla is a municipality located in the province of Guadalajara, Castile-La Mancha, Spain. According to the 2004 census (INE), the municipality had a population of 65 inhabitants.
