= Gigantes (TV series) =

TV series

- Genre: Crime drama; Thriller
- Created by: Miguel Barros; Michel Gaztambide; Enrique Urbizu
- Written by: Miguel Barros; Miguel Gaztambide
- Directed by: Enrique Urbizu; Jorge Dorado
- Starring: Daniel Grao; Isak Férriz; Carlos Librado; Yolanda Torosio; Elisabet Gelabert; Sofía Oria; Juana Acosta; Xenia Tostado; Ariana Martínez; Óscar Higares
- Country of origin: Spain
- Original language: Spanish
- No. of seasons: 2
- No. of episodes: 12

Production
- Production company: Movistar+

Original release
- Network: Movistar+
- Release: 5 October 2018 – 22 March 2019

Gigantes is a Spanish crime drama television series. Created by Miguel Barros, Michel Gaztambide and Enrique Urbizu for Movistar+ based on the original idea by Manuel Gancedo and starring Isak Férriz, Daniel Grao and Carlos Librado, the fiction follows the history of the Guerrero, a family based in Lavapiés controlling an extensive criminal network. The two seasons of the series aired in October 2018 and March 2019, respectively. It has been described as a "story about moral corruption, the dissolution of the family and the extinction of masculinity".

== Premise ==
The fiction follows the Guerrero, a family based in Lavapiés controlling an extensive criminal network, using the furniture trade as cover. The patriarch of the family, the widowed Abraham Guerrero, built a criminal empire in El Rastro. The three sons of Abraham, Daniel, Tomás, and Clemente have received a backward and toxic upbringing, heirs to a crumbling male-dominant world eating itself up. The three brothers struggle for control of the criminal business.

The bulk of the story has Madrid as background.

== Cast ==
- Isak Férriz as Daniel Guerrero.
- Daniel Grao as Tomás Guerrero.
- Carlos Librado, "Nene" as Clemente Guerrero.
- Elisabet Gelabert as Ángela Márquez.
- Yolanda Torosio as Sol.
- Sofía Oria as Carmen.
- Xenia Tostado as Bárbara.
- Ariana Martínez as Lorena.
- Juana Acosta as Lucía.
- Roberto Enríquez as Ortiz.
- José Coronado as Abraham Guerrero.
- Óscar Higares as Caracaballo

== Production and release ==
The series was created by Miguel Barros, Michel Gaztambide and Enrique Urbizu, based on the original idea by Manuel Gancedo. The episodes were directed by Enrique Urbizu and Jorge Dorado. The former sausage factory of La Choricera and the Museo Esteban Vicente in Segovia were repurposed as set for some scenes of the first season. The first season consisted of 6 episodes with a running time ranging from to 47 to 58 minutes. It was released on 5 October 2018 on Movistar+.

The filming of the second season took 18 months, shooting in locations of Madrid other than the centre (Moncloa, Chamartín, Herrera Oria, Vallecas), the Madrid region (El Escorial, Villanueva del Pardillo) as well as Portugal (Porto).

The second season, also comprising 6 episodes, was released on 22 March 2019.

Series	Episodes	Originally released	Network	Ref.
1	6	5 October 2018	Movistar+	
2	6	22 March 2019	Movistar+	

No. overall	No. in season	Title	Directed by	Original release date
1	1	"Devastación"	Enrique Urbizu	5 October 2018
2	2	"Familia"	Enrique Urbizu	5 October 2018
3	3	"Confluencias"	Enrique Urbizu	5 October 2018
4	4	"Cicatrices"	Jorge Dorado	5 October 2018
5	5	"Pérdida"	Jorge Dorado	5 October 2018
6	6	"Paraíso"	Jorge Dorado	5 October 2018

No. overall	No. in season	Title	Directed by	Original release date
7	1	"Purgatorio"	Enrique Urbizu	22 March 2019
8	2	"Infierno"	Enrique Urbizu	22 March 2019
9	3	"Escorpión"	Enrique Urbizu	22 March 2019
10	4	"Paula"	Enrique Urbizu	22 March 2019
11	5	"Mar eterno"	Enrique Urbizu	22 March 2019
12	6	"Akelarre"	Enrique Urbizu	22 March 2019

== Awards and nominations ==
Year	Award	Category	Nominee(s)	Result	Ref.
2019	6th Feroz Awards	Best Drama Series		Nominated	
2019	21st Iris Awards	Best Actor	Isak Férriz	Nominated	
2019	7th MiM Series Awards	Best Direction	Enrique Urbizu & Jorge Dorado	Won	
2019	7th MiM Series Awards	Best Screenplay	Miguel Barros & Miguel Gaztambide	Nominated	
2019	7th MiM Series Awards	Best Drama Actor	Isak Férriz	Nominated	
2019	7th MiM Series Awards	Best Drama Series		Nominated	
