= Tom Abrams =

American screenwriter and director

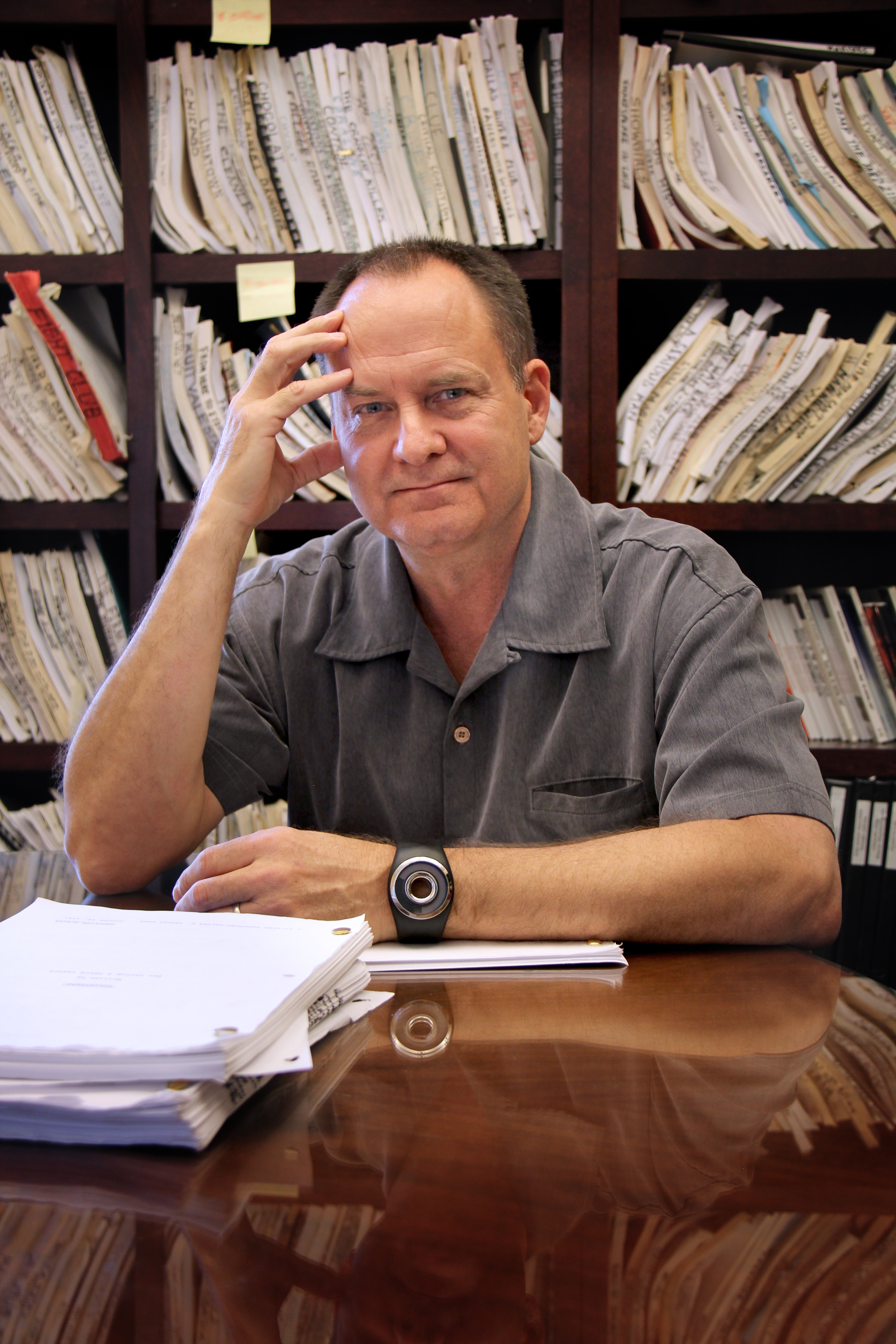
- at University of Southern California, 2015
- Born: North Carolina, United States
- Occupation(s): Screenwriter, Professor

Tom Abrams (North Carolina, 1958) is an American screenwriter and director whose work has been recognized in both the United States and Europe.

== Early life and education ==
Abrams was born and raised in North Carolina. His father was Richard Abrams, a Chief Master Sergeant in the US Air Force, who did three tours of duty in Vietnam and received the Bronze Star. His mother Pegge Abrams, was a Civil Rights activist and Director of the Language Laboratory at Duke University.

Abrams grew up in Durham where he starred in stage plays at Northern High School and the Duke University Summer Theater, including productions of Flowers for Algernon, One Flew Over The Cuckoo's Nest, The Lion in Winter, Dirty Linen and the New-Found-Land, and The Hound of the Baskervilles.

He continued his education at Guilford College in Greensboro, where he received a B.A. in Drama and studied abroad in London and Munich. At Guilford, Abrams acted in and directed a number of plays, including Tartuffe, Look Homeward Angel, Endgame, The Taming of the Shrew, No Exit, and Six Characters in Search of an Author.

After completing his undergraduate degree Abrams studied theater in the Masters program at Northwestern University where he starred in productions of The Wakefield Mystery Cycle and Rosencrantz & Guildenstern Are Dead. Abrams completed his education at the Columbia University Film Division where he received an M.F.A. in Screenwriting and Directing, and was mentored by Frank Daniel, Miloš Forman, Annette Insdorf and Brad Dourif.

== Professional career ==
Abrams' screenwriting and directing career began when his short film Shoeshine (1988), starring Jerry and Ben Stiller, was nominated for an Academy Award and won Best Short Film at the Montreal World Film Festival. The following year, his short film Performance Pieces (1989), starring F. Murray Abraham, won the Prix du Court Metrage at the Cannes Film Festival.

Primarily a screenwriter, Abrams shared an Emmy Award with the writing staff of the animated series Rugrats, and his feature film work has won prizes at the Berlin, Malaga and Karlovy Vary film festivals.

Abrams has sold numerous feature film screenplays in varied genres including western Have Gun Will Travel for Warner Bros., historic adventure The Captain's Wife for Fox 2000, The American Princess for New Line Cinema, The Battle of Ono for John Woo and Terence Cheng, horror Cave for Working Title, sci-fi action Metal Machine for producer James Jacks at Universal, kids action comedy Gameboy Charlie for Bruckheimer producer Chad Oman, and action film Smokin' Aces 2: Assassins' Ball (2011) for Universal Pictures, among others. In 2013, Tom's work on Janos Szasz's film Le Grand Cahier resulted in the Jury Award at Karlovy Vary and was Hungary's entry for the Academy Award. In 2017, Tom co-wrote and executive produced Dennis Bartok's Irish horror film Nails. Abrams often writes with partners, most frequently Bartok and P.J. Pesce.

== Academic career ==
Abrams first taught film history at the College of Staten Island, then later history and aesthetics at Columbia University. He has conducted more than 80 screenwriting seminars worldwide and has worked in Europe for the last 25 years. Since 2006, he has been the Co-Head of Studies for ScripTeast, a Media-funded development workshop for Central and Eastern European films with more than 30 produced films to their credit. He is currently a tenured professor at the USC School of Cinematic Arts in Los Angeles where he teaches screenwriting.
