= Un Amor de Película =

- Developed by: Telemundo Studios, Miami
- Country of origin: United States
- Original language: Spanish

Production
- Executive producer: Aurelio Valcárcel Carroll
- Production location: Miami
- Camera setup: Multi-camera
- Running time: 42-44 minutes

Original release
- Network: Telemundo

Un Amor de Película (Love Just Like in the Movies) is a Spanish-language telenovela to be produced by United States-based television network Telemundo Studios, Miami.

Telemundo will air the serial from Monday to Friday during the 2011-2012 season. As with most of its other telenovelas, the network broadcasts English subtitles as closed captions on CC3.
