= Senel Paz =

Cuban author and screenwriter (born 1950)

Senel Paz (born 1950) is a Cuban author and screenwriter.

He was born in Fomento. He is best known for his short story The Wolf, the Forest and the New Man, for which he was awarded the Juan Rulfo Prize and which he subsequently adapted into the screenplay for Tomás Gutiérrez Alea's celebrated movie Strawberry and Chocolate (1994).
