= Enrique Urbizu =

Spanish film director and screenwriter (born 1962)

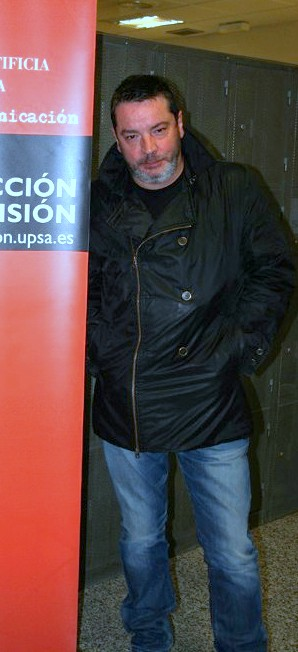
Enrique Urbizu in 2011

Enrique Urbizu (born 1962) is a Spanish film director and screenwriter. A native of Bilbao, he was one of the few Spanish film directors who brought the film noir into the late Spanish film industry.

Urbizu graduated from Universidad del País Vasco, where he did media studies.

In 2011, he won the Goya Award for Best Director with the movie No Rest for the Wicked.

== Filmography ==
Films

- Tu novia está loca (1988)
- Todo por la pasta (1991)
- Como ser infeliz y disfrutarlo (1994)
- Cachito (1995)
- Cuernos de mujer (1995)
- The Ninth Gate (1999, script only)
- La caja 507 (2002)
- La vida mancha (2003)
- Adivina quién soy (2006)
- No habrá paz para los malvados (2011)
- Herederos de la bestia (2016)

Television

- Las aventuras del Capitán Alatriste (TV series) (2015; co-director)
- Gigantes (TV Series) (2018–2019; co-director)
- Libertad (TV Series) (2021; director)

Screenplay

- Paper Castles (2009)

Video games

- Los Justicieros (1992)
