= 19th Goya Awards =

- Date: 30 January 2005
- Site: Palacio Municipal de Congresos de Madrid
- Hosted by: Antonio Resines, Maribel Verdú and Montserrat Caballé

Highlights
- Best Film: The Sea Inside
- Best Actor: Javier Bardem; The Sea Inside
- Best Actress: Lola Dueñas; The Sea Inside
- Most awards: The Sea Inside (14)
- Most nominations: The Sea Inside (15)

Television coverage
- Network: TVE
- Viewership: 3.7 million (24.5%)

The 19th Goya Awards took place in at the Palacio Municipal de Congresos in Madrid 30 January 2005. The gala was hosted by Maribel Verdú, Montserrat Caballé, and Antonio Resines.

The Sea Inside swept the awards with 14 wins including the four regular acting awards (Bardem, Bugallo, Dueñas and Rivera) and the two acting awards for Best New Actor and Actress, Best Director (Amenábar), Best Film and Best Original Screenplay (Amenábar and Gil). José Luis López Vázquez was the recipient of the Honorary Goya Award.

== Winners and nominees ==
The winners and nominees are listed as follows:

| Best Film: The Sea Inside; Rome; Tiovivo c. 1950; Bad Education | Best Director: Alejandro Amenábar – The Sea Inside; Carlos Saura – The 7th Day; Pedro Almodóvar – Bad Education; Adolfo Aristarain – Rome |
| Best Actor: Javier Bardem – The Sea Inside; Eduard Fernández – Things That Make Living Worthwhile; Guillermo Toledo – Ferpect Crime; Eduardo Noriega – The Wolf | Best Actress: Lola Dueñas – The Sea Inside; Ana Belén – Things That Make Living Worthwhile; Penélope Cruz – Don't Move; Pilar Bardem – Dearest Maria |
| Best Supporting Actor: Celso Bugallo – The Sea Inside; Luis Varela – Ferpect Crime; Juan Diego – The 7th Day; Unax Ugalde – Héctor | Best Supporting Actress: Mabel Rivera – The Sea Inside; Mercedes Sampietro – Unconscious; Silvia Abascal – The Wolf; Victoria Abril – The 7th Day |
| Best Original Screenplay: Alejandro Amenábar, Mateo Gil – The Sea Inside; Dominic Harari, Joaquín Oristrell, Teresa Pelegri – Unconscious; Adolfo Aristarain, Mario Camus, Kathy Saavedra – Rome; José Ángel Esteban, Carlos López, Manolo Matji – Hours of Light | Best Adapted Screenplay: José Rivera – The Motorcycle Diaries; Jaime Chávarri, Eduardo Mendoza – The Year of the Flood; Sergio Castellitto, Margaret Mazzantini – Don't Move; Salvador García Ruiz – Voices in the Night |
| Best New Actor: Tamar Novas – The Sea Inside; Jorge Roelas – Tiovivo c. 1950; Nilo Mur – Héctor; José Luis García Pérez – Bear Cub | Best New Actress: Belén Rueda – The Sea Inside; Mónica Cervera – Ferpect Crime; Núria Gago – Héctor; Teresa Hurtado de Ory – Astronauts |
| Best Spanish Language Foreign Film: Whisky · Uruguay; El Rey · Colombia; Moon of Avellaneda · Argentina; Machuca · Chile | Best European Film: Head-On · Germany; Being Julia · United Kingdom/Hungary; Monsieur Ibrahim · France; Girl with a Pearl Earring · United Kingdom |
| Best New Director: Pablo Malo – Cold Winter Sun; Ramón de España – Kill Me Tender; Santi Amodeo – Astronauts; Vicente Peñarrocha – Body Confusion | Best Animated Film: Pinocchio 3000; Los balunis en la aventura del fin del mundo; Supertramps |
| Best Cinematography: Javier Aguirresarobe – The Sea Inside; José Luis Alcaine – Rome; Raúl Pérez Cubero – Tiovivo c. 1950; Javier G. Salmones – Romasanta | Best Editing: Guillermo S. Maldonado – The Wolf; Iván Aledo – Swindled; Antonio Pérez Reina – Cold Winter Sun; José María Biurrún – Hours of Light |
| Best Art Direction: Gil Parrondo – Tiovivo c. 1950; Antxón Gómez – Bad Education; Benjamín Fernández – The Sea Inside; Rafael Palmero – The 7th Day | Best Production Supervision: Emiliano Otegui – The Sea Inside; Miguel Torrente, Cristina Zumárraga – The Wolf; Juanma Pagazaurtundua – Ferpect Crime; Esther García Rodríguez – Bad Education |
| Best Sound: Alfonso Raposo, Juan Ferro, María Sternberg, Ricardo Steinberg – The Sea Inside; Pierre Lorrain, Jaime Fernández, Polo Aledo – Swindled; Sergio Burmann, Jaime Fernández, Charly Schmukler – Ferpect Crime; Antonio Rodríguez Mármol, Patrick Ghislain, Nacho Royo-Villanova – Isi-Disi, Rough Love | Best Special Effects: Reyes Abades, Jesús Pascual, Ramón Lorenzo – The Wolf; Juan Ramón Molina, Félix Bergés – Ferpect Crime; Juan Ramón Molina, David Martí, Montse Ribé, José Quetglas, José María Aragonés – Romasanta; Juan Ramón Molina, Aurelio Sánchez-Herrera, Eduardo Acosta – Torapia |
| Best Costume Design: Yvonne Blake – The Bridge of San Luis Rey; Sonia Grande – The Whore and the Whale; Lourdes de Orduña – Tiovivo c. 1950; Sabine Daigeler – Unconscious | Best Makeup and Hairstyles: Ana López-Puigcerver, Jo Allen, Manolo García, Mara Collazo – The Sea Inside; Karmele Soler – Unconscious; Paca Almenara, Alicia López – Tiovivo c. 1950; Susana Sánchez, Patricia Rodríguez – Only Human |
| Best Original Score: Alejandro Amenábar – The Sea Inside; Sergio Moure – Unconscious; Ángel Illarramendi – Héctor; Roque Baños – The Machinist | Best Original Song: "Zambie Mameto" by Carlinhos Brown and Mateus – El milagro de Candeal; "Corre" by Bebe – Swindled; "La Rubia de la Cuarta Fila" by Joaquín Sabina – Isi-Disi, Rough Love; "Atunes en el Paraíso" by Javier Ruibal – Tuna and Chocolate |
| Best Fictional Short Film: Diez minutos; Amigo no gima; Cara sucia; La ruta natural; Viernes | Best Animated Short Film: El enigma del chico croqueta; Minotauromaquia; The Trumouse Show; Vuela por mí |
| Best Documentary: El milagro de Candeal; De nens; ¡Hay motivo!; Salvador Allende | Best Documentary Short Film: Extras; Aerosol; El mundo es tuyo; El último minutero; Iván Z |

=== Films with multiple nominations and awards ===
Films with multiple nominations
| Nominations | Film |
|---|---|
| 15 | The Sea Inside |
| 6 | Ferpect Crime |
| 6 | Tiovivo c. 1950 |
| 5 | The Wolf |
| 5 | Unconscious |
| 4 | The 7th Day |
| 4 | Bad Education |
| 4 | Rome |
| 4 | Héctor |
| 3 | Swindled |
| 2 | Things That Make Living Worthwhile |
| 2 | Romasanta |
| 2 | Cold Winter Sun |
| 2 | Don't Move |
| 2 | Astronauts |
| 2 | Hours of Light |
| 2 | Isi-Disi, Rough Love |
| 2 | El milagro de Candeal |

Films with multiple awards
| Awards | Film |
|---|---|
| 14 | The Sea Inside |
| 2 | The Wolf |
| 2 | El milagro de Candeal |

== Honorary Goya ==
- José Luis López Vázquez
