= List of Spanish films of 2004 =

A list of Spanish-produced and co-produced feature films released in Spain in 2004. The domestic theatrical release date is favoured.

== Films ==
Release		Title (Domestic title)	Cast & Crew	Distribution label	Ref.
J A N U A R Y	9	Agujeros en el cielo	Director: Pedro Mari Santos Cast: Ander Lipus, Itziar Ituño, Montse Zabalza, Aiora Sedano, Alberto San Juan, Melani Olivares, Saturnino García	Barton Films	
J A N U A R Y	16	The Pedal-Push Car (El coche de pedales)	Director: Ramón Barea Cast: Álex Angulo, Rosana Pastor, Pablo Gómez, María Pastor, Cesáreo Estébanez, Ane Gabarain	Alokatu	
J A N U A R Y	16	Christmas on the Nile (Navidad en en Nilo)	Director: Neri Parenti	United International Pictures	
J A N U A R Y	30	Your Next Life (La vida que te espera)	Director: Manuel Gutiérrez Aragón Cast: Juan Diego, Luis Tosar, Marta Etura, Clara Lago, Celso Bugallo, Víctor Clavijo	Alta Classics	
J A N U A R Y	30	Trileros	Director: Antonio del Real Cast: Juanjo Puigcorbé, Juan Echanove, Esther Cañadas, José Sancho, Antonio Gamero, Mariola Fuentes, Enrique Villén, Antonio Resines	Columbia TriStar	
F E B R U A R Y	6	Magic Bay (Bahía mágica)	Director: Marina Valentini Cast: Liz Lobato, Carlos Álvarez-Nóvoa, Mariano Arenas, Fabián Arenillas, Jean Pierre Noher	Sherlock Films	
F E B R U A R Y	13	Kill Me Tender (Haz conmigo lo que quieras)	Director: Ramón de España Cast: Ingrid Rubio, Alberto San Juan, Emilio Gutiérrez Caba, Manuel Manquiña, Chusa Barbero	Buena Vista International	
F E B R U A R Y	27	Voices in the Night (Las voces de la noche)	Director: Salvador García Ruiz Cast: Laia Marull, Tristán Ulloa, Vicky Peña, Malena Alterio	Columbia TriStar	
F E B R U A R Y	27	Bear Cub (Cachorro)	Director: Miguel Albaladejo Cast: José Luis García Pérez, David Castillo, Diana Cerezo, Mario Arias, Arno Chevrier, Josele Román, Elvira Lindo, Empar Ferrer, Félix Álvarez	Manga Films	
M A R C H	5	Astronauts (Astronautas)	Director: Santi Amodeo Cast: Nancho Novo, Teresa Hurtado, Alex O'Dogherty, Enrico Vecchi, Julián Villagrán	Alta Classics	
M A R C H	19	Bad Education (La mala educación)	Director: Pedro Almodóvar Cast: Gael García Bernal, Fele Martínez, Daniel Giménez Cacho, Lluís Homar, Francisco Boira, Javier Cámara	Warner Sogefilms	
M A R C H	26	Nicotina	Director: Hugo Rodríguez Cast: Diego Luna, Lucas Crespi, Jesús Ochoa, Daniel Giménez Cacho, Marta Belaustegui, Carmen Madrid	Manga Films	
M A R C H	26	Cleopatra	Director: Eduardo Mignogna Cast: Norma Aleandro, Natalia Oreiro, Leonardo Sbaraglia, Héctor Alterio, Alberto de Mendoza	Sólida	
A P R I L	2	Lost Embrace (El abrazo partido)	Director: Daniel Burman Cast: Daniel Hendler, Adriana Aizemberg, Sergio Boris, Jorge D'Elia, Rosita Londner, Diego Korol, Silvina Bosco, Melina Petriella	Nirvana Films	
A P R I L	2	The Archimedes Principle (El principio de Arquímedes)	Director: Gerardo Herrero Cast: Marta Belaustegui, Manuel Morón, Alicia Sánchez, Roberto Enríquez, Blanca Oteyza, Alberto Jiménez	Alta Classics	
A P R I L	23	The 7th Day (El séptimo día)	Director: Carlos Saura Cast: Juan Diego, José Luis Gómez, Victoria Abril, Ana Wagener	United International Pictures	
A P R I L	28	The Year of the Flood (El año del diluvio)	Director: Jaime Chávarri Cast: Fanny Ardant, Darío Grandinetti, Eloy Azorín, Pepa López	United International Pictures	
A P R I L	30	Summer's Clouds (Nubes de verano)	Director: Felipe Vega Cast: Roberto Enríquez, David Selvas, Irene Montalà, Natalia Millán, Roger Casamajor	Alta Classics	
A P R I L	30	The Violet Look (La mirada violeta)	Director: Nacho Pérez de la Paz, Jesús Ruiz Cast: Cayetana Guillén Cuervo, Roberto Enríquez, Isabel Ordaz, Alberto Jiménez, Julieta Serrano, Asier Etxeandía, Nilo Mur, Aida Folch, Chisco Amado	Columbia TriStar	
A P R I L	30	Tuna and Chocolate (Atún y chocolate)	Director: Pablo Carbonell Cast: Pablo Carbonell, María Barranco, Pedro Reyes, Antonio Dechent, Rosario Pardo	Warner Sogefilms	
M A Y	7	Whore (Yo, puta)	Director: María Lidón Cast: Daryl Hannah, Denise Richards	DeAPlaneta	
M A Y	7	Héctor	Director: Gracia Querejeta Cast: Adriana Ozores, Nilo Mur, Joaquín Climent	Warner Sogefilms	
M A Y	7	The Whore and the Whale (La puta y la ballena)	Director: Luis Puenzo Cast: Aitana Sánchez-Gijón, Leonardo Sbaraglia, Miguel Ángel Solá, Mercé Llorens, Pep Munnè	Nirvana Films	(Note: Co-production Spain–Argentina (50%–50%).)
M A Y	14	Romasanta	Director: Paco Plaza Cast: Elsa Pataky, Julian Sands, Gary Piquer, John Sharian, Laura Mañá, Maru Valdivielso	Filmax	
M A Y	28	A+ (A+ (Amas))	Director: Xavier Ribera Perpiñá Cast: Eloy Azorín, Elvira Herrería, Carlos Fuentes, Misia, Ricardo Moya, Fernando Ramallo, Eloi Yebra, Najwa Nimri, José Coronado	DeAPlaneta	
M A Y	28	Common Dead (Muertos comunes)	Director: Norberto Ramos del Val Cast: Javier Albalá, Ernesto Alterio, Luchy López, Adolfo Fernández, Ion Inciarte, Fernando Delgado, Pilar Castro	Filmax	
J U N E	11	The Reckoning (El misterio de Wells)	Director: Paul McGuigan Cast: Willem Dafoe, Vincent Cassel, Paul Bettany	Columbia TriStar	(Note: Co-production Spain–United Kingdom (28%–72%).)
J U N E	11	Machuca	Director: Andrés Wood Cast: Matías Quer, Aline Küppenheim, Federico Luppi	Alta Classics	
J U L Y	9	Only Human (Seres queridos)	Director: Teresa de Pelegrí, Dominic Harari Cast: Norma Aleandro, Guillermo Toledo, Marián Aguilera, María Botto	Alta Classics	(Note: Co-production Spain–Portugal–United Kingdom–Argentina (57.20%–10.00%–22.80%–10.00%).)
J U L Y	9	Swindled (Incautos)	Director: Miguel Bardem Cast: Ernesto Alterio, Victoria Abril, Federico Luppi	Hispano Foxfilm	
J U L Y	16	Iris	Director: Rosa Vergés Cast: Silke, Ana Torrent, Ginés García Millán, Nacho Fresneda	Sólida	
J U L Y	23	Isi-Disi, Rough Love (Isi/Disi. Amor a lo bestia)	Director: Chema de la Peña Cast: Santiago Segura, Florentino Fernández, Jaydy Michel	United International Pictures	
A U G U S T	13	Body Confusion (Fuera del cuerpo)	Director: Vicente Peñarrocha Cast: Gustavo Salmerón, José Coronado, Goya Toledo, Juan Sanz, Elia Galera, María Valverde	Sólida	
A U G U S T	27	Unconscious (Inconscientes)	Director: Joaquín Oristrell Cast: Leonor Watling, Luis Tosar, Mercedes Sampietro, Juanjo Puigcorbé, Núria Prims, Àlex Brendemühl	Alta Classics	
A U G U S T	27	Deadly Cargo (Cámara oscura)	Director: Pau Freixas Cast: Silke, Unax Ugalde	Manga Films	
S E P T E M B E R	3	The Sea Inside (Mar adentro)	Director: Alejandro Amenábar Cast; Javier Bardem, Lola Dueñas, Belén Rueda, Mabel Rivera, Celso Bugallo, Clara Segura, Joan Dalmau, Tamar Novas, Josep Maria Pou	Warner Sogefilms	
S E P T E M B E R	17	Don't Move (No te muevas)	Director: Sergio Castellitto Cast: Penélope Cruz, Sergio Castellitto, Claudia Gerini, Marco Giallini	Sólida	(Note: Co-production Spain–Italy–United Kingdom (26.40%–58.60%–15.00%).)
S E P T E M B E R	24	Hours of Light (Horas de luz)	Director: Manolo Matji Cast: Alberto San Juan, Emma Suárez, José Ángel Egido, Vicente Romero, Andrés Lima, Ana Wagener, Aitor Merino, Paco Marín	Warner Sogefilms	
S E P T E M B E R	24	The Truth and Other Lies (El juego de la verdad)	Director: Álvaro Fernández Armero Cast: Tristán Ulloa, Natalia Verbeke, Óscar Jaenada, María Esteve	Manga Films	
O C T O B E R	1	Tiovivo c. 1950	Director: José Luis Garci Cast: Aurora Bautista, Fernando Fernán-Gómez, María Asquerino, Alfredo Landa, Carlos Hipólito, Manuel Galiana, Ángel de Andrés López, Elsa Pataki, Ramón Langa, María Adánez Fernando Guillén Cuervo, José María Pou, Ana Fernández, Andrés Pajares, Carlos Larrañaga	Columbia TriStar	
O C T O B E R	1	Roma	Director: Adolfo Aristarain Cast: Juan Diego Botto, José Sacristán, Susú Pecoraro, Agustín Garvie, Marina Glezer, Marcos Mundstock	Alta Classics	(Note: Co-production Spain–Argentina (80%–20%).)
O C T O B E R	8	Hypnos (Hipnos)	Director: David Carreras Cast: Cristina Brondo, Demián Bichir, Féodor Atkine, Natalia Sánchez	United International Pictures	
O C T O B E R	22	The Perfect Crime (Crimen Ferpecto)	Director: Álex de la Iglesia Cast: Guillermo Toledo, Mónica Cervera, Luis Varela, Fernando Tejero	Warner Sogefilms	
O C T O B E R	29	Dearest Maria (María querida)	Director: José Luis García Sánchez Cast: Pilar Bardem, María Botto, Álex O'Dogherty, Juan Diego, María Galiana	Alta Classics	
N O V E M B E R	5	The Wolf (El Lobo)	Director: Miguel Courtois Cast: Eduardo Noriega, José Coronado, Jorge Sanz	Filmax	
N O V E M B E R	12	Say I Do (Di que sí)	Director: Juan Calvo Cast: Santi Millán, Paz Vega, Pepe Viyuela, Constantino Romero, Chus Lampreave, Santiago Segura, Ornella Muti	Columbia TriStar	
N O V E M B E R	12	Cold Winter Sun (Frío sol de invierno)	Director: Pablo Malo Cast: Unax Ugalde, Marisa Paredes, Javier Pereira, Marta Etura, Raquel Pérez, Andrés Gertrúdix	Nirvana Films	
N O V E M B E R	26	Things That Make Living Worthwhile (Cosas que hacen que la vida valga la pena)	Director: Manuel Gómez Pereira Cast: Ana Belén, Eduard Fernández	Columbia TriStar	
N O V E M B E R	26	The Holy Girl (La niña santa)	Director: Lucrecia Martel Cast: Mercedes Morán, Carlos Belloso, Alejandro Urdapilleta, María Alché, Mía Maestro, Julieta Zylberberg	Nirvana Films	
D E C E M B E R	3	The Amazing World of Borjamari and Pocholo (El asombroso mundo de Borjamari y Pocholo)	Director: Enrique López Lavigne, Juan Cavestany Cast: Santiago Segura, Javier Gutiérrez, Pilar Castro	Warner Sogefilms	
D E C E M B E R	17	The Machinist (El maquinista)	Director: Brad Anderson Cast: Christian Bale, Jennifer Jason Leigh, Aitana Sánchez-Gijón, Michael Ironside	Filmax	
D E C E M B E R	22	The Bridge of San Luis Rey (El puente de san Luis Rey)	Director: Mary McGuckian Cast: Robert De Niro, Harvey Keitel, Kathy Bates, Gabriel Byrne, Pilar López de Ayala, Geraldine Chaplin	Columbia TriStar	

== Box office ==
The five highest-grossing Spanish films in 2004, by domestic box office gross revenue, are as follows:

Highest-grossing films of 2004
Rank	Title	Distributor	Admissions	Domestic gross (€)
1	The Sea Inside (Mar adentro)	Warner Sogefilms	3,998,550	19,353,426.59
2	Isi-Disi, Rough Love (Isi/Disi. Amor a lo bestia)	United International Pictures	1,578,671	7,362,347.17
3	The Wolf (El lobo)	Filmax	1,422,719	7,070,792.63
4	Bad Education (La mala educación)	Warner Sogefilms	1,242,621	6,116,247.08
5	The Ferpect Crime (Crimen Ferpecto)	Warner Sogefilms	851,492	4,216,832.01
6	The Amazing World of Borjamari and Pocholo (El asombroso mundo de Borjamari y Pocholo)	Warner Sogefilms	655,589	3,316,634.03
7	Say I Do (Di que sí)	Columbia TriStar	606,164	2,957,992.11
8	Take My Eyes (Te doy mis ojos) ‡	Alta Classics	372,561	1,699,377.42
9	Moon of Avellaneda (Luna de Avellaneda)	Alta Classics	309,551	1,563,270.70
10	Hypnos (Hipnos)	United International Pictures	261,721	1,291,175.51
‡: 2003 theatrical opening

== See also ==
- 19th Goya Awards
