= 14th Actors and Actresses Union Awards =

2005 awards ceremony in Madrid, Spain

- Date: 20 June 2005
- Site: Palacio de Congresos y Exposiciones, Madrid, Spain
- Hosted by: Concha Velasco, Quésquíspás
- Organized by: Actors and Actresses Union

Highlights
- Honorary career award: Agustín González (posthumous)

The 14th Actors and Actresses Union Awards ceremony was held on 20 June 2005 at Madrid's Palacio de Congresos y Exposiciones. The gala was hosted by Concha Velasco and the comedy duo 'Quésquíspás'.

In addition to the competitive awards, Agustín González obtained the 'Toda una vida' life achievement career award on a posthumous basis, whilst the Special Award went to Fundación Aisge.

== Winners and nominees ==
The winners and nominees are listed as follows:

=== Film ===
Best Male Performance in a Leading Role: Javier Bardem — The Sea Inside; Eduard Fernández — Things That Make Living Worthwhile; Gael García Bernal — Bad Education	Best Female Performance in a Leading Role: Adriana Ozores — Héctor; Ana Belén — Things That Make Living Worthwhile; Pilar Bardem — Dearest Maria
Best Male Performance in a Secondary Role: Celso Bugallo — The Sea Inside; Juan Diego — The 7th Day; Unax Ugalde — Héctor	Best Female Performance in a Secondary Role: Lola Dueñas — The Sea Inside; Mabel Rivera — The Sea Inside; Silvia Abascal — The Wolf
Best Male Performance in a Minor Role: Javier Cámara — Bad Education; Joan Dalmau — The Sea Inside; Santiago Ramos — The Wolf	Best Female Performance in a Minor Role: Victoria Abril — The 7th Day; Marta Etura — Cold Winter Sun; Raquel Pérez — Cold Winter Sun

=== Television ===
Best Male Performance in a Leading Role: Gonzalo de Castro — 7 vidas; Antonio Resines — Los Serrano; Imanol Arias — Cuéntame cómo pasó	Best Female Performance in a Leading Role: María Adánez — Aquí no hay quien viva; Alicia Borrachero — Hospital Central; Débora Izaguirre — El inquilino
Best Male Performance in a Secondary Role: Eduardo Gómez — Aquí no hay quien viva; Antonio Molero — Los Serrano; Santi Millán — 7 vidas	Best Female Performance in a Secondary Role: Carmen Machi — 7 vidas; Fátima Baeza — Hospital Central; Laura Pamplona — Aquí no hay quien viva
Best Male Performance in a Minor Role: Guillermo Ortega — Aquí no hay quien viva; Félix Corcuera — Cuéntame cómo pasó; José Luis Alcobendas — Cuéntame cómo pasó	Best Female Performance in a Minor Role: Mariví Bilbao — Aquí no hay quien viva; Eva Isanta — Aquí no hay quien viva; Gemma Cuervo — Aquí no hay quien viva

=== Theatre ===
Best Male Performance in a Leading Role: Héctor Alterio — Yo, Claudio; Carmelo Gómez — La cena; Jesús Hierónides — Todas las palabras	Best Female Performance in a Leading Role: Blanca Portillo — La hija del aire; Cristina Marcos — El método Grönholm; Nuria Espert — La Celestina
Best Male Performance in a Secondary Role: Juanjo Otegui — The Price; Antonio Garrido — El otro lado de la cama; Israel Frías — Yo, Claudio	Best Female Performance in a Secondary Role: Isabel Pintor — Yo, Claudio; Cristina Fenollar — Los verdes campos del Edén; Marta Solaz — Cantando bajo la lluvia
Best Male Performance in a Minor Role: Javier Vázquez — Los verdes campos del Edén; Alberto Berzal — Yo, Claudio; Luis Rallo — Yo, Claudio	Best Female Performance in a Minor Role: Arantxa Aranguren — Yo, Claudio; Eva Higueras — Los verdes campos del Edén; Ramata Koyte — Los verdes campos del Edén

=== Newcomers ===
Best New Actor: Tamar Novas — The Sea Inside; Jorge Roelas — Tiovivo c. 1950; Nilo Mur — Héctor	Best New Actress: Belén Rueda — The Sea Inside; Mónica Cervera — The Ferpect Crime; Nuria Gago — Héctor
