= 4th AARP Movies for Grownups Awards =

Film award ceremony

- Date: January 30, 2005

Highlights
- Most nominations: The Notebook (4)

The 4th AARP Movies for Grownups Awards, presented by AARP the Magazine, honored films released in 2004 made by people over the age of 50. This was the last year that the awards were announced by the magazine without an in-person awards ceremony. Lynn Redgrave won the award for Breakaway Performance for Kinsey. This year's ceremony also featured a number of noncompetitive, less-serious awards, such as the "Who's Your Daddy? Romantic Gap Prize" for the movie with the most implausible age gap in a romantic pair. This was the last year for which there was no in-person awards ceremony; instead, winners were sent a trophy in the shape of a golden theater seat, called La Chaise d'Or.

== Awards ==
=== Winners and Nominees ===
Winners are listed first, highlighted in boldface, and indicated with a double dagger (‡).

**Best Movie for Grownups**: **Ray**‡; The Aviator; In Good Company; The Notebook; Sideways	**Best Director**: **Mike Nichols – Closer**‡; Clint Eastwood - Million Dollar Baby; Taylor Hackford - Ray; Michael Mann - Collateral; Martin Scorsese - The Aviator; Ousmane Sembène - Moolaadé
**Best Actor**: **Liam Neeson - Kinsey**‡; Jeff Bridges - The Door in the Floor; Richard Gere - Shall We Dance?; Dennis Quaid - In Good Company; Kurt Russell - Miracle; Omar Sharif - Monsieur Ibrahim	**Best Actress**: **Anne Reid - The Mother**‡; Cloris Leachman - Spanglish; Gena Rowlands - The Notebook; Susan Sarandon - Shall We Dance?; Meryl Streep - The Manchurian Candidate; Lily Tomlin - I Heart Huckabees
**Best Screenwriter**: **Alvin Sargent - Spider-Man 2**‡; Pedro Almodóvar - Bad Education; James L. Brooks - Spanglish; Paul Haggis and F.X. Toole - Million Dollar Baby	**Best Time Capsule**: **De-Lovely**‡; The Aviator; Beyond the Sea; The Notebook; Vera Drake
**Best Intergenerational Film**: **Miracle**‡; Baadasssss!; Monsieur Ibrahim; The Five Obstructions; Spanglish	**Best Grownup Love Story**: **James Garner and Gena Rowlands - The Notebook**‡; Robert Redford and Helen Mirren - The Clearing; Dennis Quaid and Marg Helgenberger - In Good Company; Richard Gere and Susan Sarandon - Shall We Dance?
**Best Movie for Grownups Who Refuse to Grow Up**: **The Incredibles**‡; Anchorman; Dodgeball: A True Underdog Story; Mean Girls; The Polar Express	**Best TV Movie**: **The Five People You Meet in Heaven**; The Life and Death of Peter Sellers
**Best Documentary**: **Festival Express**‡; Control Room; Metallica: Some Kind of Monster; Riding Giants; The Story of the Weeping Camel	**Best Foreign Film**: **Good Bye, Lenin! - Germany**‡; The Motorcycle Diaries - Argentina; Osama - Afghanistan; Monsieur Ibrahim - France; The Sea Inside - Spain

=== Breakaway Accomplishment ===
- Lynn Redgrave: "Redgrave appears for just over two minutes and 50 seconds, yet after nearly 40 years of roles that barely touched on her skills, her soliloquy as a woman telling her story to the controversial sex researcher is so breathtaking and heartfelt she delivers what amounts to a benediction."

==== Runners Up ====
- Tom Selleck for Ike: Countdown to D-Day
- Meryl Streep for Stuck on You

=== Other Awards and Prizes ===
- Who's Your Daddy? Romantic Gap Prize: Steve Martin (60) and Claire Danes (26) in Shopgirl
- Woman of the Year: Joan Allen for Off the Map, Yes, and The Upside of Anger
- Best DVD Rerelease: Dracula
- Medal of Bravery: Jane Seymour, "for her fearlessly sexy romp as the senator's wife in Wedding Crashers."
- Not-Scared-Shirtless Prize: Liam Neeson (Batman Begins) and Dennis Quaid (Yours, Mine & Ours)
- Remake from Hell Award: The Honeymooners
- Worst Roommate: Tom Cruise and Tim Robbins in War of the Worlds
- Christopher Walken 911 Award: "Mediocre flicks saved by his mere presence: 2 (Domino and Romance and Cigarettes)"

=== Films with multiple nominations ===
Films that received multiple nominations
Nominations	Film
4	The Notebook
3	The Aviator
3	In Good Company
3	Monsieur Ibrahim
3	Shall We Dance?
3	Spanglish
2	Million Dollar Baby
2	Miracle
2	Ray
