= Dearest Maria =

- Theatrical release poster
- Spanish: María querida
- Directed by: José Luis García Sánchez
- Screenplay by: Rafael Azcona
- Produced by: Antonio P. Pérez; Paco Lobatón
- Starring: Pilar Bardem; María Botto; Alex O'Dogherty; Juan Diego; María Galiana
- Cinematography: Juan Amorós
- Edited by: Vanesa L. Marimbert
- Music by: Antonio Meliveo
- Production companies: Maestranza Films; Redacción 7 Andalucía
- Distributed by: Alta Films
- Release dates: 24 October 2004 (Seminci); 29 October 2004 (Spain)
- Country: Spain
- Language: Spanish

Dearest Maria (Spanish: María querida) is a 2004 Spanish drama film directed by José Luis García Sánchez from a screenplay by Rafael Azcona based on the figure of María Zambrano. It stars María Botto and Pilar Bardem.

== Plot ==
The plot takes place between 1989 and 1991. Journalist Lola meets author María Zambrano in 1989, upon Zambrano's reception of the Cervantes Prize, leading Lola to make Zambrano's biopic.

== Cast ==
- Pilar Bardem as María Zambrano
- María Botto as Lola
- Alex O'Dogherty as Pepe
- María Galiana as Carmen
- Juan Diego as Luis
- Jordi Dauder as locutor del montaje

== Production ==
The film is a Maestranza Films and Redacción 7 Andalucía production.

== Release ==
The film premiered in competition at the 49th Valladolid International Film Festival (Seminci) on 24 October 2004. Distributed by Alta Films, it was released theatrically in Spain on 29 October 2004.

== Reception ==
Jonathan Holland of Variety wrote that García Sánchez "fails for the most part to galvanize the potential high drama".

Casimiro Torreiro of El País wrote that the film "will go down in the annals as a worthy effort to didactically marry cinema for the general public with the usual rigor of documentary editing".

== Accolades ==
Year	Award	Category	Nominee(s)	Result	Ref.
2004	49th Valladolid International Film Festival	Best Actress	Pilar Bardem	Won	
2005	19th Goya Awards	Best Actress	Pilar Bardem	Nominated	
2005	14th Actors and Actresses Union Awards	Best Film Actress in a Leading Role	Pilar Bardem	Nominated	

== See also ==
- List of Spanish films of 2004
