= Alone (1999 film) =

- Spanish film poster
- Spanish: Solas
- Directed by: Benito Zambrano
- Written by: Benito Zambrano
- Produced by: Antonio P. Pérez
- Starring: María Galiana; Ana Fernández; Carlos Álvarez; Antonio Dechent
- Cinematography: Tote Trenas
- Edited by: Fernando Pardo
- Music by: Antonio Meliveo
- Production company: Maestranza Films
- Distributed by: Fireworks Pictures
- Release dates: February 1999 (Berlinale); 5 March 1999 (Spain)
- Running time: 101 minutes
- Country: Spain
- Language: Spanish

Alone (Spanish: Solas) is a 1999 Spanish film written and directed by Benito Zambrano which stars María Galiana, Ana Fernández, Carlos Álvarez, and Antonio Dechent.

The film explores the lives of a mother and daughter and their struggle for survival and happiness. Both of the women in the story are portrayed as alone (sola, plural solas), each in her own way.

It won five Goya awards in 2000 and several other prizes.

== Plot ==
Alone tells the story of María (Ana Fernández) and her mother Rosa (María Galiana). María is one of four adult children, all of whom moved as far as they could get from their parents and the farm where they grew up. Before the movie starts, the father (later revealed to be a violent, cruel, abusive man) has fallen ill and been brought to a hospital in Seville, where María lives. Rosa has been staying at the hospital with him, but the doctor tells her to leave before she falls ill herself. María takes Rosa to stay with her in the rundown suburban apartment where she lives, and Rosa rides the bus every day to visit her husband.

María is intelligent and wanted an education, but her father wouldn't allow it. Now, at 35, she works for a cleaning service; she is lonely, poor, angry and bitter. She discovers she is pregnant by a man who doesn't want a baby and tells María to get an abortion. When she tells him she wants to have the baby and raise it with him, the man rejects her. In her anger and despair, María starts drinking heavily.

As her mother Rosa returns from shopping one day, she meets María's neighbor (vecino) Don Emilio (Carlos Álvarez-Nóvoa), a kind old widower living alone with his dog. A friendship blossoms between them: he lends Rosa some money when she runs short at the supermarket, and she cooks for him after he burns a stew he forgot was cooking. He falls in love with Rosa, but Rosa is faithful to her abusive husband. (At one point she says to María about her father, "He must not have an easy conscience. I do.")

Rosa's husband recovers and she returns with him to the country, not knowing about María's pregnancy. María tells Don Emilio about the baby and tells him she plans to abort it. In a long, emotional scene, he offers to be like a grandfather to the child if she decides to keep it, but María has been so badly treated by the men in her life that she has trouble believing him.

The movie ends with María visiting her parents' grave with her baby girl and Don Emilio. He is going to sell his apartment in Seville and the three of them will move into Rosa's house in the country to raise the baby.

== Cast ==
- María Galiana as Mother
- Ana Fernández as María
- Carlos Álvarez-Nóvoa as Neighbor
- Antonio Dechent as Doctor
- Paco De Osca as Father
- Juan Fernández as Juan

== Release ==
The film screened at the Panorama section of the 49th Berlin International Film Festival in February 1999. It was ensuingly pre-screened at the Lebrija's Juan Bernabé Theatre on 28 February 1999. It received a wide release in Spain on 5 March 1999.

== Awards and nominations ==
| Year | Award | Category | Nominee(s) | Result | Ref. |
|---|---|---|---|---|---|
| 2000 | 14th Goya Awards | Best Film | Solas | Nominated | |
| 2000 | 14th Goya Awards | Best Director | Benito Zambrano | Nominated | |
| 2000 | 14th Goya Awards | Best New Director | Benito Zambrano | Won | |
| 2000 | 14th Goya Awards | Best Original Screenplay | Benito Zambrano | Won | |
| 2000 | 14th Goya Awards | Best Original Score | Antonio Meliveo | Nominated | |
| 2000 | 14th Goya Awards | Best Supporting Actress | María Galiana | Won | |
| 2000 | 14th Goya Awards | Best New Actor | Carlos Álvarez-Nóvoa | Won | |
| 2000 | 14th Goya Awards | Best New Actress | Ana Fernández | Won | |
| 2000 | 14th Goya Awards | Best Production Supervision | Eduardo Santana | Nominated | |
| 2000 | 14th Goya Awards | Best Editing | Fernando Pardo | Nominated | |
| 2000 | 14th Goya Awards | Best Sound | Jorge Marín, Carlos Faruolo, Patrick Ghislain | Nominated | |
| 2001 | 43rd Ariel Awards | Best Ibero-American Film | Solas | Won | |

== See also ==
- List of Spanish films of 1999
