= Cold Winter Sun =

- Theatrical release poster
- Spanish: Frío sol de invierno
- Directed by: Pablo Malo
- Written by: Pablo Malo
- Produced by: Luis Goya
- Starring: Unax Ugalde; Marisa Paredes; Javier Pereira; Marta Etura; Raquel Pérez; Andrés Gertrúdix
- Cinematography: Pablo Rosso
- Edited by: Antonio Pérez Reina
- Music by: Aitor Amezaga
- Production company: Zine 1
- Distributed by: Nirvana Films
- Release dates: September 2004 (Zinemaldia); 12 November 2004 (Spain)
- Country: Spain
- Language: Spanish

Cold Winter Sun (Spanish: Frío sol de invierno) is a 2004 Spanish drama film directed and written by Pablo Malo which stars Unax Ugalde and Marisa Paredes alongside Javier Pereira, Marta Etura, Raquel Pérez, and Andrés Gertrúdix.

== Plot ==
The fiction is set in an unidentified city. Upon leaving a psychiatric hospital, Adrián (a young man from a well-off family) feels betrayed by his father, who has left the city, leaving his son the family house. He crosses paths with Gonzalo, an outcast who has a complicated relationship with his mother Raquel, a hooker.

== Cast ==
- Unax Ugalde as Adrián
- Marisa Paredes as Raquel
- Javier Pereira as Gonzalo
- Marta Etura as Mimo
- Andrés Gertrudix as Primo
- Raquel Pérez as Carmen
- Iñake Irastorza as Amelia
- Jorge Carrero as Abogado
- José Manuel Cervino as Chatarrero
- María Jesús Valdés

== Production ==
The screenplay was penned by Pablo Malo. The film was produced by Luis Goya (Zine 1). It boasted a budget of around €1.2 million. It was shot in October 2003 in the surroundings of San Sebastián, with some footage shot in Lisbon.

== Release ==
Cold Winter Sun premiered at the 52nd San Sebastián International Film Festival in September 2004. It also screened at the Viña del Mar International Film Festival, 4th 'EuropFilm' Mallorca Film Festival and the 5th Tudela Debut Film Festival. Distributed by Nirvana, it was theatrically released in Spain on 12 November 2004.

== Reception ==
Nuria Vidal of Fotogramas rated the film 3 of 5 stars deeming it to be a "cold film", "in which the characters live in an absolute loneliness made of strange relationships between each other that gradually unravel".

Casimiro Torreiro of El País described Cold Winter Sun as a crime film displaying "a thick tone and a considerably gloomy look", hampered by the overaccumulation of edgy elements which thereby compromise the verisimilitude of a debut film otherwise promising vis-à-vis its making and the direction of actors.

== Accolades ==
Year	Award	Category	Nominee(s)	Result	Ref.
2005	19th Goya Awards	Best New Director	Pablo Malo	Won	
2005	19th Goya Awards	Best Editing	Antonio Pérez Reina	Nominated	
2005	14th Actors and Actresses Union Awards	Best Film Actress in a Minor Role	Marta Etura	Nominated	
2005	14th Actors and Actresses Union Awards	Best Film Actress in a Minor Role	Raquel Pérez	Nominated	

== See also ==
- List of Spanish films of 2004
