= Hours of Light =

- Theatrical release poster
- Spanish: Horas de luz
- Directed by: Manolo Matji
- Screenplay by: José Ángel Esteban; Carlos López; Manolo Matji
- Produced by: Gustavo Ferrada
- Starring: Alberto San Juan; Emma Suárez; José Ángel Egido; Vicente Romero; Andrés Lima; Ana Wagener; Aitor Merino; Paco Marín
- Cinematography: José Luis López Linares
- Edited by: José María Biurrun
- Music by: Alfonso de Vilallonga
- Production companies: La Fiesta PC; Sogecine
- Distributed by: Warner Sogefilms
- Release dates: 20 September 2004 (Zinemaldia); 24 September 2004 (Spain)
- Country: Spain
- Language: Spanish

Hours of Light aka Light Hours (Spanish: Horas de luz) is a 2004 Spanish romance and prison drama film directed by Manolo Matji which stars Alberto San Juan and Emma Suárez.

== Plot ==
Based on a real events, the plot tracks the romantic relationship established in 1991 between prison nurse María del Mar "Marimar" Villar and Juan José Garfia, imprisoned because of the cold-blood murder of three in 1987.

== Cast ==
- Alberto San Juan as Juan José Garfia
- Emma Suárez as Mari Mar
- José Ángel Egido as Chincheta
- Vicente Romero as Morata
- Andrés Lima as Granizo
- Ana Wagener as Chus
- Aitor Merino as Tormo
- Daniel Núñez as Chester
- Paco Marín as Rafa

== Production ==
A Sogecine and La Fiesta production, the film had the participation of TVE, Telemadrid, and Canal+. Shooting began on 2 June 2003 and lasted for 8 weeks. The former Hospital Militar del Generalísimo in Calle de Isaac Peral (Madrid) stood in for indoor prison settings. Some outdoor scenes were shot in Leganés.

== Release ==
The film premiered in competition at the 52nd San Sebastián International Film Festival in September 2004. It was met by a chilly reception by the festival audience. Distributed by Warner Sogefilms, it was theatrically released in Spain on 24 September 2004.

== Reception ==
Jonathan Holland of Variety considered that despite its commendable intentions, the film is "hampered by its script's inability to follow through the logic of its premise to the emotionally satisfying conclusion it merits".

Casimiro Torreiro of El País considered the film to be both a discourse about remorse and a bet for social rehabilitation.

== Accolades ==
| Year | Award | Category | Nominee(s) | Result | Ref. |
|---|---|---|---|---|---|
| 2005 | 19th Goya Awards | Best Original Screenplay | José Ángel Esteban, Manolo Matji, Carlos López | Nominated | |
| 2005 | 19th Goya Awards | Best Editing | José María Biurrun | Nominated | |

== See also ==
- List of Spanish films of 2004
