= Héctor (film) =

- Theatrical release poster
- Directed by: Gracia Querejeta
- Written by: Gracia Querejeta; David Planell
- Produced by: Elías Querejeta
- Starring: Adriana Ozores; Nilo Mur; Joaquín Climent; Unax Ugalde; Nuria Gago; Pepo Oliva; José Luis García Pérez; Damián Alcázar
- Cinematography: Ángel Iguácel
- Edited by: Nacho Ruiz Capillas
- Music by: Ángel Illarramendi
- Production companies: Elías Querejeta PC; DeAPlaneta; Ensueño Films
- Distributed by: Warner Sogefilms
- Release dates: April 2004 (FMCE); 7 May 2004 (Spain)
- Country: Spain
- Language: Spanish

Héctor is a 2004 Spanish family drama film directed and co-written by Gracia Querejeta, starring Nilo Mur as the title character and Adriana Ozores. The film won the Best Picture Award at the Málaga Film Festival and scooped four nominations to the 19th Goya Awards.

== Plot ==
Set in Madrid, the plot tracks the vicissitudes of the adaptation of a 16-year-old teenager (Héctor) to a new home and living with his aunt and uncle (Tere and Juan) in the wake of the death of her mother due to an accident, as well as coping with loss and the arrival of his father Martín (unacquainted with Héctor) from Mexico.

== Cast ==
- Adriana Ozores as Tere
- Nilo Mur as Héctor
- Joaquín Climent as Juan
- Nuria Gago as Fany
- Unax Ugalde as Gorilo
- Damián Alcázar as Martín
- Pepo Oliva as Tomás
- José Luis García Pérez as Ángel
- Mariano Peña as Belarmino
- Elia Galera as Sofía

== Production ==
The screenplay was penned by Gracia Querejeta and David Planell. Ángel Iguácel worked as cinematographer whereas Nacho Ruiz Capillas took over editing. Produced by Elías Querejeta PC, DeAPlaneta and Ensueño Films, it had the participation of Canal+, Antena 3, TeleMadrid, Canal Sur, TVC, TVG, TVV, TV Canaria, Castilla-La Mancha Televisión. The film was shot in Madrid and its surroundings. Shooting wrapped by April 2003.

== Release ==
The film was presented at the Málaga Spanish Film Festival (FMCE) in April 2004. Distributed by Warner Sogefilms, Héctor was theatrically released in Spain on 7 May 2004.

== Reception ==
Jonathan Holland of Variety deemed the film to be "a wonderfully observed, intense family drama in which virtually every scene pulsates with warmth, compassion and intelligence".

Mirito Torreiro of Fotogramas rated the film with 3 out of 5 stars, praising the Querejeta's search for new territories while considering the "hieratic" register Mur was required to play as a negative point.

== Accolades ==
| Year | Award | Category | Nominee(s) | Result | Ref. |
|---|---|---|---|---|---|
| 2004 | 7th Málaga Spanish Film Festival | Golden Biznaga for Best Film | | Won | |
| 2004 | 7th Málaga Spanish Film Festival | Silver Biznaga for Best Actress | Adriana Ozores | Won | |
| 2005 | 60th CEC Medals | Best Film | | Won | |
| 2005 | 60th CEC Medals | Best Director | Gracia Querejeta | Won | |
| 2005 | 60th CEC Medals | Best Actress | Adriana Ozores | Won | |
| 2005 | 60th CEC Medals | Best Supporting Actor | Pepo Oliva | Nominated | |
| 2005 | 60th CEC Medals | Best Supporting Actress | Nuria Gago | Nominated | |
| 2005 | 60th CEC Medals | Best Original Screenplay | David Planell, Gracia Querejeta | Won | |
| 2005 | 60th CEC Medals | Best Editing | Nacho Ruiz Capillas | Won | |
| 2005 | 60th CEC Medals | Best Music | Ángel Illarramendi | Won | |
| 2005 | 60th CEC Medals | Best Newcomer | Nilo Mur | Nominated | |
| 2005 | 19th Goya Awards | Best Supporting Actor | Unax Ugalde | Nominated | |
| 2005 | 19th Goya Awards | Best New Actress | Nuria Gago | Nominated | |
| 2005 | 19th Goya Awards | Best New Actor | Nilo Mur | Nominated | |
| 2005 | 19th Goya Awards | Best Original Score | Ángel Illarramendi | Nominated | |
| 2005 | 14th Actors and Actresses Union Awards | Best Film Actress in a Leading Role | Adriana Ozores | Won | |
| 2005 | 14th Actors and Actresses Union Awards | Best Film Actor in a Secondary Role | Unax Ugalde | Nominated | |
| 2005 | 14th Actors and Actresses Union Awards | Best New Actor | Nilo Mur | Nominated | |
| 2005 | 14th Actors and Actresses Union Awards | Best New Actress | Nuria Gago | Nominated | |

== See also ==
- List of Spanish films of 2004
