= Doghead (film) =

- Theatrical release poster
- Spanish: Cabeza de perro
- Directed by: Santi Amodeo
- Written by: Santi Amodeo
- Produced by: José Antonio Félez
- Starring: Juan José Ballesta; Adriana Ugarte; Julián Villagrán; Alex O'Dogherty; Juanma Lara; Ana Wagener; Jimmy Roca; Jorge Roelas; Ana Gracia; Mariano Peña; Jordi Dauder; Manuel Alexandre
- Cinematography: Alex Catalán
- Edited by: José M. G. Moyano
- Music by: Santi Amodeo
- Production companies: Tesela PC; La Zanfoña
- Distributed by: Alta Classics
- Release date: 6 October 2006
- Country: Spain
- Language: Spanish

Doghead (Spanish: Cabeza de perro) is a 2006 Spanish drama film directed, written and scored by Santi Amodeo starring Juan José Ballesta and Adriana Ugarte.

== Plot ==
Displaying a fable-like tone and an omniscient off-camera narrator, the plot tracks the mishaps of Samuel, affected by a rare neurological condition and overprotected by his family.

== Cast ==
- Juan José Ballesta as Samuel
- Adriana Ugarte as Consuelo
- Julián Villagrán as Eduardo
- Ana Wagener as Rosa
- Alex O'Dogherty as narrador
- Manuel Alexandre as Angelito
- Juanma Lara
- Jorge Roelas
- Jimmy Roca as Moobi
- Jordi Dauder
- Ana Gracia
- Mariano Peña

== Production ==
A Tesela Producciones Cinematográficas and La Zanfoña Producciones production, the film had the participation of Canal Sur and Canal+. Shooting took place in Seville, Costa del Sol and Madrid.

== Released ==
Distributed by Alta Classics, the film was theatrically released in Spain on 6 October 2006. The film also screened at the 10th Shanghai International Film Festival held in June 2007.

== Reception ==
Jonathan Holland of Variety, deemed Doghead to be a "revitalizing, winsomely idiosyncratic" film, with the result of Amodeo's craft being "a visually striking, deceptively subtle item that revels in its unconventionality".

Javier Ocaña of El País, considered that the film possesses "a very special magic and a strange poetry", blending in "a modern visualization and a script between the profound and the candorous".

== Accolades ==
Year	Award	Category	Nominee(s)	Result	Ref.
2007	21st Goya Awards	Best New Actress	Adriana Ugarte	Nominated	
2007	10th Shanghai International Film Festival	Best Actor	Juan José Ballesta	Won	

== See also ==
- List of Spanish films of 2006
