= Swindled (film) =

- Theatrical release poster
- Spanish: Incautos
- Directed by: Miguel Bardem
- Screenplay by: Carlos Martín; Miguel Bardem
- Produced by: Francisco Ramos
- Starring: Ernesto Alterio; Victoria Abril; Federico Luppi; Gilbert Melki; Alejandro Casaseca; Luis Castejón; Manuel Alexandre; Manuel Morón
- Cinematography: Thierry Arbogast
- Edited by: Iván Aledo
- Music by: Juan Bardem
- Production companies: Alquimia Cinema; Mandarin Films
- Distributed by: Hispano Foxfilm (es)
- Release dates: 24 April 2004 (Málaga); 9 July 2004 (Spain)
- Countries: Spain; France
- Language: Spanish

Swindled or Taken In (Spanish: Incautos) is a 2004 Spanish-French thriller film directed by Miguel Bardem which stars Ernesto Alterio, Victoria Abril, and Federico Luppi.

== Plot ==
After a time learning the ropes with aging Manco, swindler Ernesto ends up teaming up with alpha conman Federico. Federico's former lover Pilar persuades the former to pull a large-scale scam.

== Cast ==
- Ernesto Alterio as Ernesto
- Victoria Abril as Pilar
- Federico Luppi as Federico
- Manuel Alexandre as Manco
- Gilbert Melki as Mellado
- Alejandro Casaseca as Gitano
- Manuel Morón
- Luis Castejón
- Alfredo Villa
- Roman Luknár
- Juan Meseguer

== Production ==
The screenplay was written by Carlos Martín and Miguel Bardem. A Spanish-French co-production, the film was produced by Alquimia Cinema and Mandarin Films in association with Telemadrid, Canal 9, Canal+, and TVE. Shooting locations included Madrid, (including the Círculo de Bellas Artes and the Segovia Viaduct in the city) and the province of Segovia. The film originated from a newspaper story about a woman who had been swindled out of a million pesetas. Miguel Bardem then began collecting newspaper reports on scams and confidence tricks to develop the film. After completing the second draft of the screenplay, Bardem considered abandoning the project. However, he then fell victim to a robbery himself and decided to move forward with it.

== Release ==
The film was presented in the official selection of the 7th Málaga Film Festival in April 2004. Distributed by Hispano Foxfilm, it was theatrically released in Spain on 9 July 2004.

== Reception ==
Todd Brown of ScreenAnarchy pointed out that even if the film would have benefited from giving the characters "a little [more] time to pause and breathe", "it is nonetheless an entertaining caper film, one in which nothing is ever quite as it seems".

Jonathan Holland of Variety deemed the "effective but inelegant grifters" film to be as "hyperactive, ostentatious and hollow as the characters it describes", and unable to hold after its first hour.

Mirito Torreiro of Fotogramas rated the film 3 out of 5 stars, deeming it to be "an entertaining device to narrate an already-seen story, but to which Bardem's narrative pulse gives a good rhythm", otherwise singling out a "splendid" Victoria Abril as the film's standout.

== Accolades ==
Year	Award	Category	Nominee(s)	Result	Ref.
2005	19th Goya Awards	Best Editing	Iván Aledo	Nominated	
2005	19th Goya Awards	Best Original Song	"Corre" by Bebe	Nominated	
2005	19th Goya Awards	Best Sound	Jaime Fernández, Pierre Lorraine, Polo Aledo	Nominated	

== See also ==
- List of Spanish films of 2004
