= Body Confusion =

- Theatrical release poster
- Spanish: Fuera del cuerpo
- Directed by: Vicente Peñarrocha
- Written by: Vicente Peñarrocha
- Produced by: Eduardo Campoy
- Starring: Gustavo Salmerón; José Coronado; Goya Toledo; Juan Sanz; Rocío Muñoz; Elia Galera
- Cinematography: José David Montero
- Edited by: Luisma del Valle
- Music by: Mario de Benito
- Production company: Cartel
- Distributed by: Sólida
- Release dates: 29 April 2004 (Málaga); 13 August 2004 (Spain)
- Country: Spain
- Language: Spanish

Body Confusion (Spanish: Fuera del cuerpo) is a 2004 Spanish fantasy comedy-drama film written and directed by Vicente Peñarrocha. It stars Gustavo Salmerón, José Coronado, and Goya Toledo.

== Plot ==
Bruno, a Guardia Civil agent at a low-ebb, finds out that he actually is an actor (Alex) portraying a character in a movie. He seeks to reach out to the movie director in a parallel reality to get his affairs in order.

== Cast ==
- Gustavo Salmerón as Bruno / Alex
- José Coronado as Marcos / Adolfo
- Goya Toledo as Bárbara / Julia
- Juan Sanz as David / Juanma
- Rocío Muñoz as Rosa / Carmen
- Elia Galera as Esther
- Guillermo Ortega as Juan
- Lula Legorburu as Mamen
- Sonia Jávaga as Natalia
- María Valverde as Cuca

== Production ==
The film is a Cartel production. Shooting locations included Madrid and its surroundings.

== Release ==
The film was presented at the Málaga Film Festival in April 2004. It was released theatrically in Spain on 13 August 2004. Distributed by Sólida, it was released theatrically on 13 August 2004.

== Reception ==
Mirito Torreiro of Fotogramas rated the film 3 out of 5 stars, considering that the helmer get himself into a mess from which he emerges well and on his own feet, highlighting a script full of smart cheats.

== Accolades ==
Year	Award	Category	Nominee(s)	Result	Ref.
2004	7th Málaga Film Festival	Best Director	Vicente Peñarrocha	Won	
2004	7th Málaga Film Festival	Best Screenplay	Vicente Peñarrocha	Won	
2005	19th Goya Awards	Best New Director	Vicente Peñarrocha	Nominated	

== See also ==
- List of Spanish films of 2004
