= Astronauts (film) =

- Theatrical release poster
- Spanish: Astronautas
- Directed by: Santi Amodeo
- Screenplay by: Santi Amodeo
- Starring: Nancho Novo; Teresa Hurtado; Juan Motilla; Alex O'Dogherty; Jöns Pappila; Manolo Solo; Juanma Lara; Enrico Vecchi; Julián Villagrán
- Cinematography: Alex Catalán
- Edited by: J. Manuel G. Moyano
- Music by: Lavadora
- Production companies: Tesela PC; La Zanfoña Producciones
- Distributed by: Alta Classics
- Release dates: 27 October 2003 (Seminci); 5 March 2004 (Spain)
- Country: Spain
- Language: Spanish
- Budget: €1.6 million

Astronauts (Spanish: Astronautas) is a 2003 Spanish film written and directed by Santi Amodeo which stars Nancho Novo and Teresa Hurtado de Ory. It could be classified as a bittersweet comedy.

== Plot ==
The plot tracks the (im)possible relationship between Daniel (a misanthrope and recovering heroin abuser) and Laura (a teenager without a family who, initially bemused, ends up trying to fix Daniel's life).

== Cast ==
- Nancho Novo as Daniel
- Teresa Hurtado as Laura
- Juan Motilla
- Alex O'Dogherty as Torta
- Jöns Pappila
- Manolo Solo as Lorenzo
- Juanma Lara
- Enrico Vecchi
- Julián Villagrán as Andrés

== Production ==
Astronauts is the solo debut feature of Santi Amodeo, who had previously co-helmed The Pilgrim Factor in tandem with Alberto Rodríguez. A Tesela PC and La Zanfoña production, it had the collaboration of Canal Sur and Canal+. In addition to Seville, shooting locations also included Los Alcornocales and the port of San Fernando. The film boasted a budget of around €1.6 million.

== Release ==
The film was presented at the 48th Valladolid International Film Festival (Seminci) in October 2003. Distributed by Alta Classics, the film was theatrically released in Spain on 5 March 2004.

== Reception ==
Casimiro Torreiro of El País deemed Astronauts to be "a film to be loved", "a rara avis of those that, with its flaws and imperfections, we wish we could watch more often".

Jonathan Holland of Variety deemed the film to be an "unpolished gem whose freshness and originality far outweigh its occasional indulgences".

== Accolades ==
| Year | Award | Category | Nominee(s) | Result | Ref. |
|---|---|---|---|---|---|
| 2005 | 19th Goya Awards | Best New Director | Santi Amodeo | Nominated | |
| 2005 | 19th Goya Awards | Best New Actress | Teresa Hurtado de Ory | Nominated | |

== See also ==
- List of Spanish films of 2004
