= Bad Women =

2001 film by Fabio Conversi

- Malefemmene
- Directed by: Fabio Conversi
- Written by: Anna Pavignano; Gioia Scola
- Produced by: Gioia Scola
- Starring: Giovanna Mezzogiorno; Ángela Molina; Ana Fernández
- Cinematography: Maurizio Calvesi
- Edited by: Massimo Fiocchi
- Music by: Carlo Crivelli
- Distributed by: Medusa Film
- Release date: 2001
- Country: Italy
- Language: Italian

Bad Women (Neapolitan: Malefemmene) is a 2001 Italian prison-drama film directed by Fabio Conversi.

== Cast ==
- Giovanna Mezzogiorno as Francesca
- Ángela Molina as Nunzia
- Ana Fernández as Candela
- Sabina Began as Patrizia
- Rosa Pianeta as Botti
- Federica Bonavolontà as Cettina
- Paola Fulciniti as Fortezza
- Pina Cutolo as Rosa
