= Things That Make Living Worthwhile =

2004 film by Manuel Gómez Pereira

- Theatrical release poster
- Spanish: Cosas que hacen que la vida valga la pena
- Directed by: Manuel Gómez Pereira
- Written by: Joaquín Oristrell; Yolanda García Serrano; Carlos Molinero; Luis Piedrahita
- Produced by: César Benítez
- Starring: Ana Belén; Eduard Fernández; María Pujalte
- Cinematography: Juan Amorós
- Edited by: José Salcedo
- Music by: Binguen Mendizábal
- Production company: BocaBoca Producciones
- Distributed by: Columbia TriStar Spain
- Release dates: 26 April 2004 (Málaga Film Festival); 26 November 2004 (Spain)
- Running time: 90 minutes
- Country: Spain
- Language: Spanish

Things That Make Living Worthwhile (Spanish: Cosas que hacen que la vida valga la pena) is a 2004 Spanish romantic comedy-drama film directed by Manuel Gómez Pereira, starring Ana Belén and Eduard Fernández.

== Plot ==
The plot features the relationship between Hortensia, a divorced woman working as a civil officer at the INEM, and Jorge, an also divorced unemployed man and recovering alcoholic.

== Cast ==
- Ana Belén as Hortensia
- Eduard Fernández as Jorge
- María Pujalte as Ángeles
- José Sacristán as Juan
- Rosario Pardo as América
- Zoe Berriatúa as Estudiante de la autoescuela
- Carlos Wu as Chen
- Carmen Balagué as Farmacéutica
- Raúl Arévalo as Vendedor
- Fernando Colomo
- Carlos Kaniowsky

== Production ==
The film was directed by Manuel Gómez Pereira whereas the screenplay was penned by Joaquín Oristrell, Yolanda García Serrano, Carlos Molinero and Luis Piedrahita. It was produced by BocaBoca Producciones with the participation of TVE and Canal+.

== Release ==
The film screened at the 7th Málaga Spanish Film Festival (FMCE) in 2004. Distributed by Columbia Tristar Spain, the film was theatrically released in Spain on 26 November 2004.

== Reception ==
Jonathan Holland of Variety deemed the film be "an enjoyable, adult-oriented comedy romancer beefed up by a thought-provoking darker side".

Mirito Torreiro of Fotogramas gave it 4 out of 5 stars highlighting the chemistry between the leads to be the best about the film.

== Accolades ==
Year	Award	Category	Nominee(s)	Result	Ref.
2004	7th Málaga Spanish Film Festival	Public Choice Award		Won	
2005	19th Goya Awards	Best Actor	Eduard Fernández	Nominated	
2005	19th Goya Awards	Best Actress	Ana Belén	Nominated	
2005	14th Actors and Actresses Union Awards	Best Film Actor in a Leading Role	Eduard Fernández	Nominated	
2005	14th Actors and Actresses Union Awards	Best Film Actress in a Leading Role	Ana Belén	Nominated	

== See also ==
- List of Spanish films of 2004
