= Voices in the Night (film) =

- Theatrical release poster
- Directed by: Salvador García Ruiz
- Screenplay by: Salvador García Ruiz
- Based on: Voices in the Evening by Natalia Ginzburg
- Starring: Tristán Ulloa; Laia Marull; Vicky Peña; Paloma Paso Jardiel; Ana Wagener; Ramón Madaula; Emma Vilarasau; Malena Alterio; Juli Mira; Pepa Zaragoza; Pere Arquillué; Guillermo Toledo; Álvaro de Luna
- Cinematography: Teo Delgado
- Edited by: Carmen Frías
- Music by: Pascal Gaigne
- Production companies: DeAPlaneta; Esicma; Mikado
- Distributed by: Columbia TriStar
- Release dates: October 2003 (Seminci); 27 February 2004 (Spain)
- Countries: Spain; Italy
- Language: Spanish

Voices in the Night (Spanish: Las voces de la noche) is a 2003 Spanish-Italian romantic drama film written and directed by Salvador García Ruiz based on the 1963 novel Voices in the Evening by Natalia Ginzburg. Ruiz relocates the setting from an Italian village to a Spanish one, but keeps the setting in the 1950s. The main roles are played by Laia Marull, Tristán Ulloa, and Vicky Peña.

== Cast ==
- Tristán Ulloa as Jorge
- Laia Marull as Elisa
- Vicky Peña
- Paloma Paso Jardiel
- Ana Wagener
- Ramón Madaula
- Emma Vilarasau
- Malena Alterio
- Juli Mira
- Pepa Zaragoza
- Pere Arquillué as Pepe
- Guillermo Toledo
- Álvaro de Luna

== Production ==
A Spanish-Italian co-production by DeAPlaneta, Esicma, and Mikado, the film also had the participation of Antena 3, Canal+, and TVC. Shooting locations included the province of Girona.

== Release ==
The film screened at the 48th Valladolid International Film Festival (Seminci) in October 2003. Distributed by Columbia TriStar, it was theatrically released in Spain on 27 February 2004.

== Reception ==
Jonathan Holland of Variety deemed the film to "a well-dressed, if over-earnest, romancer", "otherwise solidly built, well-played".

Nuria Vidal of Fotogramas rated the film 4 out of 5 stars, highlighting the performance by Marull as the best thing about the film.

Casimiro Torreiro of El País deemed Voices in the Night to be a "glossy, evocative and rigorous provincial drama".

== Accolades ==
Year	Award	Category	Nominee(s)	Result	Ref.
2005	19th Goya Awards	Best Adapted Screenplay	Salvador García Ruiz	Nominated	

== See also ==
- List of Spanish films of 2004
