= Isi-Disi, Rough Love =

- Theatrical release poster
- Spanish: Isi/Disi: Amor a lo bestia
- Directed by: Chema de la Peña
- Screenplay by: Joaquín Górriz; Miguel Ángel Fernández
- Produced by: Andrés Vicente Gómez
- Starring: Santiago Segura; Jaydy Michel; Florentino Fernández; Ana Risueño; Miguel Ángel Rodríguez "El Sevilla"; Manolo de Vega; José Luis Coll; Ruth Zanon; Elia Galera; Eduardo Gómez; Gran Wyoming; Máximo Valverde; Miriam Díaz Aroca; Joaquín Sabina
- Cinematography: Unax Mendía
- Edited by: Antonio Lara
- Music by: Roque Baños
- Production companies: Lolafilms; MTV Films Europe; Intuition Films
- Distributed by: United International Pictures
- Release date: 23 July 2004
- Country: Spain
- Language: Spanish

Isi-Disi, Rough Love (Spanish: Isi/Disi: Amor a lo bestia) is a 2004 Spanish comedy film directed by Chema de la Peña from a screenplay by Joaquín Górriz and Miguel Ángel Fernández which stars Santiago Segura, Jaydy Michel, and Florentino Fernández.

== Plot ==
The plot follows the implementation of courtship mechanisms by kalimotxo-loving metalhead friends from Leganés (Isi and Disi) with beautiful and posh Joaquín Sabina-loving Mexican university student Vanessa.

== Cast ==
- Santiago Segura as Isi
- Jaydy Michel as Vane
- Florentino Fernández as Disi
- Ana Risueño
- Miguel Ángel Rodríguez "El Sevilla" as Pota
- Manolo de Vega as Eugenio
- José Luis Coll
- Ruth Zanon as Kuki
- Elia Galera
- Eduardo Gómez
- Gran Wyoming
- Máximo Valverde
- Miriam Díaz Aroca
- Joaquín Sabina

== Production ==
The film was produced by Lolafilms and MTV Films Europe in association with Intuition Films, and it had the participation of TVE and Canal+. It boasted a €3.6 million budget.

== Release ==
Distributed by United International Pictures (UIP), the film was released theatrically in Spain on 23 July 2004. It was the second largest-grossing Spanish film at the domestic box office in 2004.

== Reception ==
Casimiro Torreiro of El País warned that "its coarse comic tone, its gutted humor, and its textbook patriarchalism make this film strictly inadvisable for sensible spirits".

Jonathan Holland of Variety assessed that the "desperately unimaginative script is compensated for by cast's obvious determination to have a good time and thesps' marquee power".

== Accolades ==
Year	Award	Category	Nominee(s)	Result	Ref.
2005	19th Goya Awards	Best Sound	Antonio Rodríguez "Mármol", Nacho Royo Villanova, Patrick Ghislain	Nominated	
2005	19th Goya Awards	Best Original Song	"La rubia de la cuarta fila" by Joaquín Sabina	Nominated	

== See also ==
- List of Spanish films of 2004
