= The Sea Inside =

2004 Spanish drama film

- Theatrical poster by Toni Galingo.
- Directed by: Alejandro Amenábar
- Written by: Alejandro Amenábar; Mateo Gil
- Produced by: Alejandro Amenábar; Fernando Bovaira
- Starring: Javier Bardem; Belén Rueda; Lola Dueñas; Mabel Rivera; Celso Bugallo
- Cinematography: Javier Aguirresarobe
- Edited by: Alejandro Amenábar
- Music by: Alejandro Amenábar
- Production companies: Sogepaq; UGC Images; Eyescreen
- Distributed by: Warner Sogefilms (Spain); UGC Fox Distribution (France); Lucky Red (Italy)
- Release date: 3 September 2004
- Running time: 125 minutes
- Countries: Spain; France; Italy
- Languages: Spanish; Galician; Catalan
- Budget: €10 million
- Box office: $43.7 million

The Sea Inside (Spanish: Mar adentro) is a 2004 psychological drama film co-written and directed by Alejandro Amenábar, who also co-produced, scored and edited. It is based on the real-life story of Ramón Sampedro (played by Javier Bardem), who was left quadriplegic after a diving accident, and his 28-year campaign in support of euthanasia and the right to end his life. The film won the Academy Award for Best Foreign Language Film and won the Grand Jury Prize at the 61st Venice International Film Festival.

== Plot ==
This is the life story of Spaniard Ramón Sampedro, who fought a 28-year campaign to win the right to end his own life with assisted suicide. The film explores Ramón's relationships with two women: Julia, a lawyer suffering from Cadasil syndrome who supports his cause, and Rosa, a local woman who wants to convince him that his life is worth living. Through the gift of his love, these two women are inspired to accomplish things they never previously thought possible.

Ramón, now 54 years old, has been fighting for 26 years for his right to die following a diving incident which left him paralysed from the neck down. He is unable to end his life by himself and does not wish to implicate his family or friends, as by Spanish law, they would be charged with murder or assisting a suicide. Following the death of his mother, he is cared for by his sister-in-law, Manuela. Ramón's elder brother José does not believe he should have the right to die; both Manuela and her son, Javier, believe in his case.

Ramón's friend Gené, who works for an organization fighting for the right to die, puts him in contact with Julia, a lawyer. As she seeks to learn more about him and his situation in order to fight for his cause, he recounts his past and his reasons for wanting to die: He says that there is no dignity in living paralysed. After seeing his story online, Rosa visits Ramón to convince him to live. He demands that she respect his wishes and she leaves, upset. Later, whilst DJing her part-time radio show, she apologises on air in the hopes that he is listening. She continues to visit, bringing her children, and the two strike up a friendship. Despite romantic interest in both women, Ramón maintains that he is spoken for by death.

Julia reads Ramón's memoir describing his life and experiences as a quadriplegic and urges him to publish it. He imagines flying from his bed to visit her on the beach. Later, she is hospitalised with a stroke and admitted to rehab to relearn how to walk. The two write letters to each other, sending updates of their lives. Ramón loses a court case for his right to die. Rosa, in tears, appears at his house and Ramón admits that he has planned a way to commit suicide without the direct and obvious involvement of anyone else.

Meanwhile, Padre Francisco, a quadriplegic Catholic priest, comes to convince Ramón to want to live. Ramón refuses to be carried downstairs and so the two men converse through the help of a church boy, who runs up and down to share their arguments. Angry and upset, Manuela asks him to leave. Julia visits to assist Ramón in writing his memoir whilst his family and friends discuss his right to die. Divided, they fight. But Ramón is unwavering in his wish. Again, he imagines that he is able-bodied, kissing Julia. Later, she admits that her condition will only become more severe and that she is planning to kill herself. But first, she would like to help Ramón.

Ramón and Javier work together to design and build a wheelchair for him in which he can appear in court to fight for his own right to die. His appeal is ultimately rejected, but Ramón eventually fulfils his wish nonetheless. Each of his friends and family complete a small action in his death; not enough to convict any of them of his murder or assisting his suicide. He records himself on a video camera, narrating his own death, before ingesting a cyanide-laced drink that kills him.

== Cast ==
=== Sampedro family ===
- Javier Bardem as Ramón Sampedro
- Celso Bugallo as José Sampedro, Ramón's elder brother
- Mabel Rivera as Manuela, José's wife and Ramón's caregiver
- Tamar Novas as Javier Sampedro, Ramón's nephew
- Joan Dalmau as Joaquín Sampedro, Ramón and José's father

=== Ramon's friends ===
- Belén Rueda as Julia
- Alberto Jiménez as Germán, Julia's husband
- Lola Dueñas as Rosa
- Nicolás Fernández Luna as Cristian, Rosa's elder son
- Raúl Lavisier as Samuel, her younger son
- Clara Segura as Gené
- Francesc Garrido as Marc, Gené's husband

=== Others ===
- Josep Maria Pou as Padre Francisco, a quadriplegic Catholic priest
- Alberto Amarilla as Hermano Andrés
- Andrea Occhipinti as Santiago
- Federico Pérez Rey as Conductor (Driver)
- Xosé Manuel Olveira as Juez 1 (Judge 1)
- César Cambeiro as Juez 2
- Xosé Manuel Esperanto as Periodista 1 (Reporter 1)
- Yolanda Muiños as Periodista 2
- Adolfo Obregón as Ejecutivo (Executive)
- José Luis Rodríguez as Presentador (TV host)
- Julio Jordán as Encuadernador (Bookbinder)
- Juan Manuel Vidal as Amigo Ramón (Ramón's friend)
- Marta Larralde as Muchacha en la playa (Girl on beach)
- Jacob Ahlgren as himself (Baller)

== Reception ==
=== Critical response ===
The film received positive reviews from critics. It currently holds an 85% rating on Rotten Tomatoes based on 133 reviews, with an average rating of 7.6/10. Its consensus summary states: "Held aloft by a transfixing performance from Javier Bardem as a terminally ill man who chooses to die, The Sea Inside transcends its melodramatic story with tenderness and grace." Metacritic assigned the film a weighted average score of 74 out of 100, based on 38 critics, indicating "generally favorable reviews".

=== Accolades ===
| Award | Category | Nominee(s) | Result |
|---|---|---|---|
| Academy Awards | Best Foreign Language Film | Spain | Won |
| Academy Awards | Best Makeup | Jo Allen and Manolo García | Nominated |
| AARP Movies for Grownups Awards | Best Foreign Film | | Nominated |
| Actors and Actresses Union Awards | Leading Male Film Performance | Javier Bardem | Won |
| Actors and Actresses Union Awards | Secondary Male Film Performance | Celso Bugallo | Won |
| Actors and Actresses Union Awards | Secondary Female Film Performance | Lola Dueñas | Won |
| Actors and Actresses Union Awards | Secondary Female Film Performance | Mabel Rivera | Nominated |
| Actors and Actresses Union Awards | Minor Male Film Performance | Joan Dalmau | Nominated |
| Actors and Actresses Union Awards | Male Newcomer | Tamar Novas | Won |
| Actors and Actresses Union Awards | Female Newcomer | Belén Rueda | Won |
| ADIRCAE Awards | Best Performance in a Leading Role | Javier Bardem | Won |
| Argentine Film Critics Association Awards | Best Foreign Film, Spanish Language | | Won |
| Ariel Awards | Best Ibero-American Film | Alejandro Amenábar | Nominated |
| Awards Circuit Community Awards | Best Foreign Language Film | | Nominated |
| Bangkok International Film Festival | Best Film | Alejandro Amenábar | Won |
| Bangkok International Film Festival | Best Actor | Javier Bardem | Won |
| BBC Four World Cinema Awards | BBC Four World Cinema Award | | Nominated |
| Belgian Film Critics Association Awards | Grand Prix | Alejandro Amenábar | Nominated |
| Butaca Awards | Best Catalan Film Actor | Joan Dalmau | Nominated |
| Camerimage | Golden Frog | Javier Aguirresarobe | Nominated |
| Canadian Network of Makeup Artists Awards | Best International Make-Up for a Feature Film | Jo Allen | Won |
| César Awards | Best Foreign Film | Alejandro Amenábar | Nominated |
| Cinema Brazil Grand Prize | Best Foreign Language Film | | Nominated |
| Cinema Writers Circle Awards | Best Film | | Nominated |
| Cinema Writers Circle Awards | Best Director | Alejandro Amenábar | Nominated |
| Cinema Writers Circle Awards | Best Actor | Javier Bardem | Won |
| Cinema Writers Circle Awards | Best Supporting Actor | Celso Bugallo | Nominated |
| Cinema Writers Circle Awards | Best Supporting Actress | Lola Dueñas | Won |
| Cinema Writers Circle Awards | Best Supporting Actress | Mabel Rivera | Nominated |
| Cinema Writers Circle Awards | Best Screenplay – Original | Alejandro Amenábar and Mateo Gil | Nominated |
| Cinema Writers Circle Awards | Best Cinematography | Javier Aguirresarobe | Won |
| Cinema Writers Circle Awards | Best Editing | Alejandro Amenábar | Nominated |
| Cinema Writers Circle Awards | Best Score | Alejandro Amenábar | Nominated |
| Cinema Writers Circle Awards | Best New Artist | Belén Rueda | Won |
| CinEuphoria Awards | Top Films of the Decade – International Competition | Alejandro Amenábar | Won |
| Cinéfest Sudbury International Film Festival | Audience Choice Award | Alejandro Amenábar | Won |
| Critics' Choice Movie Awards | Best Foreign Language Film | | Won |
| Critics' Choice Movie Awards | Best Actor | Javier Bardem | Nominated |
| David di Donatello Awards | Best European Film | Alejandro Amenábar | Won |
| European Film Awards | European Film | Alejandro Amenábar and Fernando Bovaira | Nominated |
| European Film Awards | European Director | Alejandro Amenábar | Won |
| European Film Awards | European Actor | Javier Bardem | Won |
| European Film Awards | European Screenwriter | Alejandro Amenábar and Mateo Gil | Nominated |
| European Film Awards | European Cinematographer | Javier Aguirresarobe | Nominated |
| Film Critics Circle of Australia Awards | Best Foreign Language Film | | Won |
| Forqué Awards | Best Film | | Won |
| Fotogramas de Plata | Best Spanish Film | Alejandro Amenábar | Won |
| Fotogramas de Plata | Best Movie Actor | Javier Bardem | Won |
| Fotogramas de Plata | Best Movie Actress | Belén Rueda | Won |
| Gold Derby Awards | Best Foreign Language Film | | Nominated |
| Golden Globe Awards | Best Foreign Language Film | | Won |
| Golden Globe Awards | Best Actor in a Motion Picture – Drama | Javier Bardem | Nominated |
| Goya Awards | Best Film | | Won |
| Goya Awards | Best Director | Alejandro Amenábar | Won |
| Goya Awards | Best Actor | Javier Bardem | Won |
| Goya Awards | Best Actress | Lola Dueñas | Won |
| Goya Awards | Best Supporting Actor | Celso Bugallo | Won |
| Goya Awards | Best Supporting Actress | Mabel Rivera | Won |
| Goya Awards | Best Original Screenplay | Alejandro Amenábar and Mateo Gil | Won |
| Goya Awards | Best New Actor | Tamar Novas | Won |
| Goya Awards | Best New Actress | Belén Rueda | Won |
| Goya Awards | Best Art Direction | Benjamín Fernández | Nominated |
| Goya Awards | Best Cinematography | Javier Aguirresarobe | Won |
| Goya Awards | Best Makeup and Hairstyles | Jo Allen, Mara Collazo, Manolo García and Ana López Puigcerver | Won |
| Goya Awards | Best Original Score | Alejandro Amenábar | Won |
| Goya Awards | Best Production Direction | Emiliano Otegui | Won |
| Goya Awards | Best Sound | Ricardo Steinberg, Alfonso Raposo, Juan Ferro and María Steinberg | Won |
| Guild of German Art House Cinemas Awards | Best Foreign Film | Alejandro Amenábar | Won |
| Hollywood Film Awards | Hollywood European Award | Alejandro Amenábar | Won |
| Independent Spirit Awards | Best Foreign Language Film | | Won |
| Italian Online Movie Awards | Best Actor | Javier Bardem | Nominated |
| Italian Online Movie Awards | Best Makeup | | Nominated |
| Latin ACE Awards | Cinema – Best Film | | Won |
| Latin ACE Awards | Cinema – Best Director | Alejandro Amenábar | Nominated |
| Latin ACE Awards | Cinema – Best Actor | Javier Bardem | Nominated |
| Latin ACE Awards | Cinema – Best Actress | Belén Rueda | Nominated |
| Latin ACE Awards | Cinema – Best Supporting Actor | Celso Bugallo | Nominated |
| Latin ACE Awards | Cinema – Best Supporting Actress | Lola Dueñas | Won |
| Latin ACE Awards | Cinema – Best Supporting Actress | Mabel Rivera | Nominated |
| London Film Critics Circle Awards | Foreign Language Film of the Year | | Nominated |
| Nantes Spanish Film Festival | Audience Award | Alejandro Amenábar | Won |
| National Board of Review Awards | Top Foreign Films | | Won |
| National Board of Review Awards | Best Foreign Language Film | | Won |
| Ondas Awards | Cinemanía Award | Alejandro Amenábar | Won |
| Palm Springs International Film Festival | Best Narrative Feature | Alejandro Amenábar | Won |
| Russian National Movie Awards | Best Independent Movie | Alejandro Amenábar | Nominated |
| San Diego Film Critics Society Awards | Best Foreign Language Film | | Won |
| Sant Jordi Awards | Best Film | Alejandro Amenábar | Won |
| Sant Jordi Awards | Best Spanish Film | Alejandro Amenábar | Won |
| Sant Jordi Awards | Best Spanish Actor | Javier Bardem | Won |
| Sant Jordi Awards | Best Spanish Actress | Mabel Rivera | Won |
| Satellite Awards | Best Foreign Language Film | | Won |
| Satellite Awards | Best Actor in a Motion Picture – Drama | Javier Bardem | Nominated |
| SESC Film Festival | Best Foreign Actor | Javier Bardem | Won |
| Sofia International Film Festival | Audience Award | Alejandro Amenábar | Won |
| Sofia International Film Festival | Audience Award 'Silver Sea-Gull' | Alejandro Amenábar | Won |
| Spanish Music Awards | Best Score | Alejandro Amenábar | Won |
| Turia Awards | Best Spanish Film | Alejandro Amenábar | Won |
| Turkish Film Critics Association Awards | Best Foreign Film | | 9th Place |
| Utah Film Critics Association Awards | Best Foreign Language Film | | Won |
| Venice International Film Festival | Golden Lion | Alejandro Amenábar | Nominated |
| Venice International Film Festival | Grand Jury Prize | Alejandro Amenábar | Won |
| Venice International Film Festival | Best International Film | Alejandro Amenábar | Won |
| Venice International Film Festival | Best Actor | Javier Bardem | Won |
| World Soundtrack Awards | Best Original Score of the Year | Alejandro Amenábar | Nominated |
| Yoga Awards | Worst Spanish Score | Alejandro Amenábar | Won |

== See also ==
- List of Spanish films of 2004
- List of submissions to the 77th Academy Awards for Best Foreign Language Film
- List of Spanish submissions for the Academy Award for Best Foreign Language Film
- Whose Life Is It Anyway? (1981)
