= Elia Galera =

Spanish actress and television presenter

- Galera in 2026
- Born: 19 March 1973 (age 53); Madrid, Spain
- Occupations: Actress; television presenter

Elia Galera (born 19 March 1973) is a Spanish actress and television presenter.

== Life and career ==
Galera was born in Madrid on 19 March 1973. She earned a licentiate degree in law, but she began an acting career instead, training at the Juan Carlos Corazza acting school. Galera made her feature film debut in The Ugliest Woman in the World (1999). She became popular to a television audience for her role as Claudia Castilla in Hospital Central (2006−2011).

As a television presenter, also on Telecinco, she became popular as co-anchor of the Popstars contest, alongside Jesús Vázquez in 2002.

== Filmography ==
=== Films ===
Year	Title	Role	Notes	Ref.
1999	La mujer más fea del mundo (The Ugliest Woman in the World)	Lola Otero		
2001	Sin noticias de Dios			
2004	El séptimo día			
2004	Héctor	Sofía		
2004	Isi/Disi. Amor a lo bestia			
2004	Fuera del cuerpo (Body Confusion)	Esther		
2021	Pan de limón con semillas de amapola (Lemon and Poppy Seed Cake)	Marina		

==== Television ====
- La corriente alterna
- Capital (2004)
- El pasado es mañana (2005)
- Hospital Central, as Claudia Castilla (2006-2011)
- La Baronesa, Como Paula (2011)
- Frágiles, as Teresa González (Telecinco, 2012-2013)
- El Príncipe, as Raquel (Telecinco, 2014–present)
- El Cid, as Queen Sancha (Amazon Prime, 2018-2020)
- Acacias 38, as Silvia Reyes

=== T.V. presenter ===
- 100% cine (2000)
- Popstars (2002)
