= The Year of the Flood (film) =

- Theatrical release poster
- Spanish: El año del diluvio
- Directed by: Jaime Chávarri
- Screenplay by: Eduardo Mendoza; Jaime Chávarri
- Based on: El año del diluvio by Eduardo Mendoza
- Starring: Fanny Ardant; Darío Grandinetti; Ginés García Millán; Eloy Azorín; Pepa López; Francesc Orella; Sandra de Falco; Rosa Novell; Francis Lorenzo
- Cinematography: Jaume Paracaula
- Music by: Carles Cases
- Production companies: GONA; Oberon Cinematográfica; Babe; Kairòs
- Distributed by: United International Pictures (es)
- Release dates: 24 April 2004 (Málaga); 28 April 2004 (Spain)
- Countries: Spain; France; Italy
- Language: Spanish

The Year of the Flood (Spanish: El año del diluvio) is a 2004 romantic drama film directed by Jaime Chávarri based on the novel of the same name by Eduardo Mendoza which stars Fanny Ardant and Darío Grandinetti.

== Plot ==
Set in a Catalan village in 1953, the plot follows the romantic relationship between Sor Consuelo, a nun, and Don Augusto Aixelá, a womanizing local landholder. The entry of the Maquis guerrilla on the scene disrupts the plight of Consuelo.

== Cast ==
- Fanny Ardant as Sor Consuelo (Note: Dubbed in the Spanish-language track by Mercedes Sampietro.)
- Darío Grandinetti as Don Augusto Aixelá
- Ginés García Millán as Balaguer
- Eloy Azorín as Bartolo
- Pepa López
- Francesc Orella as Sgt. Lastre
- Sandra De Falco
- Rosa Novell
- Francis Lorenzo

== Production ==
A joint Spanish-French-Italian co-production, the film was produced by GONA alongside Oberon Cinematográfica, Babe and Kairòs. Shooting began on 11 August 2003 and wrapped in October 2003. Shooting locations included Barcelona and neighbouring villages.

== Release ==
Penned by Eduardo Mendoza and Jaime Chávarri, the screenplay is an adaptation of the 1992 novel of the same name authored by the former. The film screened in April 2004 at the Málaga Film Festival's main competition. Distributed by United International Pictures, it was theatrically released in Spain on 28 April 2004.

== Accolades ==
Year	Award	Category	Nominee(s)	Result	Ref.
2005	19th Goya Awards	Best Adapted Screenplay	Eduardo Mendoza, Jaime Chávarri	Nominated	

== See also ==
- List of Spanish films of 2004
