= Goya Award for Best Editing =

Annual award by the Spanish Film Academy

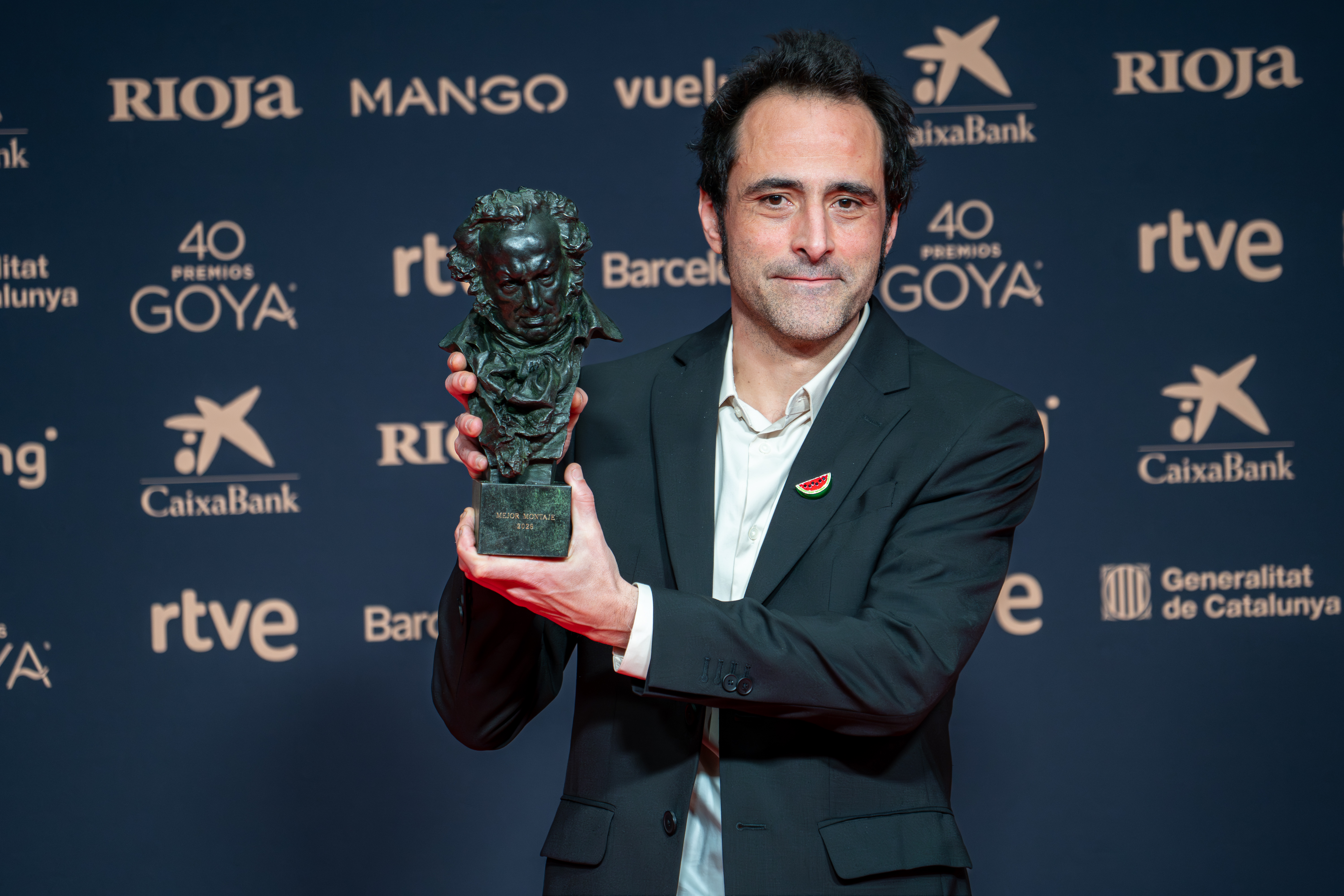
- The 2026 recipient: Cristóbal Fernández
- Native name: Premio Goya al mejor montaje
- Awarded for: Best editing in a Spanish film of the year
- Country: Spain
- Presented by: Academy of Cinematographic Arts and Sciences of Spain (AACCE)
- First award: 1st Goya Awards (1986)
- Most recent winner: Cristóbal Fernández; Sirāt (2025)
- Website: Official website

The Goya Award for Best Editing (Premio Goya al mejor montaje) is one of the Goya Awards presented annually by the Academy of Cinematographic Arts and Sciences of Spain (AACCE) since the awards debuted in 1986.

Film editors that have won multiple times are José Salcedo, Pablo González del Amo and Pablo Blanco Somoza, with three wins each.

== Winners and nominees ==
=== 1980s ===
Year	English title	Original title	Recipient(s)
1986 (1st)	Banter		Eduardo Biurrun
1986 (1st)	Voyage to Nowhere	El viaje a ninguna parte	Pablo del Amo
1986 (1st)	Werther		José Luis Matesanz
1987 (2nd)	Divinas palabras		Pablo González del Amo
1987 (2nd)	Hostages in the Barrio	La estanquera de Vallecas	Julio Peña
1987 (2nd)	Mi general		José Luis Matesanz
1988 (3rd)	Women on the Verge of a Nervous Breakdown	Mujeres al borde de un ataque de nervios	José Salcedo
1988 (3rd)	Berlín Blues		Teresa Font
1988 (3rd)	Baton Rouge		José Salcedo
1988 (3rd)	Rowing with the Wind	Remando al viento	José Salcedo
1988 (3rd)	El Dorado		Pedro del Rey
1989 (4th)	Twisted Obsession	El sueño del mono loco	Carmen Frías
1989 (4th)	The Sea and the Weather	El mar y el tiempo	Pablo González del Amo
1989 (4th)	Esquilache		Pablo González del Amo
1989 (4th)	Moon Child	El niños de la luna	Raúl Román
1989 (4th)	The Dark Night	La noche oscura	Pedro del Rey
1989 (4th)	Love, Hate and Death	Montoyas y Tarantos	José Antonio Rojo

=== 1990s ===
Year	English title	Original title	Recipient(s)
1990 (5th)	¡Ay Carmela!		Pablo González del Amo
1990 (5th)	Tie Me Up! Tie Me Down!	¡Átame!	José Salcedo
1990 (5th)	Letters from Alou	Las cartas de Alou	Rori Sáinz de Rozas
1991 (6th)	Prince of Shadows	Beltenebros	José Luis Matesanz
1991 (6th)	Lovers	Amantes	Teresa Font
1991 (6th)	High Heels	Tacones lejanos	José Salcedo
1992 (7th)	Belle Époque		Carmen Frías
1992 (7th)	The Fencing Master	El maestro de esgrima	José Salcedo
1992 (7th)	Acción mutante		Pablo Blanco
1993 (8th)	Banderas, the Tyrant	Tirano Banderas	Pablo González del Amo
1993 (8th)	Intruder	Intruso	Teresa Font
1993 (8th)	La madre muerta		Pablo Blanco
1994 (9th)	Running Out of Time	Días contados	Teresa Font
1994 (9th)	El detective y la muerte		José Salcedo
1994 (9th)	Cradle Song	Canción de cuna	Miguel González Sinde
1995 (10th)	Nobody Will Speak of Us When We're Dead	Nadie hablará de nosotras cuando hayamos muerto	José Salcedo
1995 (10th)	Mouth to Mouth	Boca a boca	Guillermo Represa
1995 (10th)	The Day of the Beast	El día de la bestia	Teresa Font
1996 (11th)	Tesis		María Elena Sainz de Rozas
1996 (11th)	Asaltar los cielos		Fidel Collados and Pablo Blanco
1996 (11th)	The Dog in the Manger	El perro del hortelano	Pablo del Amo
1997 (12th)	Airbag		Pablo Blanco
1997 (12th)	The Color of the Clouds	El color de las nubes	José María Biurrun
1997 (12th)	Secrets of the Heart	Secretos del corazón	Rori Sáinz de Rozas
1998 (13th)	Lovers of the Arctic Circle	Los amantes del círculo polar	Iván Aledo
1998 (13th)	Open Your Eyes	Abre los ojos	María Elena Sáinz de Rozas
1998 (13th)	The Grandfather	El abuelo	Miguel González Sinde
1998 (13th)	The Girl of Your Dreams	La niña de tus ojos	Carmen Frías
1999 (14th)	All About My Mother	Todo sobre mi madre	José Salcedo
1999 (14th)	Goya in Bordeaux	Goya en Burdeos	Julia Juániz
1999 (14th)	Butterfly's Tongue	La lengua de las mariposas	Nacho Ruiz Capillas
1999 (14th)	Solas		Fernando Pardo

=== 2000s ===
Year	English title	Original title	Recipient(s)
2000 (15th)	You're the One	You're the One (una historia de entonces)	Miguel González Sinde
2000 (15th)	Calle 54		Carmen Frías
2000 (15th)	Common Wealth	La comunidad	Alejandro Lázaro
2000 (15th)	Leo		José Salcedo
2001 (16th)	The Others	Los otros	Nacho Ruiz Capillas
2001 (16th)	Mad Love	Juana la Loca	Teresa Font
2001 (16th)	Sex and Lucia	Lucía y el sexo	Iván Aledo
2001 (16th)	Don't Tempt Me	Sin noticias de Dios	José Salcedo
2002 (17th)	Box 507	La caja 507	Ángel Hernández Zoido
2002 (17th)	800 Bullets	800 balas	Alejandro Lázaro
2002 (17th)	Aro Tolbukhin. En la mente del asesino		Ernest Blasi
2002 (17th)	Mondays in the Sun	Los lunes al sol	Nacho Ruiz Capillas
2003 (18th)	Mortadelo & Filemon: The Big Adventure	La gran aventura de Mortadelo y Filemón	Iván Aledo
2003 (18th)	Carmen		Teresa Font
2003 (18th)	Football Days	Días de fútbol	Rori Sáinz de Rozas
2003 (18th)	Take My Eyes	Te doy mis ojos	Ángel Hernández Zoido
2004 (19th)	The Wolf	El Lobo	Guillermo Maldonado
2004 (19th)	Cold Winter Sun	Frío sol de invierno	Antonio Pérez Reina
2004 (19th)	Hours of Light	Horas de luz	José María Biurrun
2004 (19th)	Swindled	Incautos	Iván Aledo
2005 (20th)	Habana Blues		Fernando Pardo
2005 (20th)	The Method	El método	Iván Aledo
2005 (20th)	Iberia		Julia Juániz
2005 (20th)	Ninette		Miguel González Sinde
2006 (21st)	Pan's Labyrinth	El laberinto del fauno	Bernat Villaplana
2006 (21st)	Alatriste		José Salcedo
2006 (21st)	The Borgia	Los Borgia	Iván Aledo
2006 (21st)	Salvador (Puig Antich)		Aixalà y Santy Borricón
2007 (22nd)	[•REC]		David Gallart
2007 (22nd)	The Orphanage	El orfanato	Elena Ruiz
2007 (22nd)	13 Roses	Las 13 rosas	Fernando Pardo
2007 (22nd)	Seven Billiard Tables	Siete mesas de billar francés	Nacho Ruiz Capillas
2008 (23rd)	The Oxford Murders	Los crímenes de Oxford	Alejandro Lázaro
2008 (23rd)	The Blind Sunflowers	Los girasoles ciegos	Nacho Ruiz Capillas
2008 (23rd)	Mortadelo and Filemon. Mission: Save the Planet	Mortadelo y Filemón. Misión: salvar la Tierra	Iván Aledo
2008 (23rd)	Just Walking	Sólo quiero caminar	José Salcedo
2009 (24th)	Cell 211	Celda 211	Mapa Pastor
2009 (24th)	Ágora	Agora	Nacho Ruiz Capillas
2009 (24th)	The Dancer and the Thief	El baile de la Victoria	Carmen Frías
2009 (24th)	Fat People	Gordos	David Pinillos and Nacho Ruiz Capillas

=== 2010s ===
Year	English title	Original title	Recipient(s)
2010 (25th)	Buried	Buried (Enterrado)	Rodrigo Cortés
2010 (25th)	The Last Circus	Balada triste de trompeta	Alejandro Lázaro
2010 (25th)	Biutiful		Stephen Mirrione
2010 (25th)	Even the Rain	También la lluvia	Ángel Hernández Zoido
2011 (26th)	No Rest for the Wicked	No habrá paz para los malvados	Pablo Blanco
2011 (26th)	Blackthorn		David Gallarl
2011 (26th)	EVA		Elena Ruiz
2011 (26th)	The Skin I Live In	La piel que habito	José Salcedo
2012 (27th)	The Impossible	Lo impossible	Bernat Villaplana and Elena Ruiz
2012 (27th)	Blancanieves		Fernando Franco
2012 (27th)	The Artist and the Model	El artista y la modelo	Marta Velasco
2012 (27th)	Unit 7	Grupo 7	José M. G. Moyano
2012 (27th)	Invader	Invasor	Antonio Frutos and David Pinillos
2013 (28th)	Witching & Bitching	Las brujas de Zugarramurdi	Pablo Blanco
2013 (28th)	Three Many Weddings	3 bodas de más	Alberto de Toro
2013 (28th)	Family United	La gran familia española	Nacho Ruiz Capillas
2013 (28th)	Wounded	La herida	David Pinillos
2014 (29th)	Marshland	La isla mínima	José M. G. Moyano
2014 (29th)	El Niño		Mapa Pastor
2014 (29th)	Paco de Lucía: La búsqueda		José M. G. Moyano and Darío García
2014 (29th)	Wild Tales	Relatos salvajes	Damián Szifron and Pablo Barbieri
2015 (30th)	Retribution	El desconocido	Jorge Coira
2015 (30th)	Requirements to Be a Normal Person	Requisitos para ser una persona normal	David Gallart
2015 (30th)	Truman		Pablo Barbieri
2015 (30th)	A Perfect Day	Un día perfecto	Nacho Ruiz Capillas
2016 (31st)	A Monster Calls	Un monstruo viene a verme	Bernat Villaplana and Jaume Martí
2016 (31st)	Smoke & Mirrors	El hombre de las mil caras	José M. G. Moyano
2016 (31st)	May God Save Us	Que Dios nos perdone	Alberto del Campo and Fernando Franco
2016 (31st)	The Fury of a Patient Man	Tarde para la ira	Angel Fernández Zoido
2017 (32nd)	Giant	Handia	Laurent Dufreche and Raúl López
2017 (32nd)	Abracadabra		David Gallart
2017 (32nd)	Summer 1993	Estiu 1993	Ana Plaff and Didac Palao
2017 (32nd)	The Bookshop	La librería	Bernat Aragonés
2018 (33rd)	The Realm	El reino	Alberto del Campo
2018 (33rd)	Campeones	Campeones	Javier Fesser
2018 (33rd)	Todos lo saben	Todos lo saben	Hayedeh Safiyari
2018 (33rd)	Journey to a Mother's Room	Viaje al cuarto de una madre	Fernando Franco
2019 (34th)	Pain and Glory	Dolor y gloria	Teresa Font
2019 (34th)	The Endless Trench	La trinchera infinita	Laurent Dufreche and Raúl López
2019 (34th)	Mother	Madre	Alberto del Campo
2019 (34th)	While at War	Mientras dure la guerra	Carolina Martínez Urbina

=== 2020s ===
Year	English title	Original title	Recipient(s)
2020 (35th)	The Year of the Discovery	El año del descubrimiento	Sergio Jiménez
2020 (35th)	Adú		Jaime Colis
2020 (35th)	Black Beach		Fernando Franco and Miguel Doblado
2020 (35th)	Schoolgirls	Las niñas	Sofi Escudé
2021 (36th)	The Good Boss	El buen patrón	Vanessa L. Marimbert
2021 (36th)	Below Zero	Bajocero	Antonio Frutos
2021 (36th)	Josephine	Josefina	Miguel Doblado
2021 (36th)	Maixabel		Nacho Ruiz Capillas
2022 (37th)	The Beasts	As bestas	Alberto del Campo
2022 (37th)	Alcarràs		Ana Pfaff
2022 (37th)	Lullaby	Cinco lobitos	Andrés Gil
2022 (37th)	Prison 77	Modelo 77	José M. G. Moyano
2022 (37th)	One Year, One Night	Un año, una noche	Fernando Franco and Sergi Díes
2023 (38th)	Society of the Snow	La sociedad de la nieve	Andrés Gil, Jaume Martí
2023 (38th)	20,000 Species of Bees	20.000 especies de abejas	Raúl Barreras
2023 (38th)	Close Your Eyes	Cerrar los ojos	Ascen Marchena
2023 (38th)	Mamacruz		Fátima de los Santos
2023 (38th)	Robot Dreams		Fernando Franco
2024 (39th)	Saturn Return	Segundo premio	Javi Frutos
2024 (39th)	The 47	El 47	Nacho Ruiz Capillas
2024 (39th)	The Blue Star	La estrella azul	Javier Macipe, Nacho Blasco
2024 (39th)	Undercover	La infiltrada	Victoria Lammers
2024 (39th)	Little Loves	Los pequeños amores	Fernando Franco
2025 (40th)	Sirāt		Cristóbal Fernández
2025 (40th)	Sleepless City	Ciudad sin sueño	Victoria Lammers
2025 (40th)	Sundays	Los domingos	Andrés Gil
2025 (40th)	Los Tigres		José M. G. Moyano
2025 (40th)	She Walks in Darkness	Un fantasma en la batalla	Bernat Vilaplana

== Bibliography ==
- P. Granado, Verónica (2006). 20 Años de Goyas Al Cine Español. Aguilar. p. 444. ISBN 978-84-03-09688-2.
