= The Wolf (2004 film) =

Film by Miguel Courtois

- Theatrical release poster
- Spanish: El Lobo
- Directed by: Miguel Courtois
- Written by: Antonio Onetti
- Starring: Eduardo Noriega; José Coronado; Mélanie Doutey; José Coronado; Silvia Abascal; Santiago Ramos; Jorge Sanz
- Release date: 5 November 2004 (Spain)
- Running time: 134 minutes
- Country: Spain
- Language: Spanish

The Wolf (Spanish: El Lobo) is a 2004 Spanish drama biographical film directed by Miguel Courtois. It stars Eduardo Noriega as the title character and José Coronado alongside Mélanie Doutey, Silvia Abascal, Santiago Ramos, and Jorge Sanz.

== Plot ==
The film is based on the life of Mikel Lejarza (alias 'El Lobo'), an agent of the Spanish intelligence service in the early 1970s. During the last rales of the Francoist dictatorship, Lejarza infiltrated ETA, a paramilitary group seeking independence for the Basque Country.

He obstructed plans for a major prison breakout and a campaign of attacks. The secret services tried to demobilise him when he became less useful. However, he pursued his mission nevertheless, which became the most successful government initiative against ETA. Information he provided was responsible for the capture or killing of a quarter of ETA members, including some of its 'Special Forces' members and leaders. He destabilized the organization when it was a potential justification for conservatives to seize power and stop the democratisation process.

ETA sentenced him to death and posted his pictures throughout the Basque Country, in the hope of someone reporting his whereabouts. Mikel changed his name and face and has lived under an assumed identity ever since.

== Cast ==
- Eduardo Noriega as El Lobo
- José Coronado as Ricardo
- Mélanie Doutey as Amaia
- Silvia Abascal as Begoña
- Santiago Ramos as Pantxo
- Patrick Bruel as Nelson
- Jorge Sanz as Asier
- Manuel Zarzo as Matías

== Accolades ==
Year	Award	Category	Nominee(s)	Result	Ref.
2005	19th Goya Awards	Best Actor	Eduardo Noriega	Nominated	
2005	19th Goya Awards	Best Supporting Actress	Silvia Abascal	Nominated	
2005	19th Goya Awards	Best Production Supervision	Cristina Zumárraga, Miguel Torrente	Nominated	
2005	19th Goya Awards	Best Editing	Guillermo S. Maldonado	Won	
2005	19th Goya Awards	Best Special Effects	Jesús Pascual, Ramón Lorenzo, Reyes Abades	Won	
2005	14th Actors and Actresses Union Awards	Best Film Actress in a Secondary Role	Silvia Abascal	Nominated	
2005	14th Actors and Actresses Union Awards	Best Film Actor in a Minor Role	Santiago Ramos	Nominated	

== See also ==
- List of Spanish films of 2004
