= Jo Allen (make-up artist) =

American make-up artist

- Born: United Kingdom
- Occupation: Make-up artist

Jo Allen is an English make-up artist. She is best known for her make-up work in Gladiator, The Hours and The Sea Inside.

== Awards and nominations ==
Her work in The Sea Inside (2004) earned her a Goya Award for Best Make-Up and Hairstyles, as well as an Academy Award for Best Makeup.

She was also nominated for a BAFTA for her prosthetic work on Nicole Kidman and Julianne Moore on The Hours.

== Filmography ==
=== Makeup Department ===
Year	Film title	Designation	Notes
2014	Cesar Chavez	Hair designer / makeup designer	
2013	The Harvest	Personal makeup artist to Samantha Morton	
2011	Asmaa	Makeup & hair designer / special makeup designer	
2007	Mister Lonely	Hair designer / makeup designer	
2004	The Sea Inside	Special makeup designer	
2002	The Hours	Prosthetics makeup designer	
2002	The Four Feathers	Chief makeup artist: action unit	
2001	Captain Corelli's Mandolin	Prosthetic makeup artist	
2000	Quills	Prosthetic technician	
2000	Sorted	Makeup assistant	
2000	Gladiator	Makeup artist	
1999	Fanny and Elvis	Hair artist / make-up artist	
1999	A Midsummer Night's Dream	Additional makeup artist	
1998	Shot Through the Heart	Prosthetic makeup supervisor	TV movie
1998	Basil	Makeup artist	
1995	Operavox	Makeup artist	TV series (1 episode)
