= Crimen Ferpecto =

- Directed by: Álex de la Iglesia
- Screenplay by: Álex de la Iglesia; Jorge Guerricaechevarría
- Produced by: Roberto di Girolamo; Gustavo Ferrada; Álex de la Iglesia
- Starring: Guillermo Toledo; Mónica Cervera
- Cinematography: José L. Moreno
- Edited by: Alejandro Lázaro
- Music by: Roque Baños
- Production companies: Pánico Films; Sogecine; Planet Pictures
- Distributed by: Warner Sogefilms (Spain)
- Release date: 22 October 2004 (Spain)
- Running time: 106 minutes
- Countries: Spain; Italy
- Language: Spanish

Crimen Ferpecto, released as The Perfect Crime in the United States, and as The Ferpect Crime in the United Kingdom, is a 2004 Spanish-Italian black comedy film co-written, produced and directed by Álex de la Iglesia. It stars Guillermo Toledo and Mónica Cervera.

== Plot ==
Rafael is a women's clothing clerk at a large Madrid department store, Yeyo's. His department is filled with beautiful, comely young women whom Rafael routinely seduces. When Rafael vies for a management position with Don Antonio, a men's clothing clerk whom Rafael despises, a fluke causes Don Antonio to win the promotion. He fires Rafael and a fight ensues in which Rafael accidentally kills Don Antonio. Lourdes, an ugly and unassuming clerk at the store, witnesses the outcome of the fight, helps Rafael incinerate the body, and provides an alibi for the police. Rafael wins his coveted promotion, but at a terrible cost: Lourdes blackmails Rafael into an unwanted relationship. He is forced to fire his many former lovers, to marry Lourdes (she proposes on a live reality TV show) and to support clown-like women's clothing of her design. Rafael becomes so depressed he begins to hallucinate, seeing the ghost of Don Antonio who suggests Rafael should kill Lourdes. As the police are also pressing him again, he causes a fire in the department store and fakes his death, in front of his wife and a police officer. Five years later, he (with a false identity) has a small business selling ties and socks, but Lourdes' clown-like clothes are a success and she becomes a millionaire, the film ending with Rafael gobsmacked at a clown fashion parade and Lourdes catwalk, panning out to a huge digital billboard reading "Our Love Is Forever".

== Cast ==
- Guillermo Toledo as Rafael
- Mónica Cervera as Lourdes
- Luis Varela as Don Antonio
- Enrique Villén as Inspector Campoy
- Fernando Tejero as Alonso
- Javier Gutiérrez as Jaime
- Kira Miró as Roxanne

== Production ==
A Spain-Italy international co-production, the film was produced by Pánico Films and Sogecine alongside Planet Pictures, with the participation of TVE, Canal+ and EiTB.

== Release ==
Distributed by Warner Sogefilms, the film was theatrically released in Spain on 22 October 2004.

The film had a limited US release in theatres of New York and Los Angeles in August 2005.

== Reception ==
The film received very positive reviews from critics, 85% of critics gave the film a positive review based on 53 reviews and an average score of 7.1/10 according to Rotten Tomatoes.

== Accolades ==
Year	Award	Category	Nominee(s)	Result	Ref.
2005	19th Goya Awards	Best Actor	Guillermo Toledo	Nominated	
2005	19th Goya Awards	Best Supporting Actor	Luis Varela	Nominated	
2005	19th Goya Awards	Best New Actress	Mónica Cervera	Nominated	
2005	19th Goya Awards	Production Supervision	Juanma Pagazaurtundua	Nominated	
2005	19th Goya Awards	Best Sound	Charla Schmukler, Jaime Fernández, Sergio Burmann	Nominated	
2005	19th Goya Awards	Best Special Effects	Félix Bergés, Juan Ramón Molina	Nominated	

== See also ==
- List of Spanish films of 2004
- List of Italian films of 2004

== Bibliography ==
- Buse, Peter; Triana Toribio, Núria; Willis, Andy (2007). The cinema of Álex de la Iglesia. Manchester and New York: Manchester University Press.
