= Teresa Hurtado de Ory =

Spanish actress

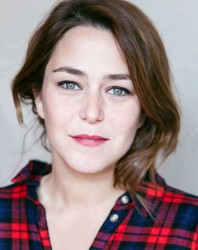
Teresa Hurtado de Ory

Teresa Hurtado de Ory (born 1983) is a Spanish actress.

Teresa Hurtado de Ory was born in Seville in 1983. She made her feature film debut in Astronauts (2003).

== Biography ==
Born in Seville in 1983, she studied art in high school. In 2003, she began her studies at the Higher School of Dramatic Arts in Seville. She later moved to Madrid to continue her acting studies at Juan Carlos Corazza school (2003-2007).

In 2003, she was selected in a casting call to star in Santiago Amodeo Astronauts (film), for which she was nominated for Best New Actress at the 2004 Goya Awards, which brought her to prominence and boosted her career in film and television.

She has appeared in several of the most popular Spanish television series in recent years, such as La Señora (TVE), La Moderna (TVE), and Bandolera (Antena 3). In 2014, her big break came when she was selected to star in the Cuatro series Ciega a citas. Hurtado played Lucía González during the two seasons that the series was on the air. After that leading role, she also participated in other productions such as La dama velada, El caso, El padre de Caín, and Presunto culpable. Since January 2019, she has been one of the stars of the Televisión Española medical drama Hospital Valle Norte, where she plays neurosurgeon Marta de la Hoz.

== Filmography ==
- Astronautas (2003) as Laura
- Ilusiones rotas-11 M (2005)
- Va ser que nadie es perfecto (2006) as Patricia
- Las 13 rosas (2007) as Victoria Muñoz García
- No me pidas que te bese, porque te besaré (2008) as Helena
- Voy a pasármelo bien (2022) as Almudena

Television

- Cuenta atrás (2007–2008) as Rocío
- El Caso. Crónica de sucesos (2016) as Paloma García
