= Manolo García (make-up artist) =

Spanish make-up artist

Manolo García (born in Xàtiva), a.k.a. Manuel García, is a Spanish make-up artist. He was nominated for the Goya Award for Best Make-Up and Hairstyles four times, and won the award for his work in The Sea Inside (2004). The latter film also earned him an Academy Award for Best Makeup nomination.
