= Bad Education (2004 film) =

2004 Spanish film directed by Pedro Almodóvar

- Theatrical release poster
- Spanish: La mala educación
- Directed by: Pedro Almodóvar
- Written by: Pedro Almodóvar
- Produced by: Agustín Almodóvar; Pedro Almodóvar
- Starring: Gael García Bernal; Fele Martínez; Daniel Giménez Cacho; Lluís Homar; Francisco Boira; Javier Cámara
- Cinematography: José Luis Alcaine
- Edited by: José Salcedo
- Music by: Alberto Iglesias
- Production company: El Deseo
- Distributed by: Warner Sogefilms
- Release date: 19 March 2004
- Running time: 105 minutes
- Country: Spain
- Languages: Spanish; Latin
- Budget: $5 million
- Box office: $40.4 million

Bad Education (Spanish: La mala educación, also meaning 'bad manners') is a 2004 Spanish neo-noir psychological melodrama film written and directed by Pedro Almodóvar. Starring Gael García Bernal, Fele Martínez, Daniel Giménez Cacho, Lluís Homar and Francisco Boira, the film focuses on two reunited childhood friends and lovers caught up in a stylized murder mystery. The metafictional film uses a deeply-nested narrative plot structure to explore themes of transsexuality, drug use, rape, and sexual abuse by Catholic priests.

The film was released on 19 March 2004 in Spain by Warner Sogefilms. Its subsequent festival run included screenings at Cannes, New York, Moscow, and Toronto. The film received critical acclaim, and was seen as a return to Almodovar's dark stage, placing it alongside films such as Matador (1986) and Law of Desire (1987).

== Plot ==
In 1980 Madrid, struggling film director Enrique Goded is looking for his next project when he receives an unexpected visit from an actor looking for work. The actor claims to be Enrique's boarding school friend and first love, Ignacio Rodriguez. Ignacio, who is now using the name Ángel Andrade, has brought along a short story titled "The Visit", hoping that Enrique would be interested in filming it—and giving him the starring role. Enrique is intrigued since "The Visit" describes their time together at the Catholic boarding school, while also including a fictional account of their reunion years later as adults.

"The Visit" is set in 1977. It tells the story of a transgender drag queen with the stage name Zahara, whose birth name is Ignacio. Zahara plans to rob a drunken admirer but discovers that the man is her boyhood lover Enrique Serrano, so she defiles him in his sleep instead. The encounter stirs angry memories, and Zahara visits her old school to confront Father Manolo, who abused her there when she was a boy. She demands one million pesetas from Manolo in exchange for halting publication of her manuscript, also called "The Visit".

That story is set in a Catholic boarding school for boys in 1964. At the school, Ignacio, a 10-year-old student with a beautiful boy soprano voice, is the object of lust of Father Manolo, the school principal and literature teacher. Ignacio falls in love with his classmate Enrique, and the two go to the local cinema and grope each other. Manolo discovers them together that night and becomes enraged. Ignacio offers to submit to the priest's molestation in exchange for having his friend not punished, but Manolo still expels Enrique anyway.

The director, Enrique Goded, wants to adapt the story but balks at Ángel's condition that he be cast as Zahara, feeling that the Ignacio he loved and the Ángel of today are totally different people. Suspicious, he drives to see Ignacio's mother in Ortigueira, Galicia and learns that in fact Ignacio has been dead for four years and that the man who came to his office is actually Ignacio's younger brother, Juan. Enrique's curiosity is piqued, so to "see how far [Juan] would go"—and without letting on what he knows—he casts Ángel/Juan in the role of Zahara. Ángel becomes Enrique's sexual partner, and Enrique revises the script so that it ends with Father Manolo, whom Zahara was trying to blackmail to get money for sex reassignment surgery, having Zahara murdered. After the scene is shot, Ángel breaks out in tears unexpectedly.

The film set is visited by Manuel Berenguer, formerly Father Manolo, who has resigned from the clergy. Berenguer confesses to Enrique that the new ending of the film is not far from the truth: Ignacio, a transsexual junkie, did blackmail him, but Berenguer managed to string her along—while mostly falling hard for Ignacio's younger brother, Juan. Juan and Berenguer, over twice as old, became sexual partners and after a while realized they both wanted Ignacio dead. Juan obtained some pure heroin which Berenguer gave to Ignacio, causing her to die from overdose after shooting up. After the crime, the relationship disintegrated, with Berenguer wanting to continue, but Juan breaking off all contact.

Now years later, meeting once again on the film set, Ángel/Juan threatens to kill Berenguer if he continues to pursue him, but Berenguer replies that he will never let him go. Now aware that his pretense is revealed, Juan visits Enrique to apologize, but Enrique is uninterested in Juan's weak excuses for murdering Ignacio. Before being turned away, Juan gives Enrique the letter addressed to him that Ignacio was in the middle of typing when he overdosed, reading "I think I have succeeded..."

An epilogue recounts that after the release of the film, Ángel and Enrique both achieved great success, although Ángel was relegated to television acting after "his career suffered ups and downs" in the 1990s. With Ángel now famous, Berenguer became the blackmailer, eventually leading Ángel to kill him in a hit-and-run.

== Cast ==
- Gael García Bernal as Juan / Ángel Andrade / Zahara
- Fele Martínez as Enrique Goded
  - Raúl García Forneiro as young Enrique
- Daniel Giménez Cacho as Father Manolo
- Javier Cámara as Paca/Paquito
- Petra Martínez as Mother
- Leonor Watling as Monica, wardrobe girl
- Lluís Homar as Sr. Manuel Berenguer
- Francisco Boira as Ignacio
  - Nacho Pérez as young Ignacio
- Juan Fernández as Martín
- Alberto Ferreiro as Enrique Serrano

== Production ==
García Bernal was required to display a convincing Castilian Spanish accent before being cast. Bernal stated that the performance he most sought to emulate was Alain Delon’s interpretation of Ripley in Purple Noon.

The New York Times reporter Lynn Hirschberg stated that Garcia Bernal had a falling out with Almodovar over the film's content, but Garcia Bernal denies this assertion. Garcia Bernal and Almodóvar had different ideas on the type of 'inner transvestite' in terms of Bernal's performance.

Almodóvar states that he worked on the screenplay for over 10 years.

== Release ==
The film was theatrically released in Spain on 19 March 2004. It opened in the 57th Cannes Film Festival on 12 May 2004, the first Spanish film to do so, debuting in French theatres on the same day. The film was released in Mexico on 10 September 2004. It opened theatrically in the United States on 19 November 2004. In the United States, the film was given an NC-17 for "A Scene Of Explicit Sexual Content" for a depiction of homosexual fellatio in the beginning of the film. An appeal was filed for a more marketable R, but the NC-17 rating was upheld and the film was released theatrically with the NC-17 rating. The scene was later blurred for the R-rated home media release.

== Reception ==
=== Box office ===
Bad Education grossed $7,356,224 at the Spanish domestic box office. At the North-American box office, it earned $147,370 in its opening weekend, ranking number 30. At the end of its North American theatrical run (its widest release being in 106 venues), the film had grossed $5,211,842. The film made $40,273,930 worldwide.

=== Critical response ===
The film received critical acclaim. Rotten Tomatoes reports that 88% of 148 reviews were positive, with an average rating of 7.6/10. The site's consensus states: "A layered, wonderfully-acted, and passionate drama." On Metacritic, the film has an 81 out of 100 rating, based on 34 critics, indicating "universal acclaim".

Ann Hornaday from The Washington Post wrote, "To watch Bad Education is to revel, along with Almodóvar, in the power of cinema to take us on journeys of breathtaking mystery and dimension and beauty." Marjorie Baumgarten from the Austin Chronicle wrote "With Bad Education, the great Almodóvar delivers the finest movie of his career." Peter Travers from Rolling Stone wrote "A rapturous masterwork." Roger Ebert gave the film three and a half stars out of four writing "Pedro Almodovar's new movie is like an ingenious toy that is a joy to behold, until you take it apart to see what makes it work, and then it never works again. While you're watching it, you don't realize how confused you are, because it either makes sense from moment to moment or, when it doesn't, you're distracted by the sex. Life is like that."

=== Accolades ===
Year	Award	Category	Nominee(s)	Result	Ref.
2005	19th Goya Awards	Best Film		Nominated	
2005	19th Goya Awards	Best Director	Pedro Almodóvar	Nominated	
2005	19th Goya Awards	Best Art Direction	Antxón Gómez	Nominated	
2005	19th Goya Awards	Best Production Supervision	Esther García	Nominated	
2005	30th César Awards	Best Film from the European Union		Nominated	
2005	14th Actors and Actresses Union Awards	Best Film Actor in a Leading Role	Gael García Bernal	Nominated	
2005	14th Actors and Actresses Union Awards	Best Film Actor in a Minor Role	Javier Cámara	Won	

== See also ==
- List of Spanish films of 2004
