= The 7th Day =

2004 Spanish film by Carlos Saura

- Spanish: El 7º día
- Directed by: Carlos Saura
- Screenplay by: Ray Loriga
- Produced by: Andrés Vicente Gómez
- Starring: Juan Diego; José Luis Gómez; José Garcia; Victoria Abril
- Cinematography: François Lartigue
- Edited by: Julia Juániz
- Music by: Roque Baños
- Production companies: Lolafilms; Artédis
- Distributed by: United International Pictures
- Release date: 23 April 2004 (Spain)
- Running time: 102 minutes
- Countries: Spain; France
- Language: Spanish

The 7th Day (Spanish: El 7º día) is a 2004 Spanish-French rural drama and tragedy film directed by Carlos Saura and written by Ray Loriga. Its cast features Juan Diego, José Luis Gómez, José García, and Victoria Abril, among others. Based on the Puerto Hurraco massacre, the plot follows a bitter rivalry between two families that started with an ill-fated love affair, and grows over three decades.

== Plot ==
In an isolated village in Extremadura, the Jiménez and Fuentes families have a violent history of land disputes, jealousy, envy, and violence. The hatred between the two families begins in the 1960s as a love story, between Amadeo Jiménez and Luciana Fuentes. Their romance ends when the fickle Amadeo drops Luciana, when she already has prepared for marriage. Feeling betrayed, Luciana expresses a vengeful wish on her seducer in the presence of her fragmented, devoted brother Jerónimo who, in turn, executes his sister's wish, resulting in the young man's cold and brutal murder in an open field.

Despite Jerónimo's capture and 30-year prison sentence, the shame on the Fuentes family still proves to be terrible burden as the townspeople continue to treat the siblings with open contempt and derision, culminating one day in a suspicious fire that engulfs the family home with their mother still inside. The Fuentes siblings move to a nearby village to avoid direct contact with the Jimenez family headed by Amadeo's brother, José, who feels the two families are now even.

Humiliated, forcibly driven out of town, and struggling with Luciana's delusional obsession over her broken engagement, the Fuentes's harbored animosity festers with each passing year, awaiting Jerónimo's release and pondering the inevitable day of reckoning against the community that had turned its back against them.

Two decades later when Jerónimo is released from jail, he rushes to look for José and stabs him. José survives. Carmen, José's wife, deeply affected by the attempt on her husband's life, pressures him to leave the village and move out to a big city, but Antonio is unable to sell his butcher shop for the money he is asking, and refuses to leave town out of fear.

The events are narrated by Isabel, the oldest of José's three young daughters. A summer romance develops between the teenager Isabel and Chino, a young rebel who goes around town riding his motorcycle. He is sincere in his affections and she falls for him. With his help, Isabel is determined to discover the seed of hatred that has tragically marked the story of the two families for more than thirty years. There is a village idiot ("El Tonto"), that watched José light the Fuentes house on fire. However, Isabel dismisses the testimony of the slow-witted, drug-addicted witness, the child of an incestuous relationship.

Isabel's love for Chino ends, before it has time to deepen, when Chino is forced to leave town abruptly fleeing the authorities that have discovered his illicit drug dealing. He gives her a gold chain as a farewell gift. Upset, she throws the chain into a swimming pool then dives in to retrieve it.

"On the seventh day of creating the world, God rested", Isabel notes, and that is why the most horrible things happen on Sunday. One Sunday the two aging brothers Antonio and Emilio Fuentes come to town with shotguns and ammunition. Their revenge engulfs the entire village and its inhabitants pay with their blood. Systematically and in cold blood, they gun down every person that cross their path beginning with the three young Jiménez sisters. Nine (9) are killed, 12 are injured. When the killing spree is over, Isabel is among the wounded survivors, but her two sisters Antonia and Encarna are, like many others, dead. When the police look for the two Fuentes brothers, they find them in a field and they do not struggle to be arrested. The two Fuentes sisters go to an asylum.

The next day, the Fuentes brothers are captured and sent to jail for life. Their two sisters, Luciana and Ángela, are also found guilty, but regarded as mentally unstable, they are locked away in a mental institution. Isabel Jiménez and her mother (Carmen) move to a city on the coast, leaving José behind. He has refused to leave the village. Isabel beholds a picture of happier times in which she is with her sisters.

== Cast ==
- Juan Diego as Antonio
- Victoria Abril as Luciana
- José Luis Gómez as Emilio
- José García as José
- Yohana Cobo as Isabel
- Oriol Vila as Chino
- Eulalia Ramón as Carmen
- Ramon Fontserè as Jerónimo
- Carlos Hipólito as El Tonto
- Ana Wagener as Ángela
- Juan Sanz as Amadeo
- Irene Escolar Antonia
- Alejandra Lozano as Encarnación

== Production ==
The film is a Spanish-French co-production by Andrés Vicente Gómez's Lola Films and Artedis. Shooting locations in the province of Segovia included Otero de Herreros, Zarzuela del Monte, Vegas de Matute and Segovia's old prison. The film was produced by Andrés Vicente Gómez, scored by Roque Baños, lensed by François Lartigue, and edited by Julia Juániz.

== Release ==
Distributed by Lolafilms Distribución, the film was theatrically released in Spain on 23 April 2004. It also screened at the 28th Montreal Film Festival on 1 September 2004.

== Accolades ==
| Year | Award | Category | Nominee(s) | Result | Ref. |
|---|---|---|---|---|---|
| 2004 | 28th Montreal Film Festival | Best Director | Carlos Saura | Won | |
| 2005 | 19th Goya Awards | Best Director | Carlos Saura | Nominated | |
| 2005 | 19th Goya Awards | Best Supporting Actor | Juan Diego | Nominated | |
| 2005 | 19th Goya Awards | Best Supporting Actress | Victoria Abril | Nominated | |
| 2005 | 19th Goya Awards | Best Art Direction | Rafael Palmero | Nominated | |
| 2005 | 14th Actors and Actresses Union Awards | Best Film Actor in a Secondary Role | Juan Diego | Nominated | |
| 2005 | 14th Actors and Actresses Union Awards | Best Film Actress in a Minor Role | Victoria Abril | Won | |

== See also ==
- List of Spanish films of 2004
