= Roma (2004 film) =

2004 film by Adolfo Aristarain

- DVD Cover
- Directed by: Adolfo Aristarain
- Screenplay by: Mario Camus; Kathy Saavedra
- Story by: Adolfo Aristarain
- Produced by: José Antonio Félez
- Starring: Juan Diego Botto; Susú Pecoraro; José Sacristán
- Cinematography: José Luis Alcaine
- Edited by: Fernando Pardo
- Release dates: 15 April 2004 (Argentina); 18 September 2004 (Spain)
- Running time: 155 minutes
- Countries: Spain; Argentina
- Language: Spanish

Roma is a 2004 Argentine-Spanish drama film directed by Adolfo Aristarain and starring Juan Diego Botto, Susú Pecoraro and José Sacristán.

== Synopsis ==
Young journalist Manuel Cueto (Juan Diego Botto) is sent by his publisher boss to help the solitary novelist Joaquín Góñez (José Sacristán) finish his long-overdue last book, which will be an autobiography. Brought out of his loneliness by the young man, Joaquín reminisces about his youth and experiences in Buenos Aires during the 1960s and 70s before reloctaing to Spain, as well as his intense relationship with his mother Roma, who was and still is the most important person in Joaquín's life.

== Cast ==
- Juan Diego Botto as Manuel Cueto/Joaco
- Susú Pecoraro as Roma Di Toro
- José Sacristán as Joaquín Góñez
- Agustín Garvíe as Joaco
- Vando Villamil as Áteo Di Toro
- Marcela Kloosterboer as Reneé
- Maximiliano Ghione as Guido
- Marina Glezer as Alicia
- Gustavo Garzón as Joaquín father
- Carla Crespo as Betty
- Marcos Mundstock as Gustavo Smirnoff
- Raúl Rizzo as Doctor Cassano
- Jean Pierre Noher as Pando
- Alberto Jiménez as Publisher (son)
- María Galiana as Portera
- Jane Darwell as Ma Joad (archive footage)
- Henry Fonda as Tom Joad (archive footage)

== Critical reception ==
Jonathan Holland, film critic for Variety magazine and reporting from the San Sebastián International Film Festival, liked the film and wrote, "Argentine helmer Adolfo Aristarain turns a compassionate eye toward his own spiritual and political education in the rangy, quietly affecting and rewardingly intense Roma, his most achieved work to date. Lengthy, but not over-long, rites-of-passage yarn takes one young man's life as the focal point for the struggles which tore Argentina apart in the late '60s and '70s, as well as being an homage to the dangerous pleasures of self-discovery. Film garnered positive reactions at home on its spring release and has the emotional coherence to strike universal chords offshore".

== See also ==
- List of Spanish films of 2004
- List of Argentine films of 2004
