= María Galiana =

Spanish actress

The Most Excellent María Galiana
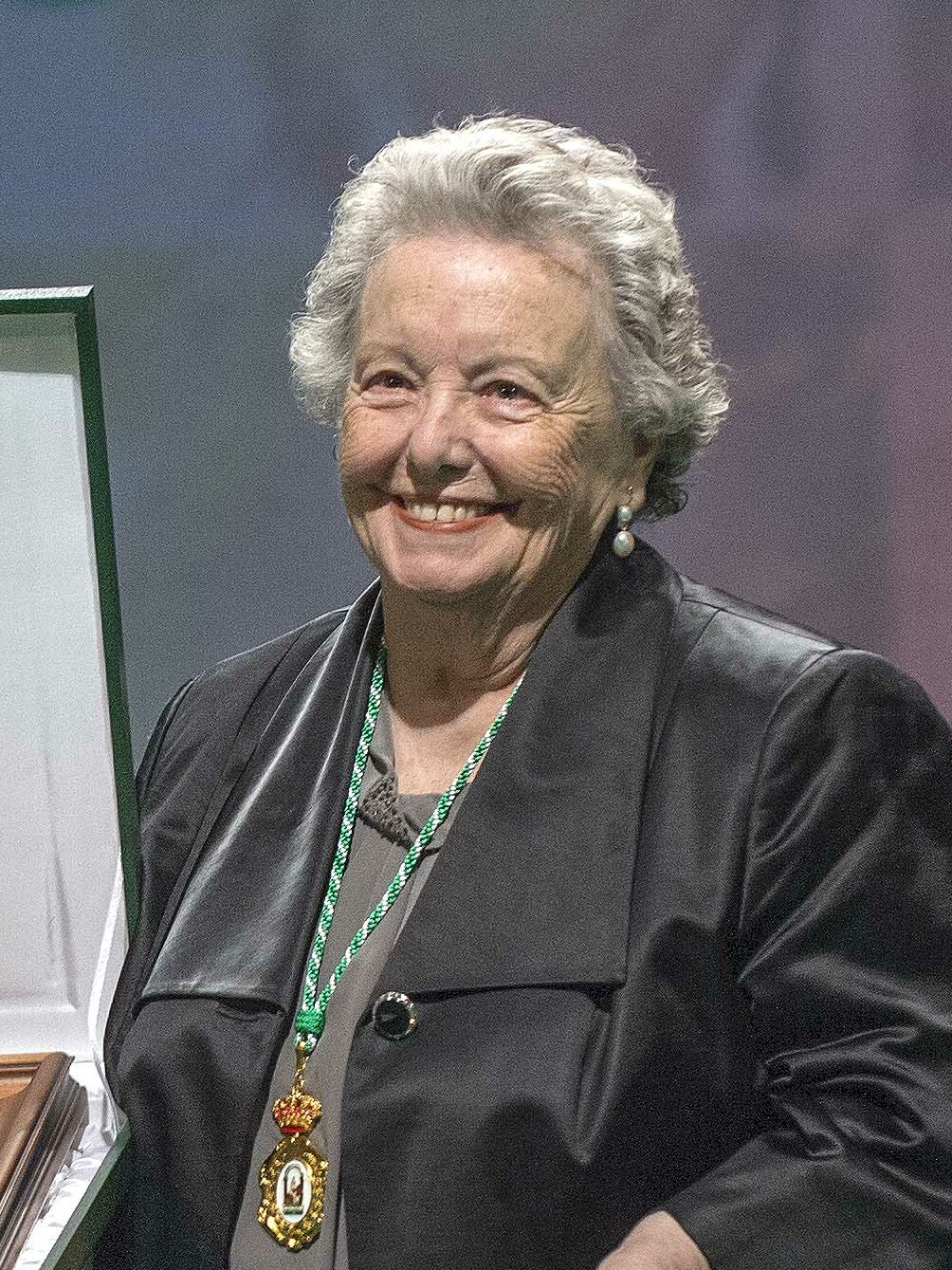
- Galiana in 2017
- Born: María Galiana Medina; 31 May 1935 (age 91); Seville, Spain
- Occupations: Actress; high school teacher
- Years active: 1985–present

María Galiana Medina (born 31 May 1935) is a Spanish actress. She won the Goya Award for Best Supporting Actress for her portrayal of the mother in Alone. She owes much of her popularity to her performance as Herminia in Cuéntame cómo pasó.

== Biography ==
Born in Seville on 31 May 1935, Galiana earned a licentiate degree in Philosophy and Letters and has worked as a high school teacher on history and art history in addition to her acting career. She made her film debut as an actress in Pasodoble (1988). Appearances in Malaventura, Belle Époque, Así en el cielo como en la tierra, Libertarias, and Yerma followed.

== Filmography ==
=== Film ===
Key
†	Denotes films that have not yet been released

Year	Title	Role	Notes	Ref.
2005	Tapas			
2004	Roma	Portera		
1999	Solas	Mother	Won - Goya Award for Best Supporting Actress	
1992	Belle Époque	La Polonia		
2026	Upiro			
TBA	Mi querida señorita †			

=== Television ===
Year	Title	Role	Notes
2001–2023	Cuéntame cómo pasó	Herminia López	

== Awards ==
Year	Award	Category	Work	Result
2000	Goya Award	Best Supporting Actress	Solas	Won

== Honors ==
- 2005 – Gold Medal of Merit in Labour (Kingdom of Spain, 18 November 2005).
