= Tiovivo c. 1950 =

- Theatrical release poster
- Directed by: José Luis Garci
- Written by: José Luis Garci; Horacio Valcárcel
- Produced by: Juan Carmona; Salvador Gómez Cuenca; José Luis Garci
- Starring: María Adánez; Francisco Algora; Manuel Andrés; Ángel de Andrés López
- Cinematography: Raúl Pérez Cubero
- Edited by: José Luis Garci
- Music by: Pablo Cervantes
- Production companies: Nickel Odeon Dos S.A. Enrique Cerezo P.C., S.A. PC29 S.A.
- Distributed by: Columbia Tri-Star Films
- Release date: 1 October 2004
- Running time: 150 minutes
- Country: Spain
- Language: Spanish

Tiovivo c. 1950 is a 2004 Spanish comedy-drama film directed by José Luis Garci and starring Elsa Pataky, María Adánez and Carlos Hipólito.

The film was nominated for six Goya Awards in 2005, and won the award for Best Production Design.

== Plot ==
Set in Madrid in the years after the Second World War, the film offers a nostalgic vision of a city managing to sustain entertainment, hope and love in the face of post-war hardship.

== Cast ==
- Elsa Pataky as Balbina
- María Adánez as Catalana
- Carlos Hipólito as Liebre
- Francisco Algora as Povedano
- Fernando Fernán Gómez as Tertuliano
- Agustín González as Ramón
- Ángel de Andrés López as Acisclo
- Aurora Bautista as Anunciada
- Fernando Guillén Cuervo as Higinio
- Alfredo Landa as Eusebio
- Carlos Larrañaga as Marcelino
- Francis Lorenzo as Paco
- Luisa Martín as Laurita
- Andrés Pajares as Romualdo
- Antonio Dechent as José Pedro Cervantes

== See also ==
- List of Spanish films of 2004
