= Mabel Rivera =

Spanish actress

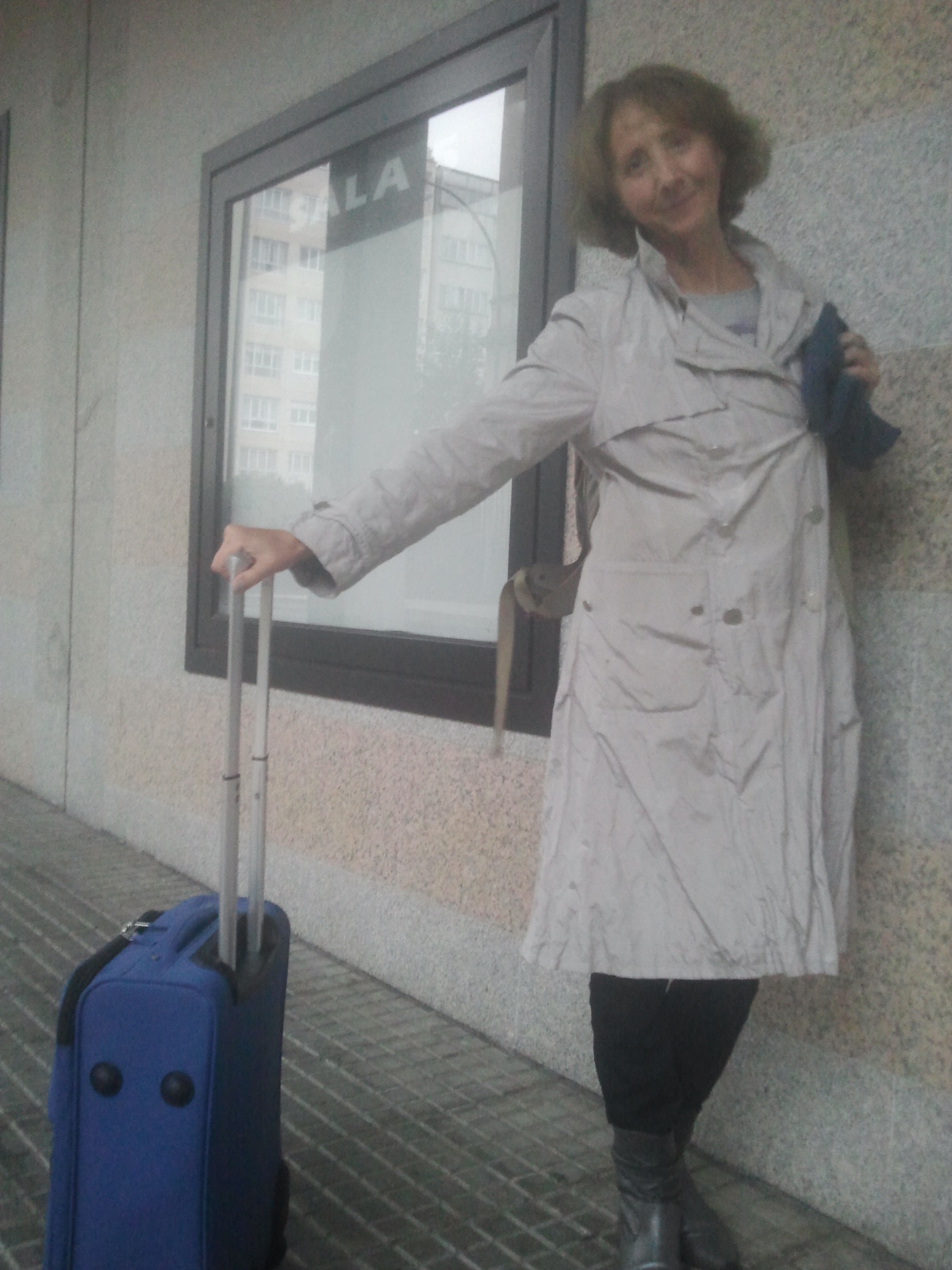
- Born: María Isabel Rivera Torres; 20 June 1952 (age 73); Ferrol (Corunna), Spain
- Occupation: actress
- Spouse: Enrique Banet
- Website: http://www.mabelrivera.es

María Isabel Rivera Torres (born 1952) better known as Mabel Rivera is a Spanish actress from Galicia.

She was born in the City and Naval Station of Ferrol (Corunna), North-western Spain. Though she started her career as an actress in the 1980s, it was not until her lead actress role in the Oscar-winning Best Foreign Language Film 2004 The Sea Inside that she received broad recognition.

She is fluent in Galician, Spanish, and Catalan, regional languages of Spain. She also speaks English and French with varying degrees of fluency.

== Filmography ==
| Year | Film | Role | Notes |
|---|---|---|---|
| 2025 | Sundays | | |
| 2011 | Game of Werewolves | Rose, abuela | |
| 2011 | Emilia Pardo Bazán, la condesa rebelde | | |
| 2011 | Wrinkles | Antonia (voice) | |
| 2010 | Libro de familia | | |
| 2009 | O Nordés | Amelia | |
| 2009 | 7.5. Steps | | |
| 2009 | Guts | Tia Elvira | |
| 2009 | Conexão | | |
| 2008 | Martes de carnaval | La Madre | |
| 2008 | Blackout | Claudia's Grandmother | |
| 2008 | Futuro: 48 Horas | Consuelo | |
| 2008 | Los Serrano | Sor Luz Divina | |
| 2008 | La bella Otero | Madrina Josefa | |
| 2007 | The Orphanage | Pilar | |
| 2007 | Mataharis | Mujer engañada | |
| 2007 | El estafador | Constanza | |
| 2007 | Hotel Tívoli | Josefa | |
| 2006 | Goya's Ghosts | María Isabel Bilbatúa | |
| 2006 | Faltas leves | Trini | |
| 2005 | Más que hermanos | Remedios | |
| 2004 | The Sea Inside | Manuela | Oscar-Winning 2004 |
| 1995–2004 | Pratos combinados | Balbina Santos | |
| 1989 | Os outros feirantes | | |
| 1987 | El bosque animado | Sra. Gundín | |
| 1986 | O enfermo imaxinario | Belisa | |
| 1982 | Ramón y Cajal | Mabel Isabel Rivera | |
