= Santiago Amodeo =

Spanish film director

- Born: Santiago José Amodeo Ojeda; 27 July 1969 (age 55); Seville, Spain
- Other names: Santi Amodeo
- Occupation(s): Film director, screenwriter, musician & composer
- Years active: 1998–present

Santiago José "Santi" Amodeo Ojeda (born 1969) is a Spanish film director, screenwriter, musician and composer.

== Biography ==
Santi was born in Seville and was lead guitar and composer of the bands Pestiños Revenios and Relicarios. He has worked with Alberto Rodriguez in many film projects. and his latest film is 'Yo, mi mujer y mi mujer muerta' released in 2019.

== Filmography ==
Filmography as film director:

- Prólogo a una historia de carreteras (1998). With Alberto Rodriguez.
- Bancos (1999). With Alberto Rodriguez.
- El Factor Pilgrim (2000). With Alberto Rodriguez.
- Astronautas (2003).
- Cabeza de perro (2005).
- ¿Quién mató a Bambi? (2013).
- Yo, mi mujer y mi mujer muerta (2019).
- Las gentiles (2021).

Filmography as screenwriter:

- El Factor Pilgrim (2000). by Santiago Amodeo and Alberto Rodriguez.
- El Traje (2002) by Alberto Rodriguez.
- Astronautas (2003) by Santiago Amodeo.
- Cabeza de Perro (2005) by Santiago Amodeo.
- Yo, mi mujer y mi mujer muerta (2019).

Filmography soundtracks as musician:

- El Factor Pilgrim (2000). by Santiago Amodeo and Alberto Rodriguez.
- 7 virgenes (2003) by Alberto Rodriguez.
- Cabeza de Perro (2005) by Santiago Amodeo.

Filmography soundtracks as composer:

- Astronautas (2003) by Santiago Amodeo.
- Cabeza de Perro (2005) by Santiago Amodeo.
