= Dafne Fernández =

Spanish actress and dancer

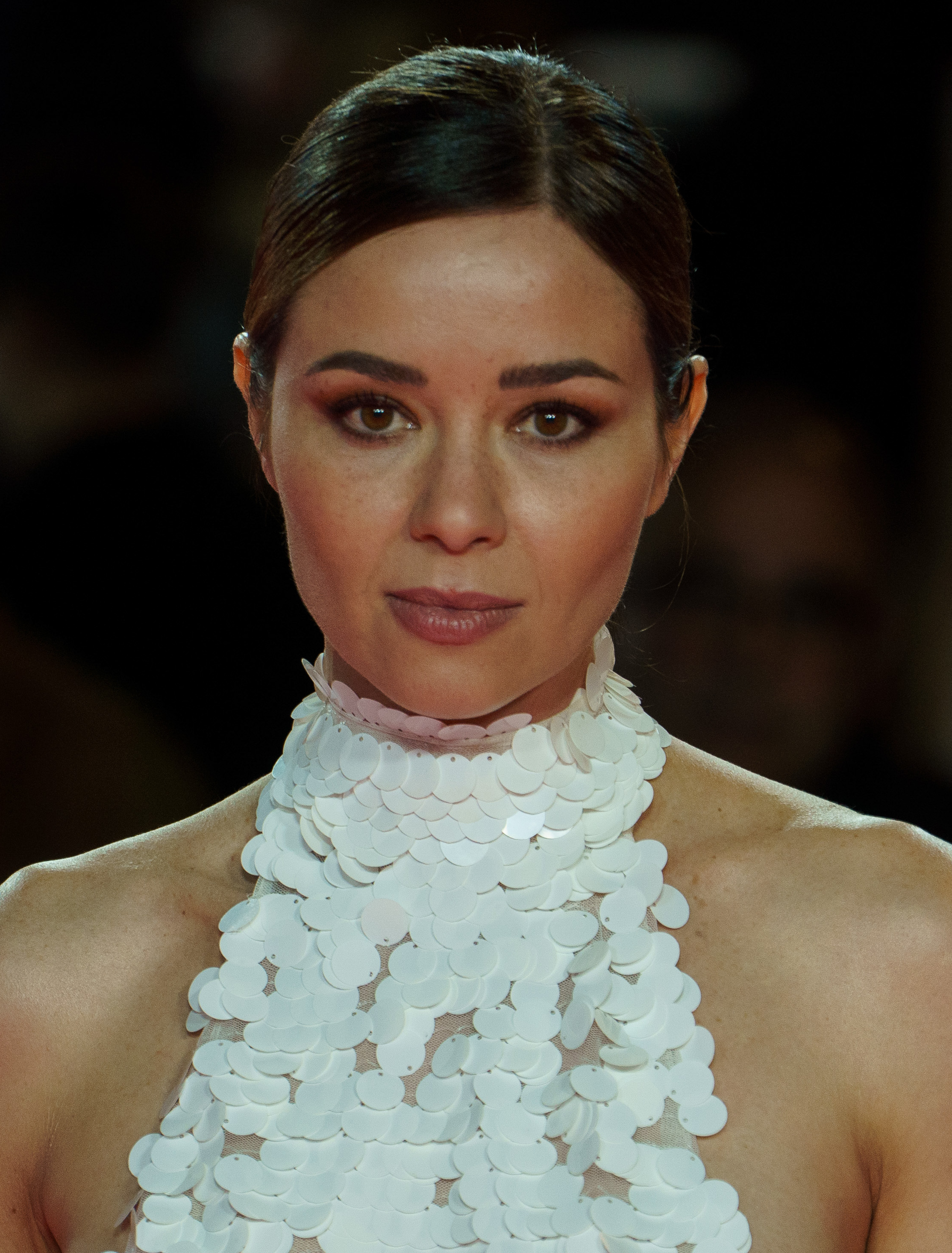
- Fernández in 2025
- Born: Dafne Fernández Fernández; 31 March 1985 (age 40); Madrid, Spain
- Occupations: Actress; Dancer
- Years active: 1996-present
- Known for: Marta Ramos in Un paso adelante
- Spouse: Mario Echevarría (m. 2017)
- Children: 2

Dafne Fernández Fernández (born 31 March 1985) is a Spanish actress and dancer.

== Career ==
Born in Madrid on 31 March 1985, Dafne Fernández made her feature film debut in Malena Is a Name from a Tango (1996). She became famous for playing Marta Ramos in the Spanish TV series Un paso adelante, along with actors like Mónica Cruz, Beatriz Luengo, Pablo Puyol, Silvia Marty and Lola Herrera. She studied dance and dramatic art, worked in the Fama musical, was the presenter of the XXI Goya Awards (2007) and also appeared in Naím Thomas's "Caliente" videoclip.

In 2017 she played Blanca in Perfect Strangers, directed by Álex de la Iglesia. In 2018 she appeared in the third season of MasterChef Celebrity. She was the third contestant to be eliminated.

She dubbed Beladga alongside Michelle Jenner, who dubbed Aloy, in the PS4 video game Horizon: Zero Dawn (2017).

== Personal life ==
On 2 September 2017 she married the photographer Mario Chavarría. They have one son, Jon, born on 30 August 2018, and one daughter, Alex, born on 9 December 2020.

== Filmography ==
| Year | Film | Role | Notes | Ref. |
|---|---|---|---|---|
| 1996 | Canguros | Niña | 1 episode | |
| 1996 | Malena es un nombre de tango | Malena niña | | |
| 1997 | Pajarico | Fuensanta | | |
| 1998 | Resultado final | María José niña | | |
| 1999 | Entre las piernas | Celia | | |
| 1999 | Goya en Burdeos | Rosario | | |
| 2000 | Paraíso | Irene | 1 episode | |
| 2000 | El otro barrio | | | |
| 2001 | Hombres felices | Hada | | |
| 2001 | Juego de Luna (Luna's Game) | Luna (age 14) | | |
| 2002 | La caja 507 | María Pardo Muñoz | | |
| 2002/2005 | Un Paso Adelante | Marta Ramos | 49 episodes | |
| 2002/2006 | Hospital Central | Rebeca | 2 episodes | |
| 2007 | Joint Security America | Captain Ines Diaz | pre-production | |
| 2008 | Los Serrano | Luna | | |
| 2009-12 | Tierra de Lobos | Nieves | | |
| 2010 | Entrelobos | Pizquilla | | |
| 2013 | Real Playing Game | Young Player #5 | | |
| 2017 | Perfect Strangers | Blanca | | |
