= The Holy Innocents =

The Holy Innocents may refer to:

- The victims of the Biblical Massacre of the Innocents, and any of several artistic depictions of this massacre (e.g. by Giotto di Bondone)
- The Holy Innocents (Adair novel), by Gilbert Adair
  - The Dreamers (2003 film), a film based, in part, on the Adair novel
- The Holy Innocents (Delibes novel), by Miguel Delibes
  - The Holy Innocents (film), film based on the Delibes novel
