= Mónica Cervera =

Spanish actress (born 1975)

- Born: Mónica Cervera Rodríguez; June 6, 1975 (age 50); Málaga, Andalusia, Spain
- Occupation: Actress
- Years active: 1999–2016

Mónica Cervera Rodríguez (born 6 June 1975) is a Spanish actress best known for her role as Lourdes in Álex de la Iglesia's black comedy film Crimen Ferpecto (2004), for which she received a Goya Award nomination for Best New Actress. She also appeared in films such as Piedras (2002) and 20 centímetros (2005), both directed by Ramón Salazar, and in the television series La que se avecina. In January 2024, it was widely reported that Cervera had been living homeless in Marbella, generating significant media attention in Spain.

== Early life ==
Cervera was born on 6 June 1975 in the province of Málaga, Andalusia. She grew up in Marbella, where her family settled. She studied dance in Madrid and dramatic arts at her native Málaga.

== Career ==
=== Film ===
Cervera made her screen debut in the short film Hongos (1999), directed by Ramón Salazar, which won numerous awards at international film festivals including the Audience Award for Best Short Film at the Málaga Film Festival. She went on to appear in the feature film Octavia (2002), directed by Basilio Martín Patino, and reunited with Salazar for Piedras (2002), which was selected for the Berlin International Film Festival. She also appeared in Entre vivir y soñar (2004), directed by Alfonso Albacete and David Menkes, alongside Carmen Maura.

Her breakthrough came with the role of Lourdes in Crimen Ferpecto (2004), a black comedy directed by Álex de la Iglesia and co-starring Guillermo Toledo. The role earned her a nomination for the Goya Award for Best New Actress at the XIX Goya Awards ceremony in January 2005; the award was won by Belén Rueda for Mar adentro.

In 2005, Cervera starred as Marieta in 20 centímetros, a musical comedy-drama directed by Ramón Salazar, in which she played a narcoleptic pre-operative transgender woman.

=== Television ===
Cervera's first television role was in the Antena 3 comedy series Manos a la obra (2001). She later appeared in Con dos tacones (2006) on TVE. Her last acting work was in the Telecinco comedy La que se avecina (2013–2016), where she played María Josefa Rivas, the sister of the character Amador Rivas, in three episodes. She has not participated in any acting project since 2016.

=== Theatre ===
Cervera also worked in theatre, particularly in Spain's microtheater format. In 2015, she starred in La mujer que llegaba a las seis, an adaptation of a short story by Gabriel García Márquez, directed by Joaquín Luna and co-starring José Prieto.

== Personal life ==
In January 2024, the Spanish magazine Semana reported that Cervera had been living homeless on a park bench in Marbella. The revelation generated widespread media coverage in Spain and prompted reactions from several fellow actresses, including Marisa Paredes and Lola Dueñas.

In February 2025, Cervera was arrested in Marbella by the Policía Nacional on an outstanding judicial warrant and was placed in provisional detention. It was subsequently reported that she had been sentenced in 2023 to eleven months in prison for attempted robbery with violence stemming from an incident in 2021 in Marbella. As of June 2025, Cervera was reported to be incarcerated at the Algeciras prison in Cádiz province.

== Filmography ==
=== Film ===
Year	Title	Role	Director
1999	Hongos (short)	Marisa	Ramón Salazar
2002	Piedras	Anita	Ramón Salazar
2002	Octavia	Toñi	Basilio Martín Patino
2004	Entre vivir y soñar	Rocío	Alfonso Albacete, David Menkes
2004	Crimen Ferpecto	Lourdes	Álex de la Iglesia
2005	20 centímetros	Marieta	Ramón Salazar

=== Television ===
Year	Title	Role	Notes
2001	Manos a la obra	Nico	Antena 3
2006	Con dos tacones	Malena	TVE
2013–2016	La que se avecina	María Josefa Rivas	Telecinco; 3 episodes

== Awards and nominations ==
Year	Award	Category	Work	Result
2000	Málaga Film Festival	Audience Award for Best Short Film	Hongos	Won
2005	Goya Awards	Best New Actress	Crimen Ferpecto	Nominated
