= Silvia Marty =

Spanish actress, dancer, and singer (born 1980)

- Born: Silvia Marty; 10 July 1980 (age 45); Barcelona, Spain

Silvia Marty (born 10 July 1980 in Barcelona, Catalonia, Spain) is a Spanish actress, dancer and singer.

Silvia became famous for playing Ingrid Muñoz in the Spanish TV series Un paso adelante, along with actors like Mónica Cruz, Beatriz Luengo, Pablo Puyol, Dafne Fernández, and Lola Herrera.

She is a member of the Upa dance musical group, which consist of young actors from the Spanish series Un paso adelante and also presented the "XIII premios unión de actores".

== Filmography ==
Year	Work	Role	Notes
2002/2005	Un paso adelante	Ingrid Muñoz	TV series 84 episodes
2006	La Mandrágora	Yolanda	TV series 1 episode
2006	Pocas nueces	Film Lucia	
2007	Cuenta atrás	Pepa	TV series 1 episode
2007	Hospital Central	Carmen	TV series 3 episodes
2007	El Hombre de arena	Emilia	Film
2007	Oviedo Express	Petra	Film
2008	Los Serrano	María	TV series 1 episode
2008	Lex	Silvia	TV series 16 episodes
2009	Amar en tiempos revueltos	Luisa	TV series
2017	Perdóname, señor	Irene Oliver	TV series
