= Ramon Salazar =

Ramon Salazar is the name of:

- Ramón Salazar (director) (born 1973), Spanish film director and screenwriter
- Ramon Salazar (Resident Evil), character from the video game Resident Evil 4
- Ramon Salazar (24 character), character from the television series 24
