= Elisabeth Jordán =

Spanish singer

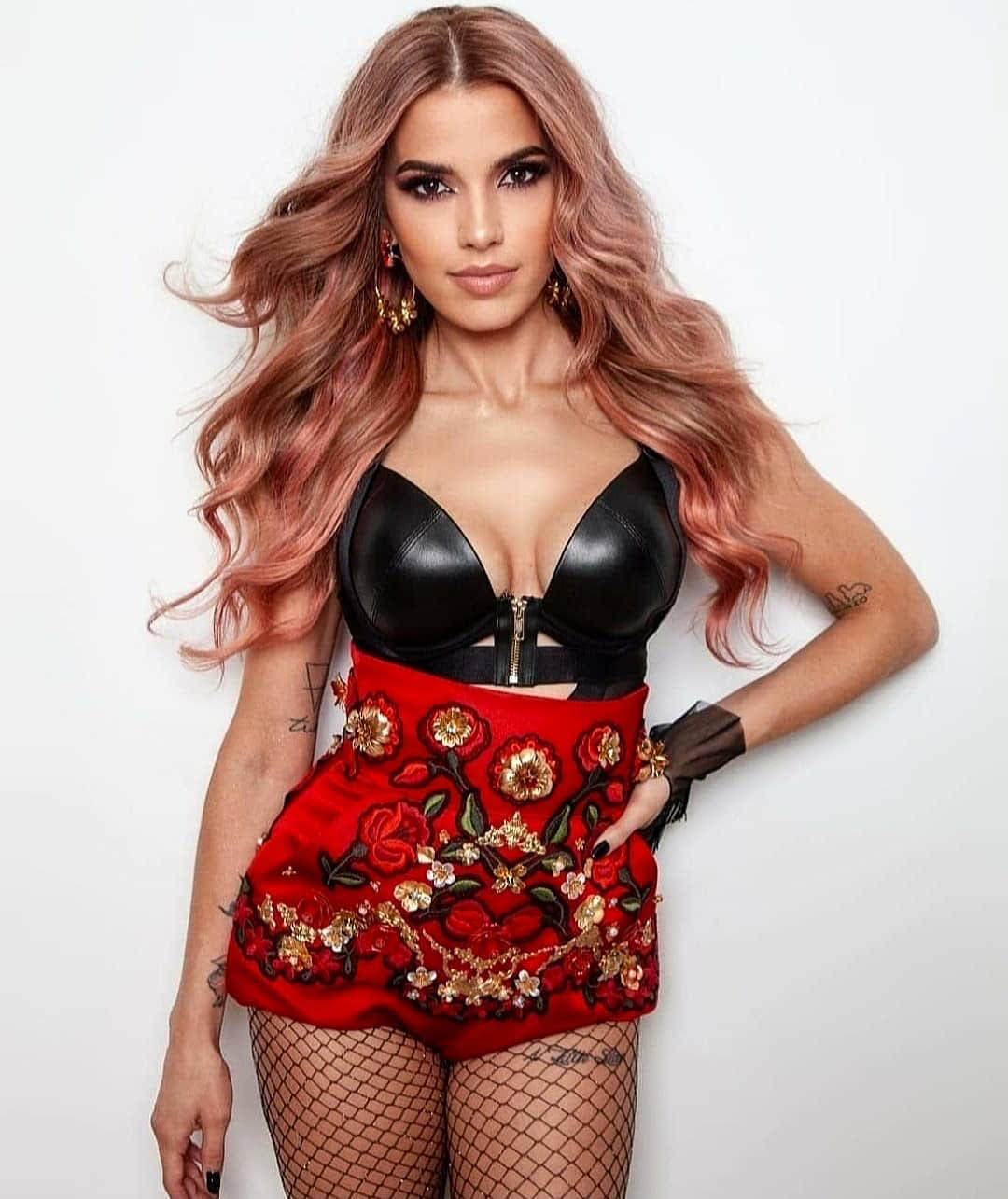
Elisabeth Jordán

Elisabeth Jordán (born 26 August 1983 in Cartagena, Spain) started her professional career on the television program Popstars: Todo por un sueño, the Spanish version of Popstars. She won, after never having been nominated for exclusion, and joined the band Bellepop.

After recording an album with Bellepop and touring, she joined the television series Un paso adelante and the band UPA Dance.
