= Clandestinos (2007 film) =

- Directed by: Antonio Hens
- Written by: Antonio Hens and Gabriel Olivares
- Produced by: Marco Antonio Berrocal; Sergio de la Puente; Julio Gutiérrez; David Machado
- Starring: Israel Rodríguez; Mehroz Arif; Hugo Catalán; Juanma Lara; Elena Martínez; Inma Cuevas; Pepa Aniorte; Fanny de Castro; Luis Hostalot
- Cinematography: César Hernando
- Edited by: Julio Gutiérrez
- Music by: Sergio de la Puente
- Distributed by: Darkwind Seven (Sp)
- Release dates: November 3, 2007 (LesGaiCineMad); February 15, 2008 (Spain)
- Running time: 81 minutes
- Country: Spain
- Language: Spanish

Clandestinos is a 2007 Spanish film directed by Antonio Hens about a young gay man who breaks out of jail with two companions, and the search for his boyfriend and later involvement in ETA.

== Plot ==
Xabi was abandoned as a child and his feral life led to many spells in reform schools. After being released this time, he meets Inaki, an older man who is involved in ETA terrorism and who becomes a true friend, teacher and lover to the youth. Unfortunately, Xabi is sent to a high security correctional facility after throwing a gasoline bottle at a policeman during a robbery, injuring him severely. Xabi, along with a young Mexican and a Moroccan named Driss, both of whom are to be deported, manage to escape and get to Madrid. Xabi looks for Inaki as he wants to join ETA, but cannot find him.

== Cast ==
- Israel Rodríguez as Xabi
- Mehroz Arif as Driss
- Hugo Catalán as Joel
- Juanma Lara as Manuel
- Elena Martínez as Elena
- Inma Cuevas as Rebeca
- Pepa Aniorte as Marta
- Fanny de Castro as Vecina
- Luis Hostalot as Iñaki
- Ana Rayo as Edurne
- Juan Luis Galiardo as Germán
- Pablo Puyol as Lucas
- Antonio Dechent as Fermín
- Manuel Salas as Droguero
- Asun Ayllón as Ferretera
- Raúl Zajdner as Camionero
- Antonio Salazar as Guardia civil
- Aquilino Gamazo as Guardia de seguridad
- Ángeles Maeso as Repartidora de pizzas
- Juan Gea as Voz (voice)
- Maite Sandoval as (voice)
- Pablo Vega as (voice)
- Estrella Zapatero as Voz (voice)

== Release ==
The film premiered at the 2007 LesGaiCineMad Film Festival. It was featured in the 2008 New York LGBT Film Festival.
