= Marta Ribera =

Spanish theatrical actress star (born 1971)

Marta Ribera is a Spanish theatrical actress star born on 27 july 1971. She is perhaps best known for her roles in the Frank Wildhorn musical Jekyll & Hyde in the starring role of Lucy Harris and her most recent role as The Lady of the Lake in Monty Python's Spamalot. She has also appeared as Sally Bowles in Cabaret, amongst other roles.

She starred opposite singing star Raphael who played the title roles in Jekyll & Hyde. She originated the role in Madrid, and went on the play the role in the national tour on and off for the next two years. She can be heard on the cast recording made for the Spanish production.

Spamalot in Spain began its run in September 2008, in Barcelona. She originated the starring role of Lady of the Lake, and can be heard on the cast album, which was released in December 2008.

In 2010 she starred as Velma Kelly in the Spanish production of Chicago.

From 2004 to 2005, she played the role of "Eva Ruiz" in the Spanish television series Un paso adelante (One Step Forward), Seasons 5 and 6.

== Theatre ==
Gypsy (2024), Soho Theatre Malaga, Rose

- Chicago (2010, National Tour, Barcelona, Madrid): Velma Kelly
- Spamalot (2008, Barcelona): Lady of the Lake
- Cabaret (2006, National Tour, Barcelona): Sally Bowles
- Peter Pan (2002, Madrid, Barcelona): Narrator / Mrs. Darling
- Blood Brothers (2001, Madrid): Mrs. Johnstone
- Falsettos (2001, Madrid): Trina
- Annie (2000, Madrid, National Tour, Barcelona): Grace Farrell
- Jekyll & Hyde (2000, Madrid, National Tour, Barcelona): Lucy Harris
- Grease (1999, Madrid): Betty Rizzo
- Peter Pan (1998, Madrid, National Tour): Mrs. Darling
- West Side Story (1996, Barcelona, National Tour, Madrid): Anita
- The Rocky Horror Show (1996, Barcelona): Magenta

== Discography ==
- Chicago – National Tour Cast (2010)
- Spamalot – Original Barcelona Cast (2008)
- Cabaret – National Tour Cast (2006)
- Falsettos – Original Madrid Cast (2001)
- Annie – Madrid Cast (2000)
- Jekyll & Hyde – Original Madrid Cast (2000)
- Peter Pan – Original Madrid Cast (1998)
