= Chicas Al Poder =

Studio album by Bellepop
- Released: November 25, 2002 (Only in Spain)
- Studio: Estudios 54, Torrelodones
- Genre: Pop/Dance
- Length: 40:00
- Label: Warner Music Spain
- Producers: Juan Sueiro, Francesc Pellicer

Chicas Al Poder is an album by Bellepop, released in 2002.

== Track listing ==
No.	Title	Writer(s)	Length
1.	"Esta Noche Mando Yo" (Party 2night)	Tonino Speciale, Ana Esther Alborg (adaptation)
2.	"La Vida Que Va" (Heart In Distress)	Thomas Gustafson, Hugo Lira, Kabah
3.	"Paraíso" (Paradise)	L. Russell Brown, Joel Diamond, Julio Guiu (adaptation)
4.	"Mi Amor Será Para Siempre" (Nothing's Gonna Last Forever)	Fredrik Kempe, Carlos Izaga (adaptation)
5.	"La Fuerza De Tu Amor"	Raul Nacher
6.	"Si Pides Más"	M. Mar G. Arada, Bruno Nicolas, Kiko Velazquez
7.	"Sólo Es Amor" (It's Only Love)	Craig Hardy, Gary Miller, Dave James, Fernando Montesinos (adaptation)
8.	"Mi Corazón" (All Through The Night)	Bea Eden, Simon Stirling, Katie Bickell, Hayley Birkbeck, Alex Head, Mavi Díaz (adaptation)
9.	"No Me Pidas Amor"	Juan Sueiro, Azucena Recoveni, Jarka Miller
10.	"Si Tu Me Llamas"	Marc Martín, Ignacio Ballesteros, Jorge Flores Doctor Flo

== Special Edition ==
On May 13, 2003 a Special Edition of Chicas Al Poder was released in Spain.

=== Track listing ===
1. "Chicas al poder" (Spanish version of "I've Got My Eyes On You" by Jessica Simpson)
2. "Esta noche mando yo (New Mix)"
3. "La vida que va"
4. "Paraíso"
5. "Mi amor será para siempre"
6. "La fuerza de tu amor"
7. "Si pides más (Radio Edit)"
8. "Sólo es amor"
9. "Mi corazón"
10. "No me pidas amor"
11. "Si tú me llamas"
12. "Si pides más (Latin House Extended)"
13. "Chicas al poder (Versión Acústica)"
14. "Si pides más (Dub Remix)"
15. "Si pides más (Latin House Single)"

=== DVD ===
1. "Videoclip Chicas al poder"
2. "Videoclip La vida que va"
3. "Videoclip Si pides más"
4. "Making of Chicas al poder"
5. "Diario secreto de Bellepop"
