= Bellepop =

Spanish pop music girl group

Bellepop were a Spanish pop music girl group formed from five contestants from the 2002 Spanish TV show, Popstars. The group consisted of Elisabeth Jordán, Norma Álvarez, Davinia Arquero, Marta Mansilla and Carmen Miriam Jiménez.

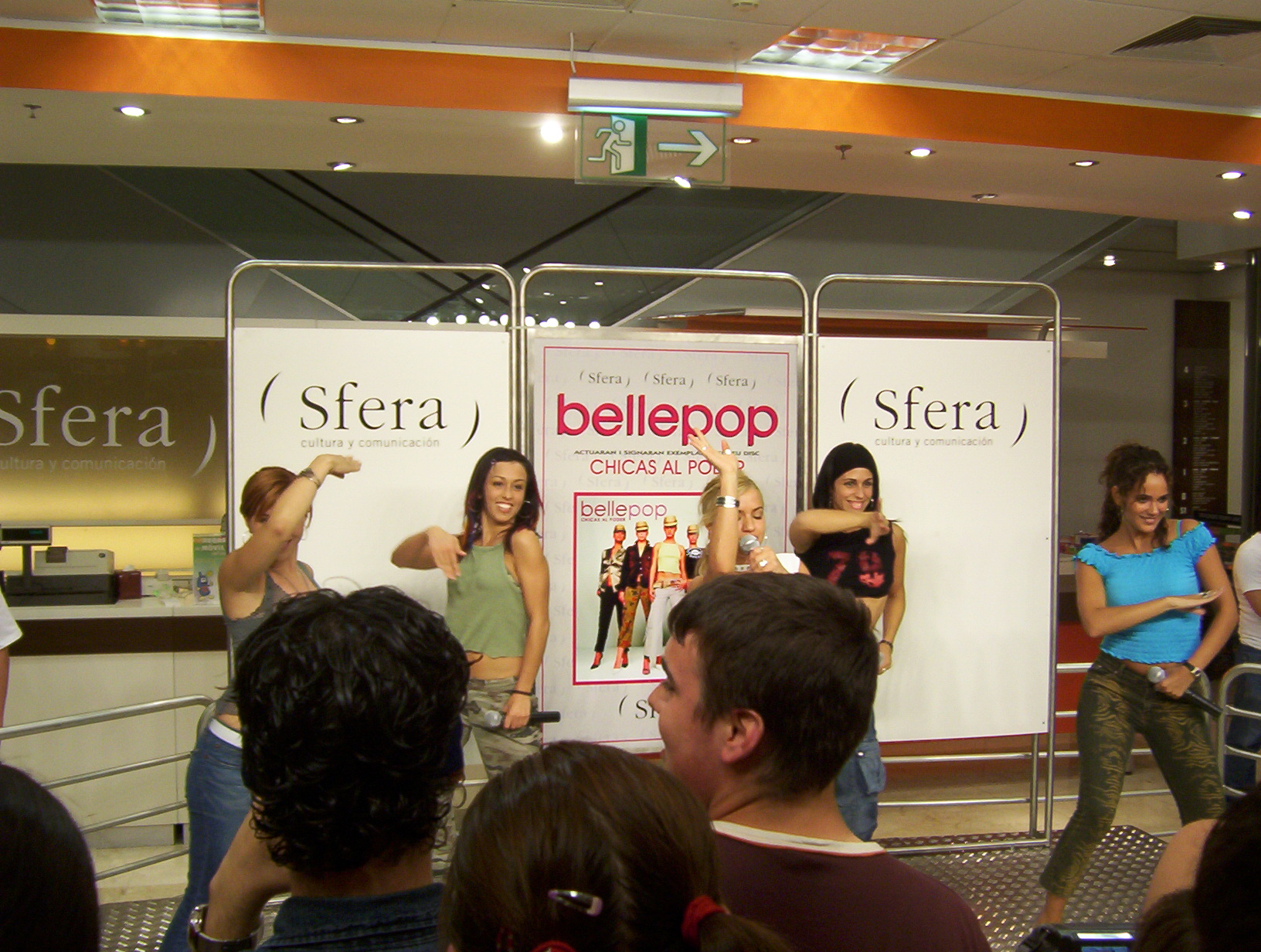
Bellepop promoting their first album "Chicas al poder"

== Discography ==
=== Albums ===
- Chicas Al Poder (Spain #16, November 25, 2002) Gold (more than 70,000 copies sold)
- Chicas Al Poder. Special Edition (Spain N/C, May 13, 2003) (more than 25,000 copies sold)

=== Singles ===
From Chicas Al Poder

- "La Vida Que Va" - #4
- "Si Pides Más" - #7

From Chicas Al Poder. Special Edition

- "Chicas Al Poder" - #3
- "Esta Noche Mando Yo" - #16

In a 2020 reunion, the group released the single We Represent.
