= Five Hours with Mario =

Five Hours with Mario (Spanish: Cinco horas con Mario) is a novel by Spanish writer Miguel Delibes, published in 1966. It is included in the List of the 20th century's 100 best novels in Spanish compiled by the Spanish newspaper El Mundo.

The plot centers on the life of Carmen "Menchu" Sotillo and her recently deceased husband, Mario Díez. Through the novel, Delibes recreates Spanish society of the 1950s.

== Plot ==
Carmen Sotillo has just become a widow after Mario's death. She is alone by his body during the wake after family members and acquaintances have left; and for the next five hours, she monologues to Mario as if he were still alive. Mario enjoyed reading the Bible and underlining phrases. Therefore, Carmen structures her speech around the quotes underlined by her husband. Menchu reproaches Mario's behavior, criticizes his political and religious ideas, and blames him for her unhappiness. For example, one of Carmen Sotillo's criticisms of her husband is that he never bought a car — specifically a SEAT 600, which was once a symbol of social prestige in Spain. Instead, Mario preferred to ride a bicycle; this shows the contrast between Carmen's pretentious attitudes and Mario's healthy habits, as her constant criticism of Mario actually turn into boomerang-like self-criticism. Throughout the night, Menchu also expresses more intimate feelings such as jealousy, possible betrayal, and more.

== Features and structure ==
The core of this story is the monologue of Carmen (which sometimes becomes a false dialogue, as she imagines the reactions of her deceased husband) — a conservative middle-class woman by the body of her husband Mario, a high school teacher and committed journalist and intellectual. Through her memory of their unsatisfactory life together, Delibes recreates provincial Spain of the time, highlighting problems like the lack of communication between the couple and even the conflict between the "two Spains." The novel consists of a prologue, a main body of 27 chapters (Carmen's monologue), and an epilogue. Each chapter begins with a biblical quote that Mario had underlined. From these quotes, Carmen develops her thoughts, primarily continuous reproaches regarding his moral integrity and lack of ambition, which she believes hindered the achievement of the recognition and social status she desired. She also criticizes his sense of superiority and coldness towards her. The informal style and temporal disorder are traits of the novel's use of "stream of consciousness", contributing to its realism.

== Theater ==
On November 26, 1979, a theatrical adaptation premiered at the Teatro Marquina in Madrid, directed by Josefina Molina, with Lola Herrera in the role of Carmen Sotillo. In 1980, the play moved to Teatro Lara in Madrid. It then toured throughout Spain and returned to Madrid. Josefina Molina made the film Función de noche (Night Performance) in 1981, a semi-documentary about the marital conflicts of Lola Herrera and her husband during the time she was touring with the play. The lack of communication between the real couple parallels the lack of communication between the fictional couple in the play that Lola portrays; the action of the film takes place in the intermission between one performance (evening) and the next (night).

In December 1988, the play premiered in Paris, produced by José Agost and directed by Jorge Luis Rodríguez, with Pilar Pérez as Carmen Sotillo. In September 2010, actress Natalia Millán starred in a revival with Víctor Elías.

In 2018, Lola Herrera reprised the role of Carmen Sotillo for a tour across Spain. In mid-2019, the play returned to the Teatro Bellas Artes in Madrid. At the start of the 2020 season, the COVID-19 pandemic suspended the performances. In 2021, the play returned to the Teatro Bellas Artes from January 12 to March 7.
