= Un paso adelante =

- Created by: Daniel Écija; Ernesto Pozuelo; Jesús del Cerro
- Creative directors: (Choreographers); Luka Yexi (seasons 1+2); Anna & Carlos Infante (seasons 3+4); Myriam Benedited (seasons 5+6)
- Starring: Beatriz Luengo; Mónica Cruz; Raúl Peña; Pablo Puyol; Miguel Ángel Muñoz; Silvia Marty; Dafne Fernández; Lola Herrera
- Country of origin: Spain
- No. of seasons: 6
- No. of episodes: 84

Production
- Running time: 80 minutes

Original release
- Network: Antena 3
- Release: 8 January 2002 – 24 April 2005

Un paso adelante (One Step Forward) is a Spanish TV drama similar to the American 1980s TV series Fame. It was originally broadcast on Spanish channel Antena 3 from 2002 to 2005. It has also been a huge success in Spanish-speaking countries (including Latin America), in Germany (where it was retitled Dance – Der Traum vom Ruhm), Italy (where it was retitled Paso Adelante), Serbia and Montenegro (where it was retitled Korak napred) and in France (where it was retitled Un, Dos, Tres). It began airing on Séries+ in Canada in 2011.

A sequel series titled UPA Next premiered on 25 December 2022 on Atresplayer Premium.

== Plot ==
The show focuses on the professors and the students of Carmen Arranz, one of the most prestigious art schools in Spain. The school is located in Madrid. The story follows Lola, Pedro, Rober, Jero, Ingrid, Silvia and Marta. They want to be successful singers, dancers and actors but they learn as they go along that the path to fame is not an easy one.

== Cast list ==
=== Professors ===
- Lola Herrera as Carmen Arranz
- Beatriz Rico as Diana de Miguel
- Natalia Millán as Adela Ramos
- Alfonso Lara as Juan Taberner
- Víctor Mosqueira as Cristóbal Soto
- Toni Acosta as Jacinta "J.J." Jimenez
- Jaime Blanch as Gaspar Ruiz
- Pedro Peña as Antonio Milá
- Fabián Mazzei as Horacio Alonso
- Fanny Gautier as Alicia Jauregi
- Esther Arroyo as Irene Miró
- Juan Echanove as Mariano Cuéllar
- Marta Ribera as Eva Ruiz
- Satur Barrios as Cristina
- Rocío Calvo as Claudia Romero
- Chiqui Fernández as Purificación "Puri" Lacarino

=== Students ===
- Beatriz Luengo as Dolores "Lola" Fernández
- Miguel Ángel Muñoz as Roberto "Rober" Arenales
- Pablo Puyol as Pedro Salvador
- Mónica Cruz as Silvia Jauregui
- Silvia Marty as Ingrid Munoz
- Dafne Fernández as Marta Ramos
- Raúl Peña as Jeronimo "Jero" Juiz
- Yotuel Romero as Pavel Rodriguez
- Erika Sanz as Erika Sanz
- Arantxa Valdivia as Luisa Ruiz
- Patricia Arizmendi as Sonia
- Junior Miguez as Junior Miguez
- Asier Etxeandia as Benito "Beni" Lopez
- Alfonso Bassave as Josè
- Ricardo Amador as Rafael "Rafa" Torres
- Edu del Prado as Cesar Martín

=== Others ===
- Agustín Galiana as Sebastián
- Elisabeth Jordán as Tania
- José Ángel Egido as Víctor Arenales
- Mario Martín as Román Fernández
- William Miller as Nacho Salinas

== Main characters ==
Silvia Jáuregui (Mónica Cruz) is the best female dancer at the school, besides being the director's niece. Her mother was a professional dancer and her father was a conductor. Therefore, she had the opportunity to tour the world with them when they were performing abroad. In the first episodes, she was quite snobbish and reserved. So she had difficulty in making friends. But, throughout the episodes, she became a close friend of Ingrid and Lola. She has had many lovers: Pedro, Rober (who eventually got her pregnant), Pavel, cocaine addict Alvaro, and Horacio (an ex-boyfriend of her aunt's).

Dolores "Lola" Fernández (Beatriz Luengo) is a young woman who has devoted her entire life to dance and her family (her father and younger brother). She has a talent for singing but her real passion is dancing. Throughout the episodes, she has had many lovers: Jerónimo, Pavel (played by Orishas’ frontman Yotuel who is also Beatriz Luengo's partner in real life), and Pedro.

Ingrid Muñoz (Silvia Marty) is an extroverted and optimistic young woman who idolises Aretha Franklin. She had a romance with Juan, one of her teachers. She broke up with him, however, after he got his colleague Diana pregnant.

Pedro Salvador (Pablo Puyol) is the son of an Asturian fisherman and he moved to Madrid to learn how to dance. Actually, he considers dance as a way to overcome his shyness towards girls. Besides, he has to work part-time jobs in order to pay for his scholarship.

Roberto “Rober” Arenales (Miguel Ángel Muñoz) is the seventh son of a wealthy family from San Sebastián. He likes behaving as a tough guy to hide his insecurities and he's a ladies' man. He has a son, Sergio with an ex-girlfriend from when he was 16.

Jeronimo “Jero” Juiz (Raul Peña), is a songwriter ready to do anything to gain fame. He had a romance with Lola but she ended up cheating on him with another student, Pavel.

Marta Ramos (Dafne Fernández) is a classical dancer. She is the dance teacher Adela's sister. She had an affair with Pedro, and afterwards, with Rober. In the final season, she was diagnosed with a heart disease. But, eventually, she overcame it and returned to dance.

== Adaptations ==
It was adapted in 2007 to Romania by Media Pro Pictures as Cu un pas înainte.

== Sequel ==
A sequel series titled UPA Next with Miguel Ángel Muñoz, Beatriz Luengo and Mónica Cruz reprising their roles premiered on 25 December 2022.
