= Pasaje al amanecer =

- Film poster
- Directed by: Andreu Castro
- Screenplay by: Andreu Castro
- Produced by: Albert Bori; Óscar Cornejo; Adrián Madrid
- Starring: Elvira Mínguez; Nicolás Coronado; Ruth Díaz; Carles Francino; Andrea Duro; Lola Herrera; Antonio Valero
- Cinematography: Jordi Luengo; Bernardo Rossetti
- Edited by: Julia Juaniz
- Music by: Diego Navarro
- Production companies: Art Media Producciones; La Fabrica de la tele
- Distributed by: VerCine
- Release dates: 24 October 2016 (Seminci); 5 May 2017 (Spain)
- Running time: 100 min
- Country: Spain
- Language: Spanish

Pasaje al amanecer is a 2016 Spanish drama film directed by Andreu Castro and starred by Nicolás Coronado, Iria Calero and Annette Duran. It is the film debut of Andreu Castro.

It is based on the Christmas Eve before the Second Battle of Fallujah in the Iraq War.

== Cast ==
- Iria Calero as Laia
- Nicolás Coronado as Javier
- Annette Duran as Mira
- Andrea Duro as Clara
- Ruth Díaz as Candela
- Carles Francino as Rubén
- Lola Herrera as Manuela
- Pol Monen as Camello
- Sergi Méndez as Misha
- Elvira Mínguez as Carmen
- Antonio Valero as Pedro

== Release ==
The film was presented at the Valladolid International Film Festival in 2016. Distributed by VerCine, it was released theatrically in Spain on 5 May 2017.

== See also ==
- List of Christmas films
- List of Spanish films of 2017
