= The Inquiry (2006 film) =

- Theatrical release poster
- Directed by: Giulio Base
- Written by: Valerio Massimo Manfredi
- Screenplay by: Andrea Porporati
- Story by: Suso Cecchi D'Amico; Ennio Flaiano
- Produced by: Fulvio Lucisano - Italian International Film; Rai Fiction; Enrique Cerezo - Producciones Cinematográficas
- Starring: Daniele Liotti; Dolph Lundgren; Mónica Cruz; Hristo Shopov; Ornella Muti; F. Murray Abraham; Max von Sydow; Anna Kanakis
- Music by: Andrea Morricone
- Production company: Enrique Cerezo Producciones
- Distributed by: 20th Century Fox (US); Millennium Films (non-US); Sony Pictures Releasing International (Spain)
- Release date: 28 December 2006 (Capri Hollywood Film Festival)
- Running time: 112 minutes
- Countries: Italy; Spain; United States; Bulgaria
- Languages: English; Italian
- Budget: €8 million

The Inquiry (also known as The Final Inquiry and Italian: L'inchiesta) is a 2006 Italian historical drama film directed by Giulio Base, and starring Daniele Liotti and Dolph Lundgren. It is a remake of the 1986 film of the same name.

== Plot ==
The story follows a fictional Roman tribune named Titus Valerius Taurus, a veteran of campaigns in Germania, who is sent to Judaea by the emperor Tiberius to investigate the possibility of the divinity of the recently crucified Jesus. Although sceptical early on, Taurus is eventually convinced by a Christian girl he meets there named Tabitha, and chooses to abandon the army and remain there with her.

== Cast ==
- Daniele Liotti as Titus Valerius Taurus
- Dolph Lundgren as Brixos
- Mónica Cruz as Tabitha
- Hristo Shopov as Pontius Pilate
- Christo Jivkov as Stephen
- Ornella Muti as Mary Magdalene
- F. Murray Abraham as Nathan
- Max von Sydow as Tiberius
- Anna Kanakis as Claudia Procula
- Enrico Lo Verso as Simon Peter
- Fabrizio Bucci as Jesus Christ

== See also ==
- List of historical drama films
- List of films set in ancient Rome
