= Little Bird (film) =

- Theatrical release poster
- Spanish: Pajarico
- Directed by: Carlos Saura
- Screenplay by: Carlos Saura
- Starring: Paco Rabal; Alejandro Martínez; Dafne Fernández
- Cinematography: José Luis López-Linares
- Edited by: Julia Juániz
- Music by: Alejandro Massó
- Production company: Filmart
- Distributed by: Columbia Tri-Star Films de España
- Release dates: 31 August 1997 (Montreal); April 1998 (Spain)
- Country: Spain
- Language: Spanish

Little Bird (Spanish: Pajarico) is a 1997 Spanish drama film written and directed by Carlos Saura which stars Paco Rabal, Alejandro Martínez, and Dafne Fernández.

== Plot ==
The plot follows Manuel, or "Manu", a 10-year-old boy from Madrid arriving in the province of Murcia for a summer stay with his uncles so he can be away from his parents who are separating. There he experiences puppy love with cousin Fuensanta.

== Cast ==
- Francisco Rabal as grandfather
- Alejandro Martínez as Manu
- Dafne Fernández as Fuensanta
- Eusebio Lázaro as uncle Fernando
- Manuel Bandera as uncle Juan
- Juan Luis Galiardo as uncle Emilio
- Eulalia Ramón as aunt Margarita
- María Luisa San José as aunt Beatriz
- Violeta Cela as aunt Lola
- Paulina Gálvez as aunt Marisa
- Rafael Álvarez "El Brujo" as vagabundo
- Eva Marciel as Loli
- Israel Rodríguez as Emilín

== Production ==
The story is freely based on Saura's childhood memories about his time in the Region of Murcia. José Luis López Linares worked as cinematographer whilst Alejandro Massó was responsible for the music and Julia Juániz for editing. The film is a Filmart production.

== Release ==
The film was presented in August 1997 at the 21st Montreal World Film Festival, where Saura won the Best Director award. It was released theatrically in April 1998.

== Reception ==
Leonard Klady of Variety wrote that the "story is undeniably genial and well observed, but lacks a central focus or a compelling dramatic tension".

José Luis Sánchez Noriega observed that despite being "a film with irregularities in its narrative development", Little Bird is still "a mature, serene movie, where the director reviews old themes with a more tender gaze".

== See also ==
- List of Spanish films of 1998
