= All Inclusive (2008 film) =

- Film poster
- Directed by: Rodrigo Ortuzar Lynch
- Written by: Julio Rojas; Paula del Fierro
- Produced by: Laura Imperiale; Patricio Lynch; Rodrigo Ortuzar Lynch
- Starring: Jesús Ochoa; Valentina Vargas
- Cinematography: Juan Carlos Bustamante
- Edited by: Danielle Hillios; Rodrigo Ortuzar Lynch; Marcela Sáenz
- Music by: Mauricio Dell
- Production company: Jazz Films
- Distributed by: Lionsgate
- Release dates: March 11, 2008 (Guadalajara Film Festival); July 10, 2009
- Running time: 95 minutes
- Countries: Chile; Mexico
- Language: Spanish

All Inclusive (Spanish: Todo incluido) is a 2008 Chilean-Mexican film. The film focuses on a Chilean family staying at a Mexican resort. During their time at the resort, they each have experiences affecting their lives, and their problems become apparent.

== Cast ==
- Jesús Ochoa as Gonzalo
- Martha Higareda as Camila
- Maya Zapata as Usnavy
- Ana Serradilla as Macarena
- Jaime Camil as Baldi
- Leonor Varela as Miranda
- Fernando Arroyo as Ian
- Mónica Cruz as Clemencia
- Eduardo Cuervo as Hector
- Patricio Lynch as a man with Miranda
- Valentina Vargas as Carmen
- Édgar Vivar as a taxi cab driver
- Jesús Zavala as Andres
