= The Heretic: A Novel of the Inquisition =

1998 novel by Miguel Delibes

- English language edition (2006)
- Author: Miguel Delibes
- Original title: El hereje
- Translator: Alfred MacAdam
- Language: Spanish
- Publisher: Ediciones Destino
- Publication date: 1998
- Publication place: Spain
- English publication date: 2005
- Pages: 497
- ISBN: 9788423330362

The Heretic: A Novel of the Inquisition (Spanish: El hereje) is a 1998 historical novel by the Spanish writer Miguel Delibes.

== Plot ==
The story is set in 16th-century Valladolid and is about the merchant Cipriano Salcedo. Salcedo discusses theology and ends up converting to Lutheranism. He becomes a central figure in the local Protestant Reformation and visits Germany to bring home literature considered heretical in Spain. His group is under threat from the Spanish Inquisition and needs to act in secret. When one local Lutheran is found out, the entire group becomes exposed.

== Reception ==
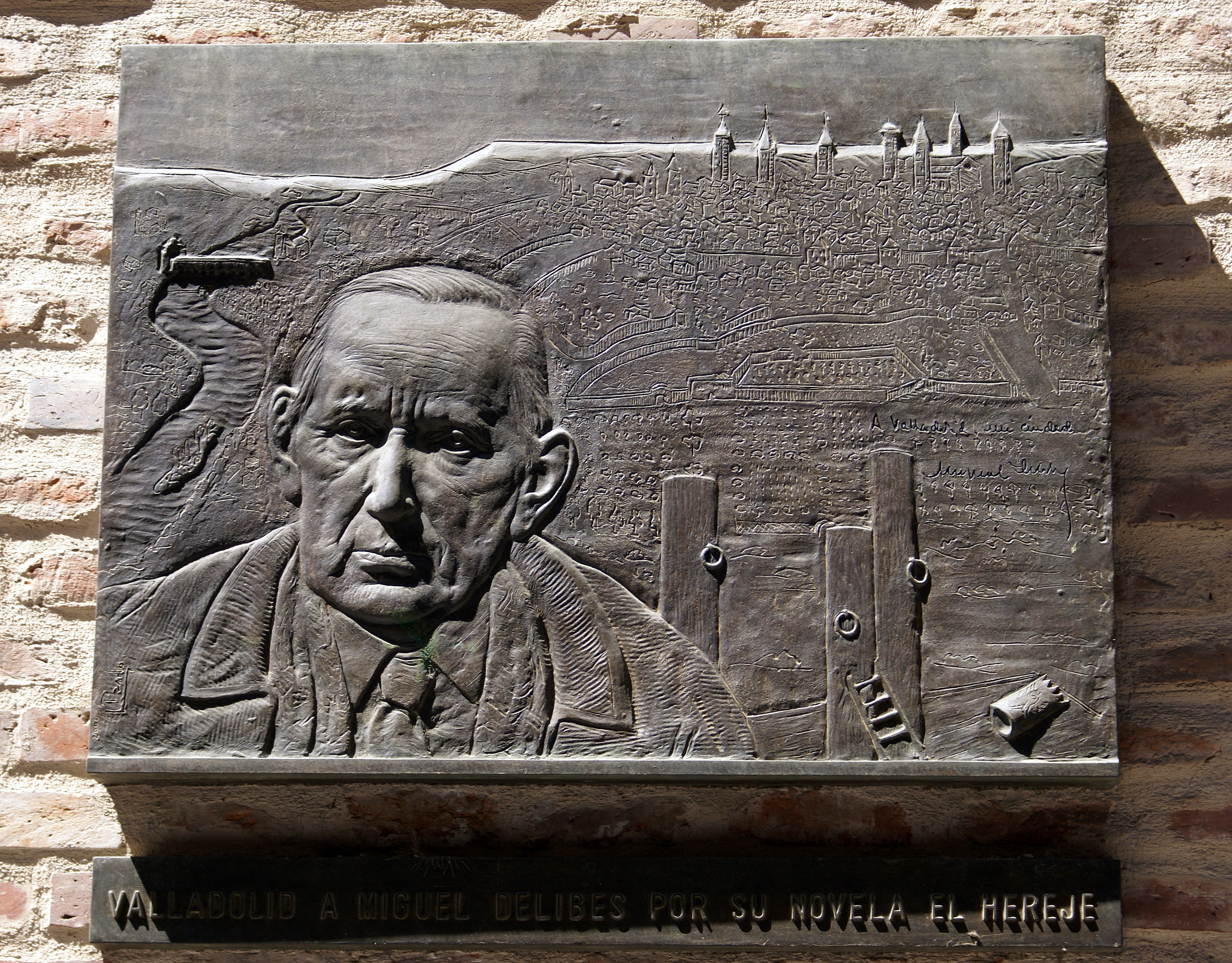
Plaque for Delibes in Valladolid that references The Heretic

Publishers Weekly called the book "an engrossing tapestry of historical and theological minutiae" where the city of Valladolid is the real main character. Alison McCulloch of The New York Times called the opening "a difficult entry point", describing the book overall as "absorbing" and "a poorly disguised history lesson" with "powerful final chapters". Kirkus Reviews called it "a poignant, although pale and rather bloated encomium to the early Reformation history" of Valladolid.

The book was awarded the National Literature Prize for Narrative.
