= Mónica Cruz =

Spanish actress

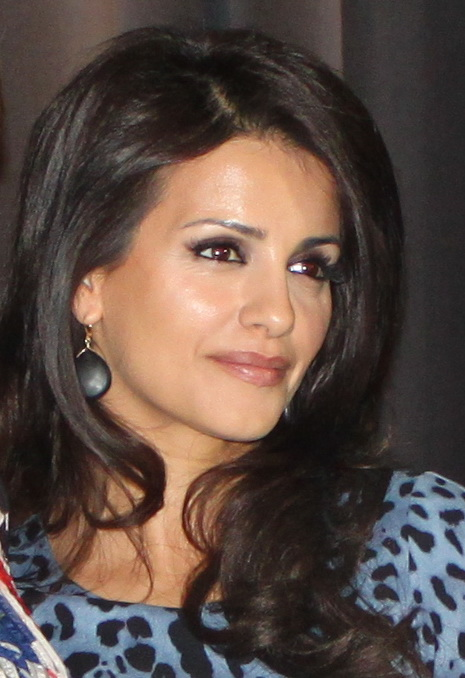
- Cruz in 2010
- Born: Mónica Cruz Sánchez; 14 March 1977 (age 49); Alcobendas, Spain
- Occupations: Actress, dancer, model
- Years active: 1999–present
- Children: 1
- Relatives: Penélope Cruz (sister)

Mónica Cruz Sánchez (born 14 March 1977) is a Spanish actress and dancer. She is the younger sister of actress Penélope Cruz. She has appeared in the films The Inquiry (2006), Last Hour (2008), Jerry Cotton (2010) and Iron Cross (2011).

== Early life ==
Mónica Cruz was born in the working-class town of Alcobendas, Madrid, the daughter of Encarna Sánchez, a hairdresser, and Eduardo Cruz (d. 2015), a retailer and auto mechanic. Throughout her childhood, she lived in Alcobendas. She is the middle child of three; older sister Penélope is an actress, and younger brother Eduardo (born 1986) is a singer. Her parents divorced in 1999, and her father remarried Carmen Moreno in 2003. Moreno gave birth to a girl, Salma Cruz, on 24 February 2012. Penélope and Mónica distinguished themselves as promising young dancers and both received professional training; Penélope attended Spain's National Conservatory while Mónica enrolled in The Royal Academy of Dance to study traditional ballet and flamenco.

== Career ==
Upon graduating from the academy, Cruz joined Joaquín Cortés' flamenco dance company. She stayed with the company for seven years until, in 2002, she left dancing to pursue a career in acting. In 2005, she starred in the Spanish television show Un Paso Adelante alongside Beatriz Luengo, Miguel Ángel Muñoz, Pablo Puyol and Silvia Marty. She portrayed Tabitha in the historical drama film The Inquiry (2006). Cruz landed the role of Detective Rosa Mulero in the crime drama film Last Hour (2008) alongside DMX and Paul Sorvino. She also appeared in films Asterix at the Olympic Games (2008), All Inclusive (2008), Jerry Cotton (2010) and Iron Cross (2011).

In 2010, her sister Penélope was pregnant while filming scenes for Pirates of the Caribbean: On Stranger Tides. Towards the latter half of shooting, her pregnancy was quite apparent, so the filmmakers devised creative methods of shooting around it. Due to her strong resemblance to Penélope, Cruz was hired to stand-in for the wider-angle footage, while Penélope was featured in the close up shots, where her visage was most discernable. In 2012, she appeared in a television commercial for the video game New Super Mario Bros. 2.

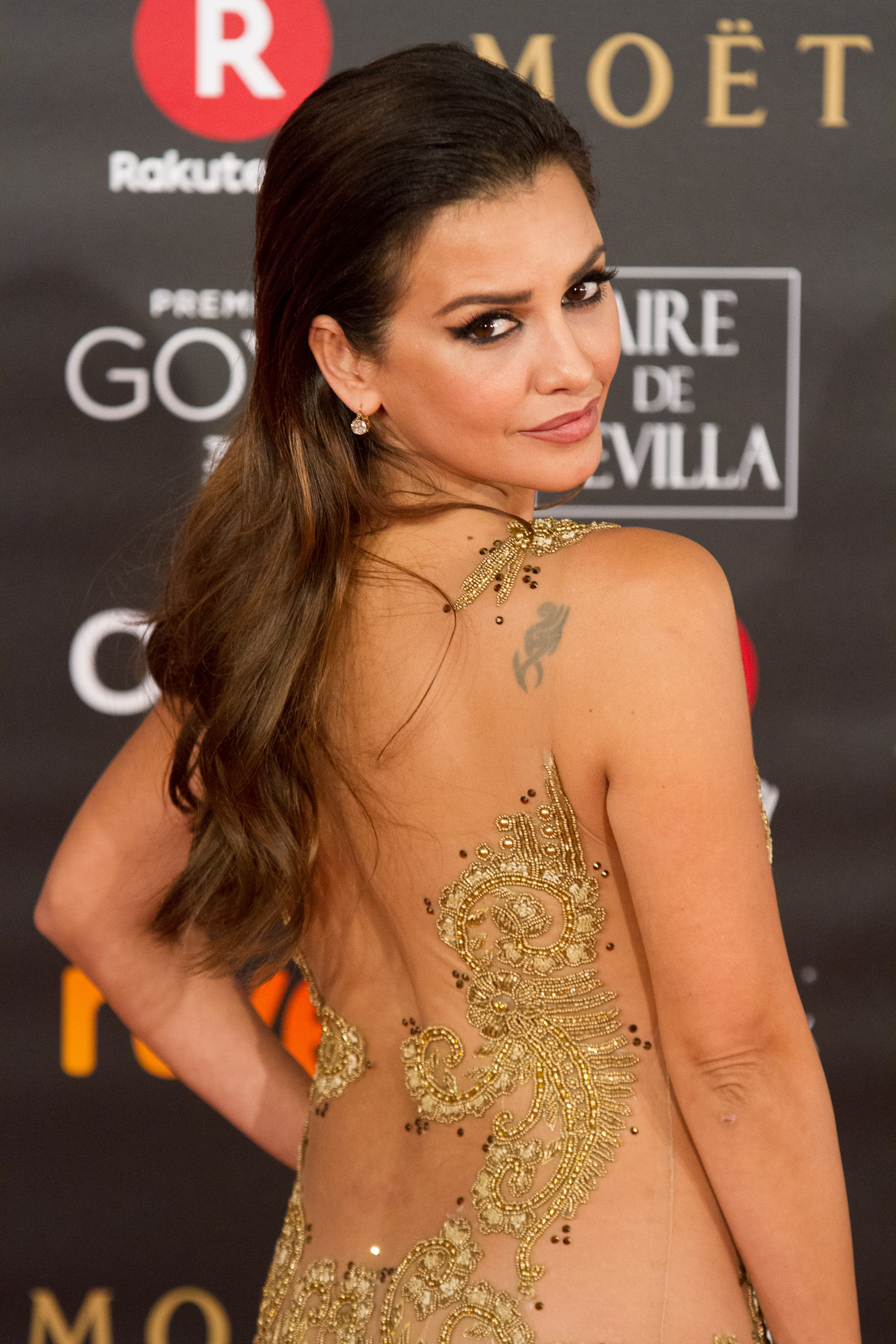
Cruz at the 2018 Goya Awards

In 2017, Cruz appeared in the music video for British band Jamiroquai's "Cloud 9" from their album Automaton. She also took part in Spanish television series Velvet Colección, where she plays Carmela Cortés, a gypsy flamenco dancer. She shot the second season at the end of 2018. In 2021, Cruz had a guest role as Irene in the Spanish comedy television series La que se avecina.

In 2022, she portrayed Silvia Jáuregui in UPA Next, a reboot of the Spanish musical drama series Un paso adelante.

=== Fashion and modelling ===
In 2007, Cruz and her sister designed a 25-piece Urban and Evening wear collection for Spanish clothing retailer Mango. The sisters have previously designed a collection of jewelry and handbags for Japanese fashion house Samantha Thavasa. Cruz and her sister created two collections for Swiss retailer Charles Vögele in 2010 and 2011. The Spring/Summer 2011 collection, titled "Biaggini Violett" became available in Europe and included denim shorts, striped tops, blazers and dresses. The pair teamed up again 2013 to design a lingerie line titled L'Agent for British lingerie retailer Agent Provocateur. She also modelled for Agent Provocateur's Autumn/Winter 2012–13 campaign. In November 2012, the sisters signed a three-year endorsement deal with Spanish luxury fashion house Loewe, and appeared in advertising campaigns and designed a handbag for the brand. In 2018, she launched a jewellery collection titled "Rock Star" for Majorica. Part of the proceeds from sales of the Rock Star collection benefited the Fero Foundation, a private foundation that helps the development of cancer research.

In September 2023, Penélope Cruz announced on Instagram, that she has designed a capsule collection for Geox with Mónica Cruz. The collection was released for Spring/Summer 2024 season.

Cruz has graced the cover of several international fashion magazines, including Mexico's Cosmopolitan and Vanidades; Spain's Elle, Mujerhoy, Women's Health and Glamour and Holland's L'Officiel. In July 2019, Cruz was a cover girl and guest editor for Baszari Journal's Haute Summer Special issue. She has appeared in advertisements for Betsson, Nescafe, Gabriella Vivaldi, TechnoMarine, Once, Hokana sunglasses, Majorica jewelry and Kypers eyewear.

List of fashion and beauty collections by Mónica Cruz
Year	Title	Brand	Notes
2007	Samantha Thavasa by Penelope & Monica Cruz	Samantha Thavasa	Handbag collection
2007	The Penelope and Monica Cruz Collection	Mango	Clothing collection
2010–11	The Biaggini Violett Collection	Charles Vögele	Clothing collection
2013	The L'Agent Collection	Agent Provocateur	Lingerie line
2013	The Cruz Collection	Loewe	Handbag collection
2018–present	Monica Cruz Collection	Majorica	Jewelry collection
2024	Geox by Penélope and Mónica Cruz	Geox	An apparel and footwear collection

== Personal life ==
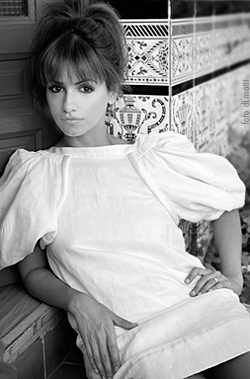
Mónica Cruz at her dance studio in Madrid in July 2007.

She gave birth to her only child, Antonella Cruz Sánchez, on 14 May 2013. Her daughter was conceived via artificial insemination and has no legal father.

Cruz loves flamenco dancing, saying "dancing is my first passion. It teaches a wonderful discipline and that discipline stays with you. My sister and I talk all the time about how much it has helped us."

== Filmography ==
Television and film roles
Year	Title	Role	Notes
1996	Pasión Gitana	Dancer	Documentary film
1999	The Girl of Your Dreams		Credited as choreographer
2002–2005	Un Paso Adelante	Silvia Jáuregui	81 episodes
2006	The Inquiry	Tabitha	
2007	Caminando	Mary Carmen Maya	
2008	Last Hour	Detective Rosa Mulero	
2008	Asterix at the Olympic Games	Esmeralda	
2008	All Inclusive	Clemencia	
2008	Susurros	Clara	Short film
2010	9 meses	Inma	
2010	Jerry Cotton	Malena	
2011	Iron Cross	Gaby	
2011–2013	Águila Roja	Mariana	20 episodes
2011	Pirates of the Caribbean: On Stranger Tides	Angelica	Body double for Penélope Cruz
2016	Top Dance	Herself	Jury Member; 4 episodes
2017	El hormiguero	Herself	Panelist; 5 episodes
2017–2018	Velvet Colección	Carmela Cortés	13 episodes
2020	El pueblo	Adriana	Episode: "Episode #2.7"
2020	Madres. Amor y vida	Carmen Irujo	9 episodes
2021	La que se avecina	Irene	8 episodes
2021	Family Feud: La batalla de los famosos	Herself	Contestant; Episode: "Física o Química vs. Un paso adelante"
2021	The Watch	Herself	Host
2022	Historias de UPA Next	Silvia	3 episodes
2022–2023	UPA Next	Silvia Jáuregui	8 episodes
2023	Pasapalabra	Herself	Contestant; Episode: "Episode dated 15 May 2023"
2023	Drag Race España	Herself	Guest judge (Season 3); Episode: "El Mago Precoz"

Music video roles
Year	Song	Artist
1994	"Un mundo separado por el mismo dios"	Nacho Cano
2006	"Cosas que contar"	Eduardo Cruz
2017	"Cloud 9"	Jamiroquai

== Awards and nominations ==
Year	Association	Category	Work	Result
2007	Capri Hollywood International Film Festival	Capri Fiction Award	The Inquiry	Won
