= The Holy Innocents (Delibes novel) =

1981 novel by Miguel Delibes

The Holy Innocents (1981) is a novel by Miguel Delibes about the everyday life on a farm in Extremadura during the Franco dictatorship.

== Plot ==
Miguel Delibes tells the story of a peasant family during the Franco regime in Spain, living on a hacienda in Extremadura, one of the country's poorest and most backward regions. The family consists of a father, mother, and four children, and also includes Azarías, an intellectually disabled farmhand who is characterized as innocent and has a speech impediment. He devotes himself entirely to raising a small jackdaw.

Life on the estate follows a rigid hierarchy: some rule while others obey. The main house hosts family celebrations, hunting trips, and parties. During one such hunting trip, the landowner Iván shoots Azarías's bird with his shotgun. Azarías then hangs the landowner.

The author provides a direct portrayal of the harsh lives of dependent agricultural workers in a dark and archaic world, where mutual solidarity is the only means of survival available to the oppressed. After the landowner has long ignored the hardships of the agricultural workers and household staff, Azarías's violent response can be seen as an almost inevitable consequence of the feudal power structures.

== Adaptation ==
A Spanish film adaptation was released in 1984, directed by Mario Camus.
