= 20 Centimeters =

2005 Spanish film

- Film poster
- Spanish: 20 centímetros
- Directed by: Ramón Salazar
- Written by: Ramón Salazar
- Produced by: José María Calleja; Iker Monfort
- Cinematography: Ricardo de Gracia
- Edited by: Teresa Font
- Music by: Najwa Nimri
- Release dates: April 2005 (Málaga); 10 June 2005
- Running time: 112 minutes
- Countries: Spain; France
- Languages: English; Spanish; French
- Box office: $434.000

20 Centimeters (Spanish: 20 centímetros) is a 2005 Spanish-French film about a narcoleptic transgender woman's life as she works to get the surgery to fix her "20 centímetros" problem. The film was written and directed by Ramón Salazar, and stars Mónica Cervera as Marieta and Pablo Puyol as Raúl, the man who loves "all" of Marieta. The film premiered at the 2005 Málaga Film Festival.

== Plot ==
Marieta (Mónica Cervera), a transgender woman, works as a prostitute in the city of Madrid to save money for a sex change operation. Her narcoleptic spells cause her to fall asleep at any sudden moment, and each time she dreams she is the star of musical numbers where she is free to sing and dance as her true self. Marieta meets a man who works at the market, Raúl (Pablo Puyol), and he loves her with her appendage. This creates a conflict for Marieta, who is happy about her new found love, yet so desperately wants her operation to feel like her whole true self.

== Cast ==
- Mónica Cervera as Marieta
- Pablo Puyol as Raúl / El reponedor
- Miguel O'Dogherty as Tomás
- Concha Galán as Berta
- Pilar Bardem as La Candelaria
- Rossy de Palma as La Frío - Ice Box
- Lola Dueñas as Rebeca mayor
- Juan Sanz as Gustavo
- Richard Shaw as Paulito
- Najwa Nimri as La Conejo
- María Lalane as Maestra
- Inma Olmos as La Malfollá
- Pepa Charro as Graziella / Dama de honor #1
- Pep Noguera as Superior
- Cayetana Márquez as Pili La Pelos
- Jesús Lena Fuster as La Chini / Dama de honor #2
- Macarena Gómez as Rebeca menor
- La China Patino as La Trico
- Fanny de Castro as Madre del Reponedor
- Vicente Haro as Padre del Reponedor
- Agustín Galiana

== Reception ==
On Rotten Tomatoes the film has an approval rating of 44% based on reviews from 16 critics.

== Awards ==
- Locarno International Film Festival (2005)
  - Nominee (Golden Leopard ): Ramón Salazar
  - Nominee (Youth Jury Award): Ramón Salazar
- Miami Gay and Lesbian Film Festival (2006)
  - Winner (Special Jury Award): Ramón Salazar
- Málaga Spanish Film Festival (2006)
  - Winner (Best Make-up): Ana Lozano
  - Winner (Critics Award): Ramón Salazar
  - Winner (Silver Biznaga/ Best Music): Najwa Nimri, Pascal Gaigne
  - Nominee (Golden Biznaga): Ramón Salazar
- Verzaubert - International Gay & Lesbian Film Festival (2006)
  - Winner(Rosebud/ Best Film): Ramón Salazar

== See also ==
- List of Spanish films of 2005
- List of French films of 2005
