= Lola Herrera =

Spanish actress

The Most Excellent Lola Herrera
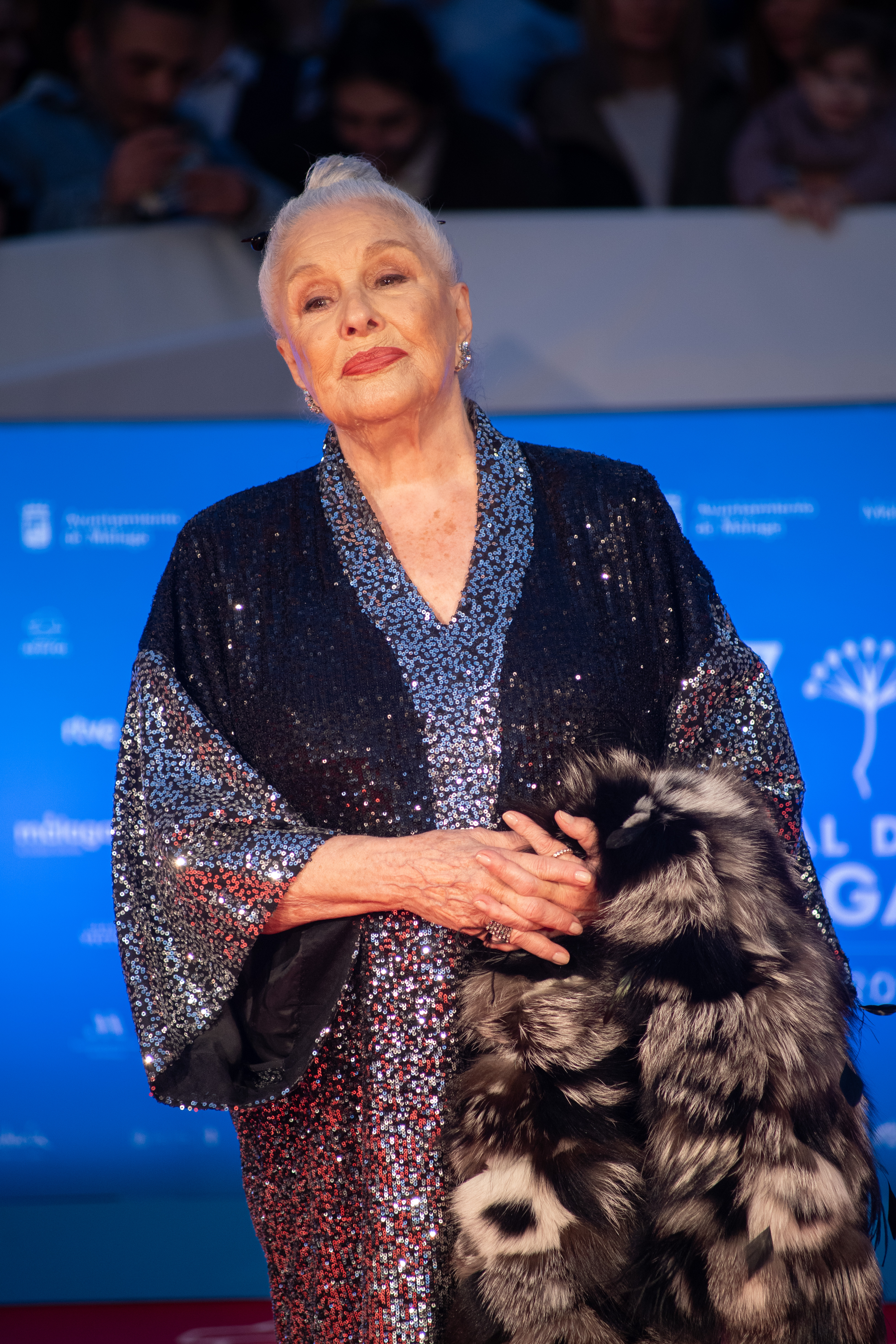
- Herrera in 2024
- Born: María Dolores Herrera Arranz; 30 June 1935 (age 90); Valladolid, Spain
- Occupation: Actress
- Years active: 1964–present
- Spouse: Daniel Dicenta (1960–1967)
- Children: 2, including Natalia

María Dolores Herrera Arranz (born 30 June 1935), better known as Lola Herrera, is a Spanish actress.

== Biography ==
Lola Herrera was born in Valladolid on 30 June 1935. She started in the world of music, but in the 1950s, she went to Madrid. She made her big screen debut in The Portico of Glory (1953).

In 1960, she married actor Daniel Dicenta, with whom she had two children (Natalia and Daniel). After a tortuous relationship, Dicenta abandoned her in 1967, at a time divorce was not legal in Spain.

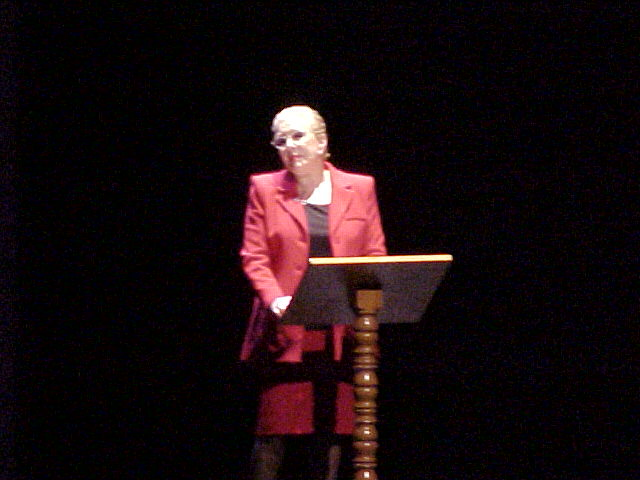
Herrera in 48 voces in Puerto del Rosario, Fuerteventura on 29 January 2001.

In the 1970s, she took part in several theatrical plays for Televisión Española. She was one of the habitual actors of the cast of Estudio 1 and collaborated with Chicho Ibáñez Serrador in Historias para no dormir (1968). She also worked as a voice actress in dubbing Spanish versions made in studios like Cineson or Exa (Madrid).

She is mainly known for her appearances in television series like La casa de los líos El grupo or Un paso adelante, but she has taken part in several movies like El amor perjudica seriamente la salud, and in theatrical plays like Cinco horas con Mario, based in a Miguel Delibes novel.

== Selected filmography ==
=== Television ===
- Un paso adelante (2002–2005)
- La casa de los líos (1997–2000)
- Paraíso
  - El momento de la verdad (August 16, 2000)
- El grupo (2000)
- El Señor Villanueva y su gente (1979)
- La barraca (1979)
- Las Viudas (1977)
- El quinto jinete
  - Mister George (January 1, 1976)
- El Teatro
  - Hay una luz sobre la cama (October 28, 1974)
  - Verano y humo (November 25, 1974)
- Ficciones
  - Los ojos de la pantera (May 20, 1974)
- Noche de teatro
  - Los tres etcéteras de Don Simón (May 3, 1974)
- Historias de Juan Español
  - Juan Español, aprensivo (November 22, 1972)
  - Juan Español y Lolita (October 1, 1973)
- Las doce caras de Eva
  - Acuario (January 1, 1972)
- Del dicho al hecho
  - El que a hierro mata, a hierro muere (May 26, 1971)
- Hora once
  - Yanko, el músico (May 6, 1971)
  - Adolescencia (February 19, 1972)
  - El recluta (March 11, 1972)
  - Las paredes oyen (October 29, 1973)
- Juegos para Mayores
  - Gente divertida (March 1, 1971)
- Sospecha
  - La trampa (November 9, 1970)
  - Mientras llega la noche (January 9, 1971)
- La risa española
  - Todos eran de Toronto (June 20, 1969)
  - Qué solo me dejas (July 18, 1969)
- Pequeño estudio
  - La herida (January 10, 1969)
  - Los zapatos (June 25, 1969)
- El Premio
  - La saga (December 2, 1968)
- Fábulas
  - El cuervo y el zorro (April 14, 1968)
- Historias para no dormir
  - La casa (January 1, 1968)
  - El trasplante (March 15, 1968)
- Las doce caras de Juan
  - Aries (December 2, 1967)
- La otra música
  - La noticia (October 8, 1967)
- Doce cuentos y una pesadilla
  - Por favor, compruebe el futuro (September 16, 1967)
- Teatro de siempre, several theatrical plays from 1964 to 1978.

=== Film ===
- Cristina Guzmán (1968)
- La Graduada (1971)
- The Cannibal Man (1972)
- La próxima estación (1982)
- Love Can Seriously Damage Your Health (1997)
- Pasaje al amanecer (2017)

== Awards ==
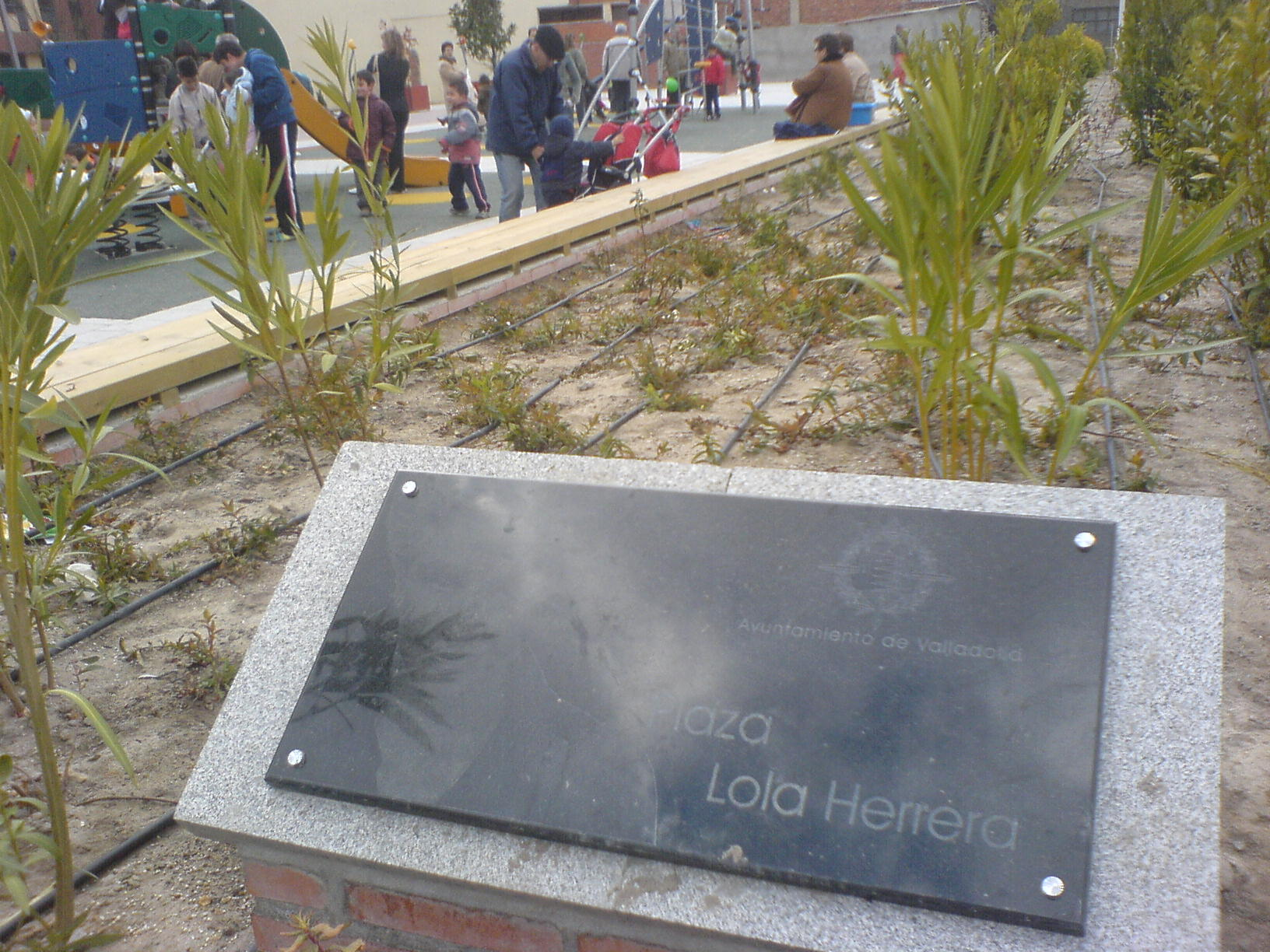
'Plaza Lola Herrera' in Las Delicias, Valladolid.

=== Stage ===
- Max de las artes escénicas, Solas in 2006,
- Fotogramas de Plata, Solas in 2006
- Fotogramas de Plata, Cinco horas con Mario in 2005
- Premio Ercilla de Teatro for her complete career in stages.

=== Television ===
- TP de Oro Best Actress for Las Viudas, 1977
- TP de Oro Best Actress for La barraca, 1979

== Honours ==
- Gold Medal of Merit in Labour (2 December 2006).
