= Pablo Puyol =

Spanish actor, dancer and singer (born 1975)

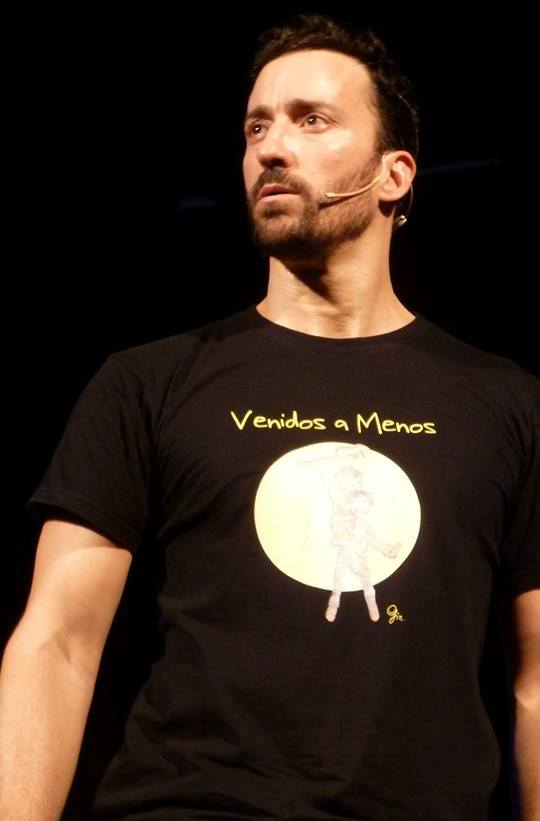

Background information
- Born: Pablo Puyol Ledesma; 26 December 1975 (age 50); Málaga, Spain
- Genres: R&B; latin pop; soul
- Occupations: Actor; dancer; singer

Pablo Puyol Ledesma (born 26 December 1975) is a Spanish actor, dancer and singer. He is most known for appearing as Hugo in 45 episodes of Arrayán TV Series and in 24 episodes of Ciega a citas as Alberto.

== Biography ==
He was born in Málaga. After starting biology, he studied drama in the Escuela Superior de Arte Dramático de Málaga. He started as a professional actor in Madrid with the musical Grease.

He made roles in several TV series and short films before he joined the famous Antena 3 TV series Un paso adelante thanks to his talents in dancing and singing.

In 2000, he played the role of Asier in En malas compañías (named in English as Doors Cut Down), then in 2005 he played the role of Raul, "el reponedor" in the movie 20 Centimeters which won many prizes at the Málaga International Film Festival, he also played part in the movie Clandestinos starring with actor Israel Rodrigues.

On 6 February 2014 he appeared in the show Tu cara me suena (on Antena 3), the Spanish version of Your Face Sounds Familiar, as a guest impersonating Vanilla Ice, and he was postulated as a favorite to appear in the fourth season of the contest. On 29 July 2015 the rumors were confirmed, and it became official his participation in the fourth season of Tu cara me suena where he eventually finished third.

== Personal life ==
He is a vegan from 2012 and he collaborates with the International Organization in defense of the Animal Equality.

In 2018, he dated journalist Irene Junquera.

== Filmography ==
Film
Year	Film	Director	Role	Other notes
2000	Doors Cut Down	Antonio Hens	Asier	(Short)
2002	Boys Briefs 2	Barry Dignam and Antonio Hens	Asier (segment "Doors cut down")	(Video)
2002	Courts mais Gay: Tome 3	Andrew Abrahams and Philippe Becq	Asier (segment "Mauvaises fréquentations")	
2002	Stones	Ramón Salazar	Entrenador	
2003	Tánger	Juan Madrid	Rai	
2005	McGuffin	Juanma R. Pachón		(Short)
2005	20 Centimeters	Ramón Salazar	Raúl / El reponedor	main role
2006	No te duermas	Salvador Jiménez	Auxiliar	(Short)
2007	No quiero	Virginia Rodríguez		(Short)
2007	Clandestinos	Antonio Hens	Lucas	
2007	Boystown	Juan Flahn	Víctor	main role
2008	Prime Time	Luis Calvo Ramos	Miguel Ángel	
2008	The Conspiracy	Antonio del Real	Insausti	
2010	The Anguish	Jordi Mesa González		
2012	Gallino, the Chicken System	Carlos Atanes	Warren S. Thornton	
2014	Caen piedras del cielo	R. Robles Rafatal		(Short)

Television series
Year	Television series	Role	Other notes
2002-2005	Un paso adelante	Pedro Salvador	TV series, 73 episodes
2004	Casi perfectos	La visita de los suegros de Andrés	TV series, 1 episode
2006	Tirando a dar	Víctor	TV series, 7 episodes
2008	Los Serrano	Nacho	TV series, 6 episodes
2008	Generación DF	Pelayo	TV series, 5 episodes
2010	Las chicas de oro	Martín	TV series, 1 episode
2010	La pecera de Eva	Germán	TV series, 5 episodes
2011	Vida loca	Francisco	TV series, 1 episode
2012	Stamos okupa2	Rodrigo	TV series, 1 episode
2012-2013	Arrayán	Hugo	TV series, 45 episodes
2013	Esposados	Rubén	TV series, 5 episodes
2013-2014	La que se avecina	Santi	TV series, 3 episodes
2014	Ciega a citas	Alberto	TV series, 24 episodes
2014	Sábado Sensacional	Various Characters	(TV movie)
2015	Gym Tony	Fernando	TV series, 2 episodes
2016	¿Qué fue de Jorge Sanz?	Pablo Puyol	TV series, 1 episode
2018	Entreolivos	Pablo	TV series, 11 episodes
