= Stones (film) =

- Theatrical release poster
- Spanish: Piedras
- Directed by: Ramón Salazar
- Written by: Ramón Salazar
- Produced by: Francisco Ramos
- Starring: Antonia San Juan; Najwa Nimri; Vicky Peña; Mónica Cervera; Ángela Molina
- Cinematography: David Carretero
- Edited by: Teresa Font
- Music by: Pascal Gaigne
- Production company: Alquimia Cinema
- Distributed by: Hispano FoxFilm
- Release dates: February 2002 (Málaga); 8 February 2002 (Spain)
- Country: Spain
- Language: Spanish

Stones (Spanish: Piedras) is a 2002 Spanish film directed and written by Ramón Salazar which stars Antonia San Juan, Najwa Nimri, Vicky Peña, Mónica Cervera, and Ángela Molina.

== Plot ==
The plot revolves around the lives of five women living in Madrid.

== Cast ==
- Antonia San Juan as Adela
- Ángela Molina as Isabel
- Najwa Nimri as Leire
- Vicky Peña as Maricarmen
- Lola Dueñas as Daniela
- Mónica Cervera as Anita
- María Casal as Martina
- Andrés Gertrúdix as Javier
- Enrique Alcides as Joaquín
- Daniele Liotti as Kun
- Rodolfo de Souza as Leonardo

== Release ==
The film was presented at the Málaga Film Festival in February 2002. It was released theatrically in Spain on 8 February 2002. It also screened at the 52nd Berlin International Film Festival.

== Reception ==
Mirito Torreiro of El País negatively assessed an "unhealthy gloating" in the pain of women.

Sheila Johnston of ScreenDaily wrote that "pedestrian is really the only word to describe [the film]".

== See also ==
- List of Spanish films of 2002
