= Miguel Delibes =

Spanish writer, journalist and novelist

The Most Excellent Miguel Delibes
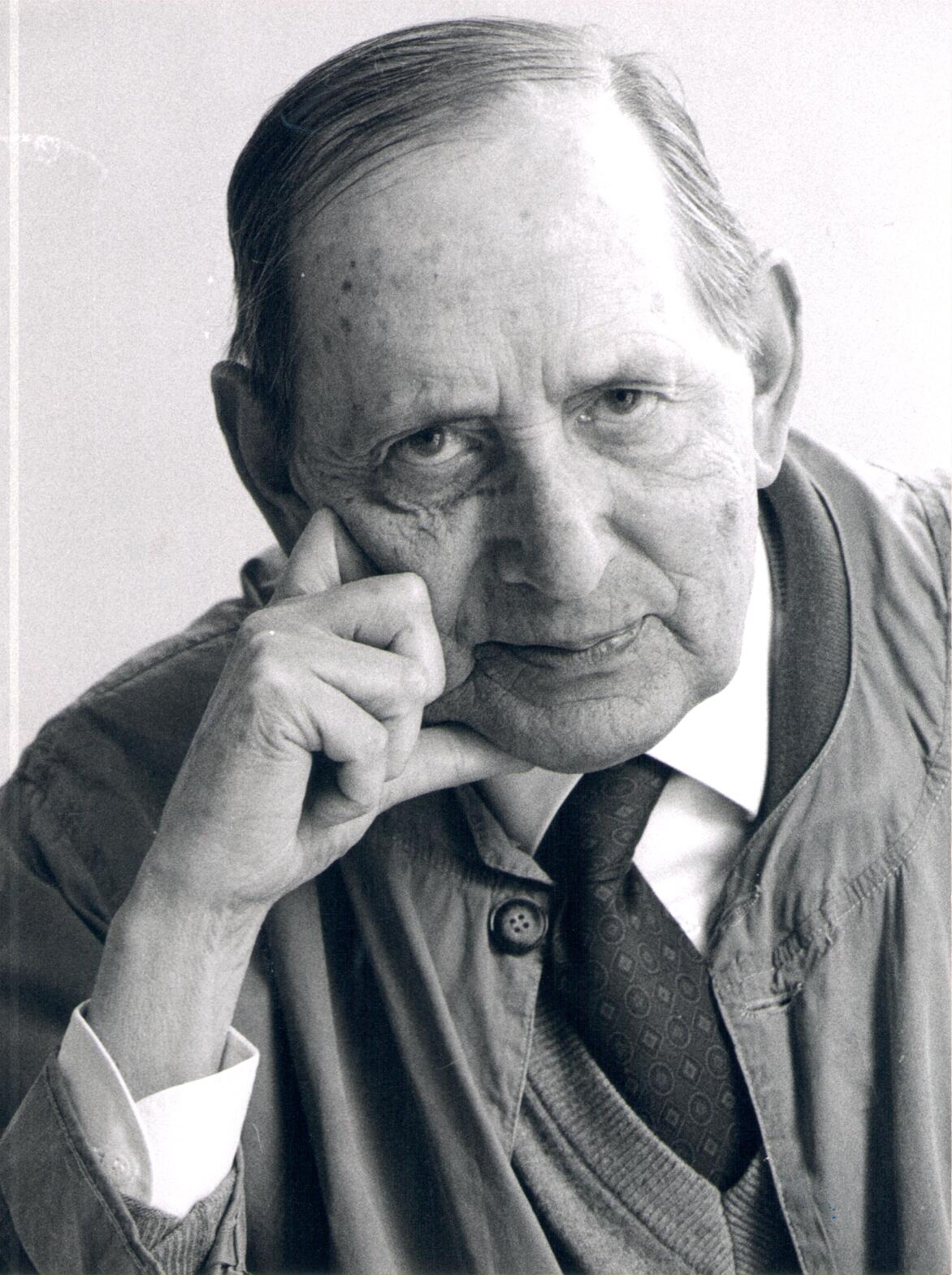
- Delibes in 1998
- Born: Miguel Delibes Setién; 17 October 1920; Valladolid, Spain
- Died: 12 March 2010 (aged 89); Valladolid, Spain
- Resting place: Cementerio del Carmen, Valladolid
- Occupations: Novelist, journalist, newspaper editor
- Spouse: Ángeles de Castro (m. 1946, d. 1974)
- Children: Miguel, Ángeles, Germán, Elisa, Juan, Adolfo & Camino.
- Writing career
- Language: Spanish
- Genres: Narrative fiction, Essays
- Notable work: El camino
- Literary movement: Post-civil war literature

Seat e of the Real Academia Española
- In office 25 May 1975 (Note: Elected on 1 February 1973) – 12 March 2010
- Preceded by: Julio Guillén Tato
- Succeeded by: Juan Gil Fernández

Miguel Delibes Setién (Spanish pronunciation: [miˈɣel deˈliβes]; 17 October 1920 – 12 March 2010) was a Spanish novelist, journalist and newspaper editor associated with the Generation of '36 movement. From 1975 until his death, he was a member of the Royal Spanish Academy, where he occupied letter "e" seat. Educated in commerce, he began his career as a cartoonist and columnist. He later became the editor for the regional newspaper El Norte de Castilla before gradually devoting himself exclusively to writing novels.

He was a connoisseur of the flora and fauna of Castile and was passionate about hunting and the countryside. These were common themes in his writing, and he often wrote from the perspective of a city-dweller who remained connected with the rural world.

He was one of the leading figures of post-Civil War Spanish literature, winning numerous literary prizes. Several of his works have been adapted into plays or have been turned into films, winning awards at the Cannes Film Festival among others. He has been ranked with Heinrich Böll and Graham Greene as one of the most prominent Catholic writers of the second half of the twentieth century. He was deeply affected by the death of his wife in 1974. In 1998 he was diagnosed with colon cancer, from which he never fully recovered. He died in 2010.

== Biography ==
=== Early life and training ===
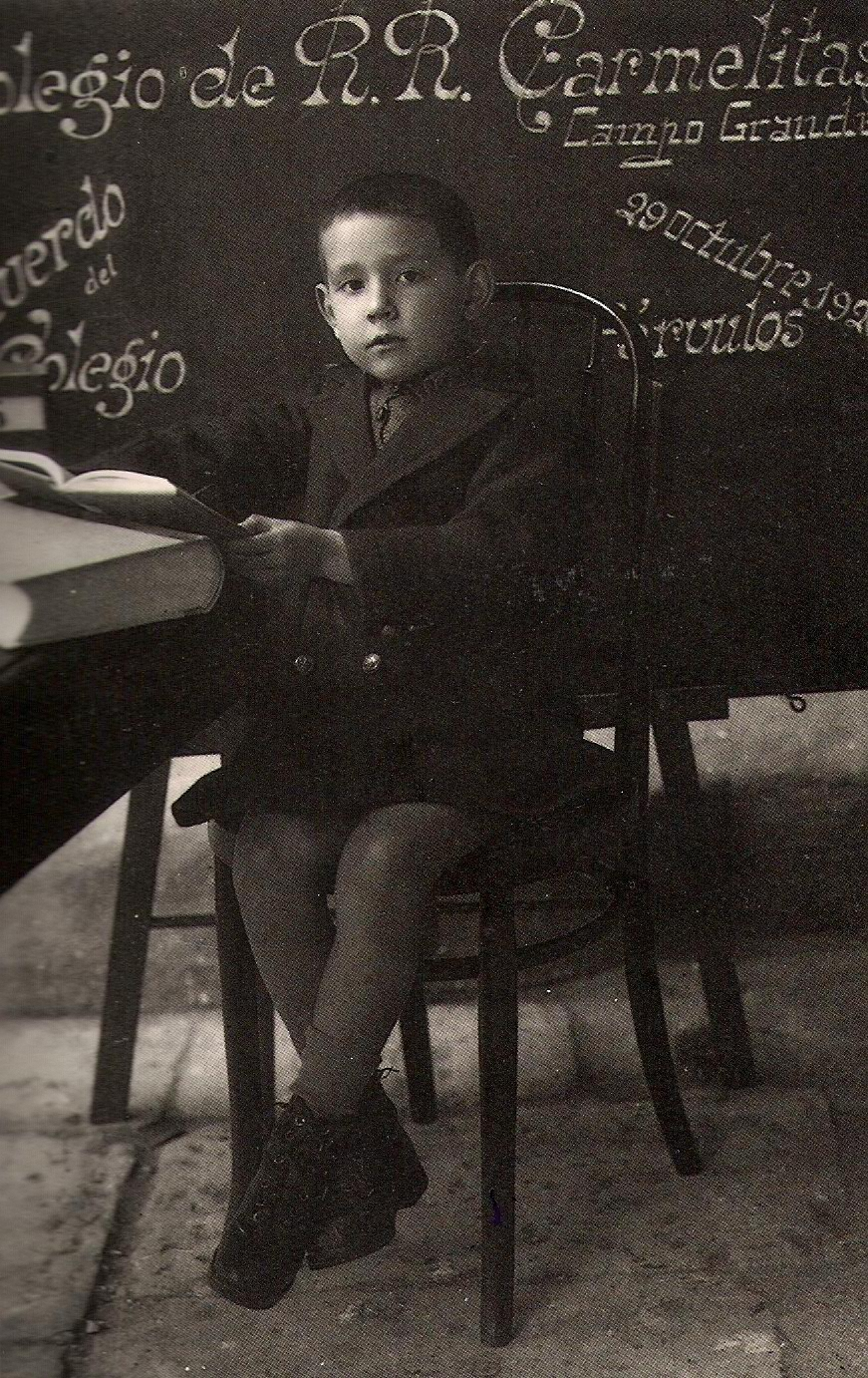
Miguel Delibes at age six in a school photograph of the Colegio de las Carmelitas of Valladolid.

Miguel Delibes was born in Valladolid on 17 October 1920, the third of eight children from the marriage between María Setién and Adolfo Delibes. His father was born and died in the Cantabrian town Molledo, where Miguel spent many summers. The writer was named an adopted son of Valladolid in 2009. The name Delibes was of French origin and came from Toulouse. Miguel's grandfather was the brother of the French composer Léo Delibes, and had moved to Spain to participate in the construction of the railway in Cantabria. His father was a law professor at the Valladolid Business School. Miguel attended the College of Our Lady of Lourdes in Valladolid. After the outbreak of the Spanish Civil War, he enlisted in the Navy on the Nationalist side in 1938. He served on the cruiser Canarias, which operated in the Mallorcan region. At the end of the war in 1939, he returned to his home town, where he studied commerce and law. He then enrolled at the Escuela de Artes y Oficios (School of Arts and Crafts) of Valladolid, where he honed his artistic skills. In 1941 he secured a job as a cartoonist with the leading newspaper of Valladolid, El Norte de Castilla.

On April 23, 1946, he married Ángeles de Castro, who later became one of his greatest literary inspirations. They spent their honeymoon in Molledo, Cantabria.

=== Early literary career ===
After his marriage, Delibes' literary career really started to take off, beginning a three-year period that defined his career. In 1947 he began writing his first novel, La sombra del ciprés es alargada (The cypress casts a long shadow), which won the Premio Nadal the following year, marking his emergence on the Spanish literary scene. His novel Aún es de día (It is still daytime) was published, heavily censored, in 1948.

His family grew during this same period. His son Miguel, who would later become a famous biologist, was born in 1947. His daughter Ángeles, who would also become a renowned biologist and researcher, was born the following year, and in 1949 his third child, Germán, was born.

In 1950, a new stage in the writer's literary career commenced. After suffering a bout of tuberculosis, he published El camino (The road), his third novel. The novel tells the discovery of life and the experiences of a boy who moves from the countryside to the city. The work constituted his final consecration in the Spanish post-war narrative. That year saw the birth of his daughter Elisa, who later became a graduate of Hispanic and French Studies.

In 1952, he was appointed deputy director of the newspaper El Norte de Castilla, and his battles with censorship became increasingly direct and frequent. The writer entered a new phase in his life in which he would publish a new work virtually every year, namely: Mi idolatrado hijo Sisí (My adored son Sissi) 1953, La partida (The departure) 1954, Diario de un cazador (Diary of a hunter) 1955 –Premio Nacional de Narrativa–, Un novelista descubre América (A novelist discovers America) 1956, Siestas con viento sur (Siestas with southern wind) 1957 –Fastenrath Award–, Diario de un emigrante (Diary of an emigrant) 1958, and La hoja roja (The red leaf), 1959. This last novel was existentialist in content and deals with a photographer who recalls his life on the brink of his retirement. In 1956, his son Juan Delibes was born. He would become a biologist like his siblings and fan of hunting and fishing like his father. In 1958, the writer was appointed director of El Norte de Castilla.

=== Literary apogee ===
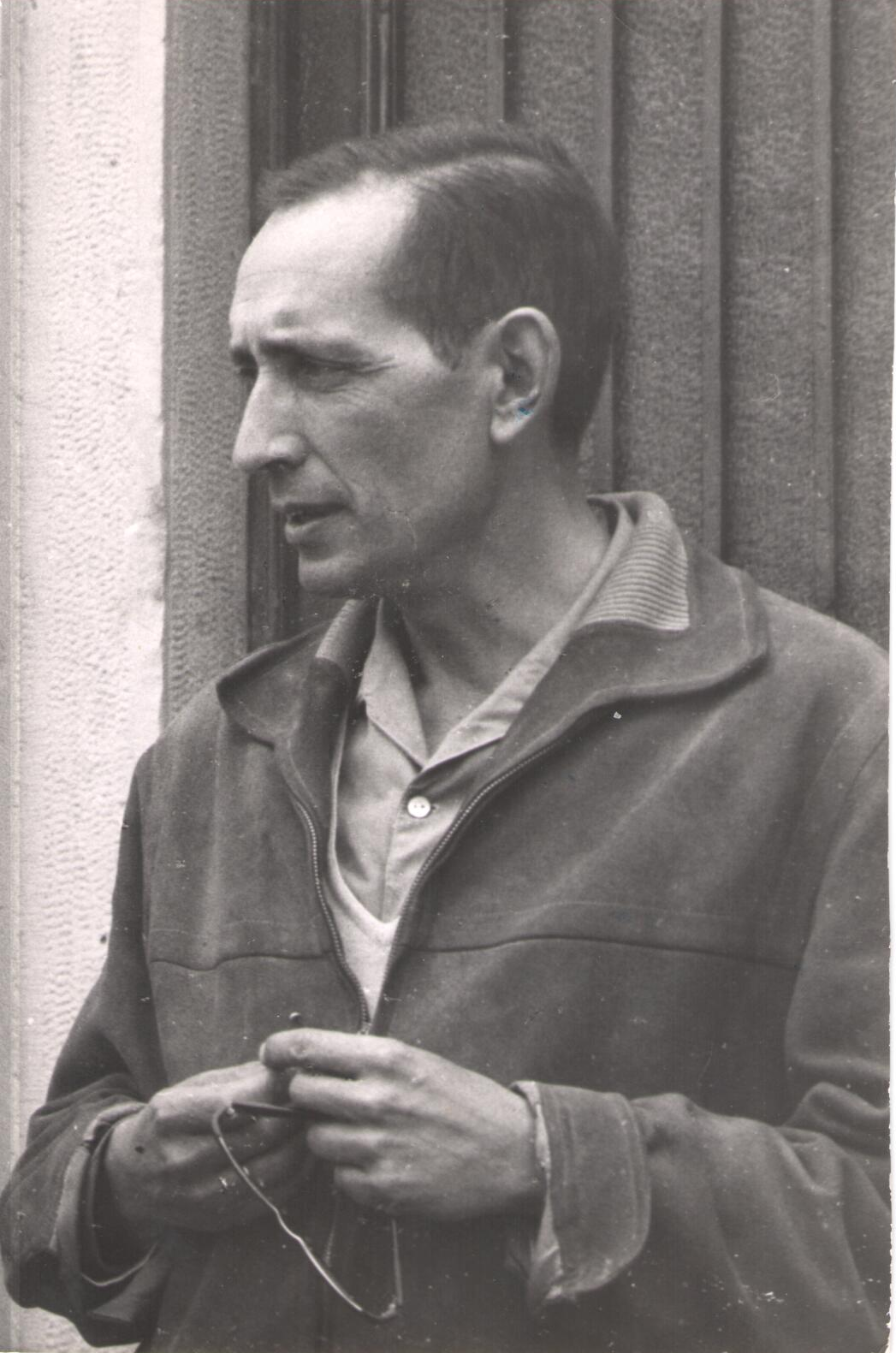
Miguel Delibes in the 1960s in his "refuge" of Sedano (Burgos).

The 1960s represented the heyday of Delibes' literary career. The period was marked by the birth of his sixth son, Adolfo (later a graduate in biology) and a visit to Germany, where he visited several universities. The literary period opened with the publication of Viejas historias de Castilla la Vieja (Old Tales of Old Castile) in 1960, and Por esos mundos (In these worlds) in 1961. In 1962, Delibes published Las ratas (The Rats), one of his masterpieces. It constructs a story from a series of autobiographical anecdotes which evoke the rural environment of a Castilian village that has disappeared. The book won the Premio de la Crítica (Critics Award for Castilian fiction). In the same year Camino, the last of his seven children, would be born. Camino later graduated in Philosophy and Letters. Also in that year, the film version of El camino, directed by Ana Mariscal, was shot. 1963 was a turbulent year: Delibes resigned on June 8 as director of El Norte de Castilla after several disagreements with Manuel Fraga, Minister of Information and Tourism. In 1964, he spent six months in the United States as a visiting professor in the Department of Foreign Languages and Literature of the University of Maryland. After his return, he wrote and published Cinco horas con Mario (Five Hours with Mario), which is considered his masterpiece. The novel is the monologue of a woman who holds a wake for her late husband while she recounts the memories of him. Other books published upon his return from the US included USA y yo (The United States and I) and La milana. In the following years he visited Czechoslovakia and published Parábola del náufrago (literally: The Parable of the Castaway, translated into English as The Hedge by Frances M. Lopez-Morillas). Later in the 1970s, he followed up with several books about hunting, an activity about which he was passionate, and stories. Subsequently, he published Un año de mi vida (A Year of my Life), a personal diary.

On 1 February 1973, Miguel Delibes was elected to the Royal Spanish Academy, occupying chair "e", which was left vacant after the death of Julio Guillén. That same year, in December, he was also elected to the Hispanic Society of America. Before the end of the year, he published El príncipe destronado (The dethroned prince), his eleventh novel. On 22 November 1974 his wife, Angela de Castro, died at the age of 50. Her death profoundly marked the writer for the rest of his life.

Finally, on 25 May 1975, he delivered his inaugural address to the Royal Spanish Academy. Damaso Alonso, one of the leading members of the Generation of '27 and then president of the Royal Spanish Academy handed the academic medal to Miguel Delibes His induction speech, which dealt with The meaning of progress from my work, which he later edited into a book entitled Un mundo que agoniza (A world that is agonizing). That same year, his twelfth novel Las guerras de nuestros antepasados (The Wars of our Ancestors) saw the light. In the next three years, he published several books on hunting and his only book about fishing, Mis amigas las truchas (My Friends the Trout). This time period closed with the publication of El disputado voto del señor Cayo (The Disputed Vote of Mr. Cayo), his thirteenth novel. In 1979, the stage adaptation of Five Hours with Mario premiered in Spain starring the leading actress of Valladolid, Lola Herrera. Due to its success, the play was revived several times. That year, he released Castilla, lo castellano, los castellanos (Castile, Castilian Culture, the Castilians), a narrative anthology.

=== 1980 and 1990: awards ===
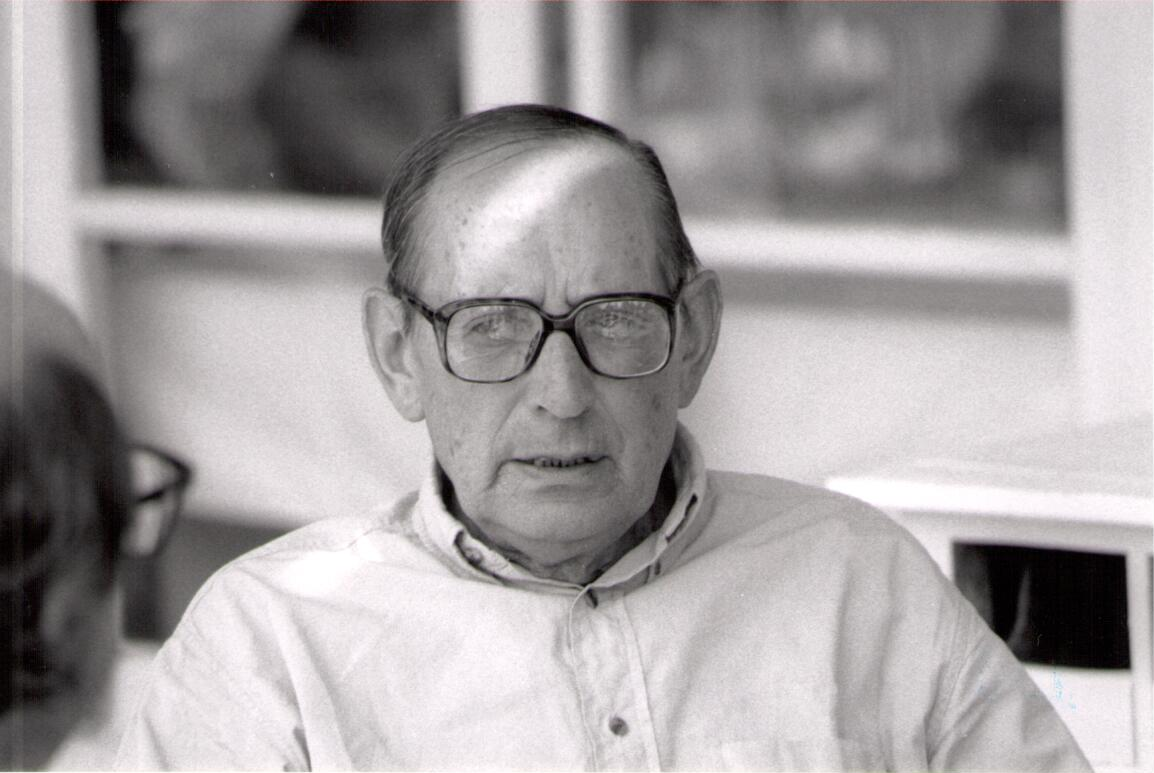
Delibes in El Escorial (July 1991).

In 1980, the International Booksellers Seventh Congress that was held in Valladolid paid tribute to the writer. The big title of this period was Los santos inocentes (The Holy Innocents), published in 1981. The book is a form of social radiography that recounts the degradation of a rural family through the actions of the caciques of rural Extremadura. In 1982, he received the Prince of Asturias Award for Literature, sharing it with Gonzalo Torrente Ballester; and participated in the Congress "A literature for man", held in Reggio Emilia, Italy. During this decade he published books on hunting, stories, and collections of newspaper articles. In 1983, he was inducted as Doctor honoris causa by the University of Valladolid. The following year, he was awarded the Castile and León Prize for Literature by the Regional Government. In the same year, Miguel Delibes was named "author of the year" by the Spanish booksellers who bestowed the Golden Book award on him in recognition. At the end of the year, The Holy Innocents was adapted into a film. The actors Alfredo Landa and Francisco Rabal received the actor's award at the Cannes Film Festival for their roles in the movie. In 1985, he published El tesoro (The Treasure) and received the Knight of Arts and Letters of the French Republic. In the following years he was named a favorite son of Valladolid, he published Castilla habla (Castile Speaks), got an honorary doctorate of the Complutense University of Madrid and attended the theatrical adaptation of works like The Red Leaf and The Wars of our Ancestors. His 1987 book Madera de héroe (The Stuff of Heroes) deals with the notion of heroism during the Spanish Civil War. It won the Premio Ciudad de Barcelona.

On 7 May 1990, he was awarded an honorary doctorate by Saarland University, Germany. A year later, on 30 May 1991, the Ministry of Culture awarded him the National Prize for Spanish Literature. The University of Málaga paid homage to him at the V Contemporary Spanish Literature Congress, under the title Miguel Delibes: the writer, his work and readers. That year, he published Señora de rojo sobre fondo gris (Lady in red on a grey background), a clear evocation of his wife. In the following year the Meeting with Miguel Delibes was held in Madrid. It was organized on the occasion of the National Prize for Spanish Literature and included a total of seven conferences and four round tables that dealt with the works of Miguel Delibes.

=== Literary halt and final years ===
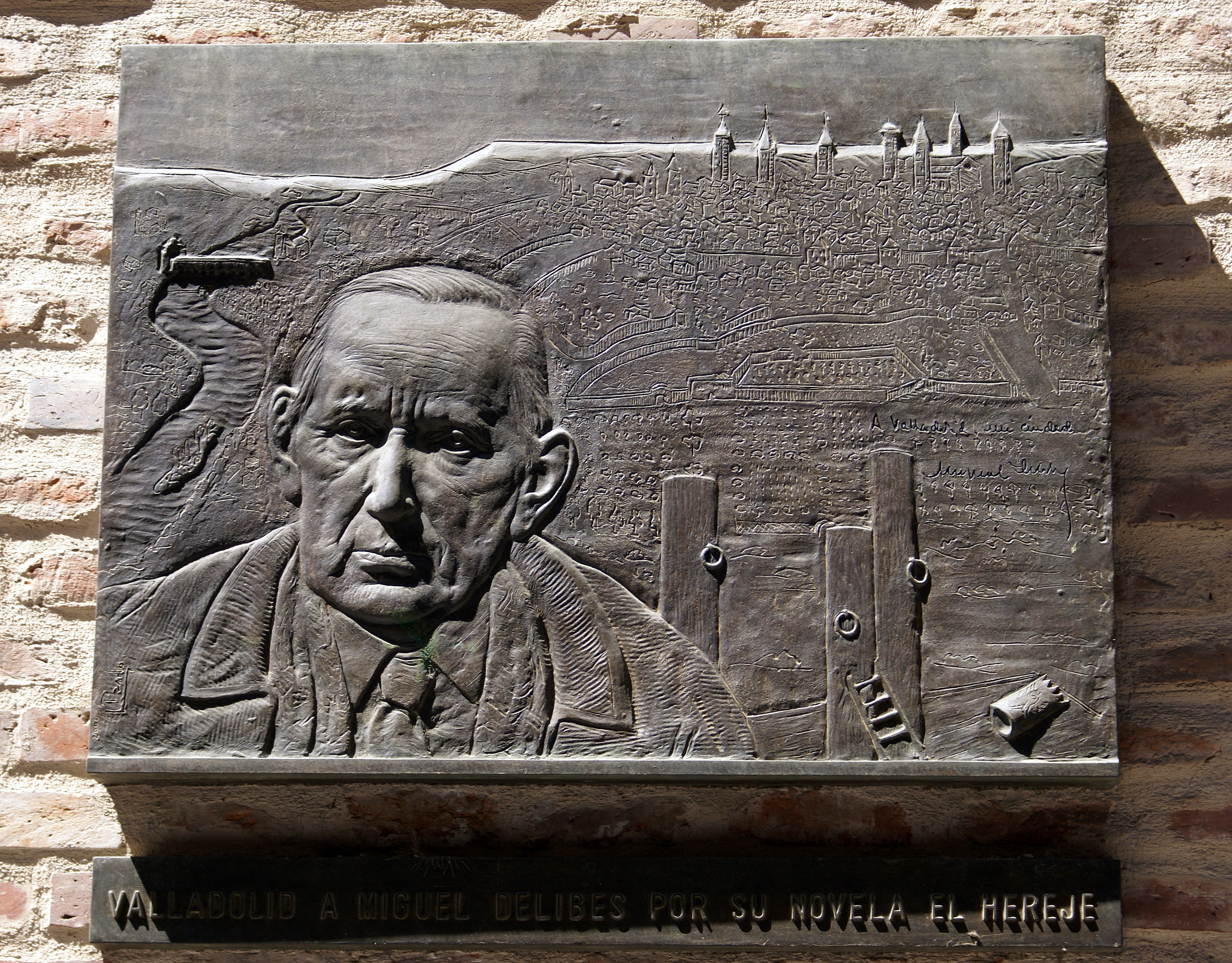
Plaque of Miguel Delibes installed by the city of Valladolid as a tribute to his novel The Heretic.

His last major work, El hereje (The Heretic), a tribute to Valladolid, was published in 1998 and was awarded the National Literature Prize for Narrative. When receiving the award, the author stated that at 79 years of age he "had hung up his writing tackle." At the beginning of the millennium, the Miguel Delibes Chair was founded. The chair has its seat at the universities of New York and Valladolid, and has as its objectives to promote the study of contemporary Spanish literature, make this literature known in the United States and disseminate it through new technologies.

Following the publication of The Heretic his writing career came virtually to a halt, mainly because of the colon cancer that affected the writer during the final phase of writing his last great novel. He was largely disabled and fell victim to an ever-greater apathy. His last book, La tierra herida (The wounded earth) published in 2005, takes the form of a dialogue between him and his eldest son, Miguel Delibes, former head of Doñana National Park. The book is a moving account of climate change. In 2007 he received the Quijote Prize for Spanish Literature, although in later years his literary production was practically nil, with just a few titles, such as De Valladolid (From Valladolid). Since he was disabled, Juan Carlos I and Sofia of Greece, the king and queen of Spain, personally visited the writer at his home in Valladolid after he was awarded the Vocento Prize for Human Values. He was recognized by his city with the creation of the Route of the Heretic based on his novel and the construction of the Centro Cultural Miguel Delibes, which is both a conservatory and auditorium as well as a convention center.

The president of the autonomous community of Castile and León gave him in November 2009 the Gold Medal of Castile and León in recognition of "his defense of Castilian" and described the author as a "master storyteller".

Similarly, the Junta of Castile and León, as well as numerous Spanish and international cultural and intellectual institutions proposed him repeatedly as a candidate for the Nobel Prize, the last time by the Society of Authors and Publishers in 2010 along with Ernesto Cardenal and Ernesto Sabato.

=== Politics ===
Although Delibes fought with the Nationalists during the Spanish Civil War, he was appalled by the level of repression, turned against Franco, and worked to restore democracy to Spain. In 1963, he was forced to resign from his position as director of the newspaper El Norte de Castilla for refusing to follow official instructions limiting the freedom of the press. In Delibes's view, the Reformation had enriched the Catholic faith. He held the opinion that the Spanish Civil War could've been avoided if the Church had a reformist pope like John XXIII who reconciled with modernity at the time. He has been described as a liberal Catholic, who sought to find a middle ground in between liberation theology and the authoritarian Catholicism of Franco.

=== Death ===
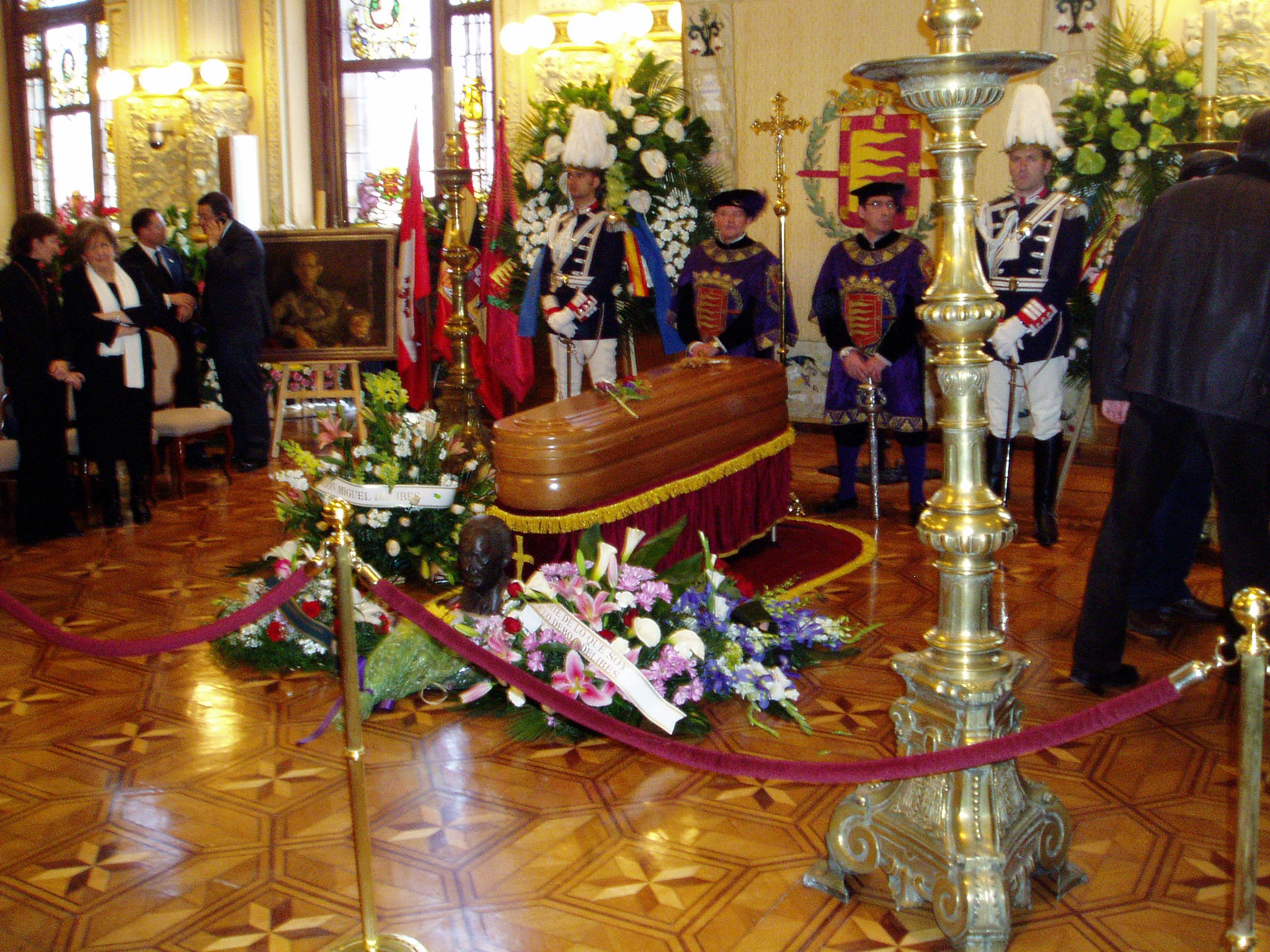
Miguel Delibes's casket at the funeral chapel installed in the reception hall of the Town Hall of Valladolid.

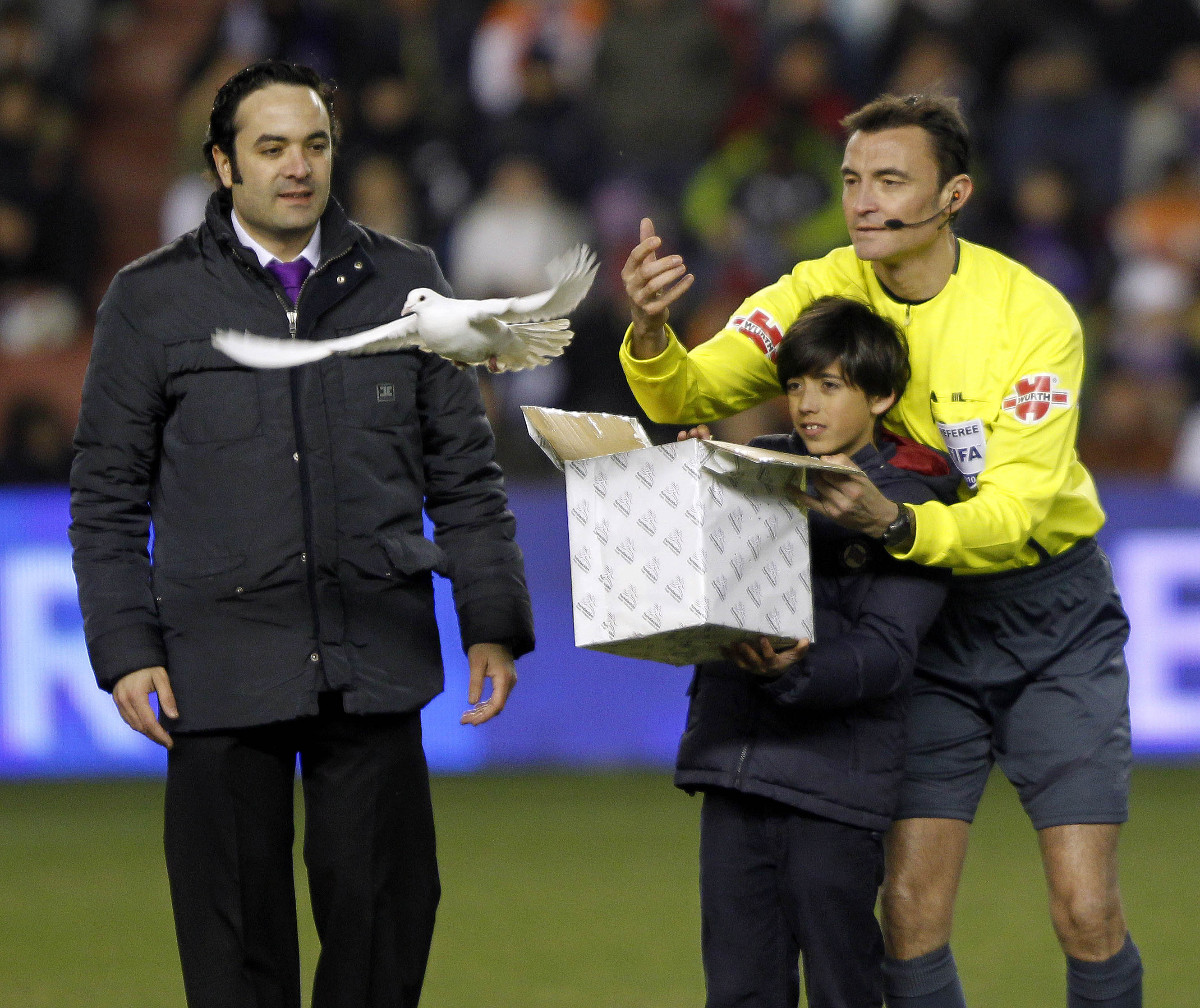
The events in memory of the writer in Valladolid during the weekend following his death. In the picture, Mejuto González, referee of the Spanish first league match between Real Valladolid and Real Madrid, accompanies the grandson of the writer at the release of a white dove as a tribute to Miguel Delibes.

During the early days of March 2010 his health worsened, and on 11 March, the writer was in critical condition, conscious but heavily sedated, and his family expected his death within hours. Miguel Delibes finally died at his home in Valladolid early in the morning of March 12, 2010, at the age of 89 years as a result of the colon cancer that was first diagnosed in 1998. His funeral chapel was installed that morning in the reception room of the Town Hall of Valladolid. It was visited by such personalities as Lola Herrera, Concha Velasco, the Deputy Prime Minister Maria Teresa Fernandez de la Vega, the President of Castile and León Juan Vicente Herrera and the Minister of Culture Ángeles González-Sinde, among others, as well as over 18,000 people.

His funeral was held in the morning of March 13 in the Cathedral of Valladolid. His remains were cremated and buried in the Pantheon of Illustrious Men of Valladolid among personalities such as José Zorrilla and Rosa Chacel. Valladolid City Council granted the privilege of moving the cremated remains of Ángeles, his wife, to that cemetery to bury with Delibes, thus honouring his long-expressed wish.

== Works ==
=== Novels ===
- La sombra del ciprés es alargada (1947)
- Aún es de día (1949)
- El camino (1950). The Path, trans. John and Brita Haycraft (John Day, 1961)
- Mi idolatrado hijo Sisí (1953)
- Diario de un cazador (1955)
- Diario de un emigrante (1958)
- La hoja roja (1959)
- Las ratas (1962). Smoke on the Ground, trans. Alfred Johnson (Doubleday, 1972)
- Cinco horas con Mario (1966). Five Hours with Mario, trans. Frances M. López-Morillas (Columbia University Press, 1988)
- Parábola del náufrago (1969). The Hedge, trans. Frances M. López-Morillas (Columbia University Press, 1983)
- El príncipe destronado (1973)
- Las guerras de nuestros antepasados (1975). The Wars of Our Ancestors, trans. Agnes Moncy (University of Georgia Press, 1992)
- El disputado voto del señor Cayo (1978)
- Los santos inocentes (1982). The Holy Innocents, trans. Peter Bush (Yale University Press, 2025)
- Cartas de amor de un sexagenario voluptuoso (1983). Love Letters from a Voluptuous Sexagenarian, trans. Teresa Claire Boucher (2017)
- El tesoro (1985)
- 377A, Madera de héroe (1987). The Stuff of Heroes, trans. Frances M. López-Morillas (Pantheon, 1990)
- Señora de rojo sobre fondo gris (1991)
- Diario de un jubilado (1996)
- El hereje (1998). The Heretic, trans. Alfred MacAdam (Overlook Press, 2006)

=== Short stories ===
- El loco (1953)
- La partida (1954)
- Siestas con viento sur (1957)
- Viejas historias de Castilla la Vieja (1964)
- La mortaja (1970)
- Tres pájaros de cuenta (1987)

=== Travel books ===
- Europa: parada y fonda (1963)
- USA y yo (1966)
- Por esos mundos : Sudamérica con escala en las Canarias (1970)
- La primavera de Praga (1970)
- Dos viajes en automóvil: Suecia y Países Bajos (1982)

=== Hunting books ===
- La caza de la perdiz roja (1963)
- El libro de la caza menor (1966)
- Con la escopeta al hombro (1970)
- La caza de España (1972)
- Aventuras, venturas y desventuras de un cazador a rabo (1978)
- Las perdices del domingo (1981)
- Mis amigas las truchas (1987)
- Dos días de caza (1988)
- El último coto (1992)

=== Essays and articles ===
- Castilla en mi obra (1972)
- Un año de mi vida (1975)
- Vivir al día (1975)
- SOS : el sentido del progreso desde mi obra (1976). Later republished as Un mundo que agoniza (1979)
- El otro fútbol (1982)
- La censura en los años cuarenta (1984)
- Castilla habla (1986)
- Castilla, lo castellano y los castellanos (1988)
- Mi querida bicicleta (1988)
- Mi vida al aire libre (1989)
- Pegar la hebra (1991)
- La vida sobre ruedas (1992)
- Un deporte de caballeros (1993)
- He dicho (1997)
- Delibes-Vergés. Correspondencia, 1948-1986 (2002)
- España 1939-1950: Muerte y resurrección de la novela (2004)
- La tierra herida: ¿qué mundo heredarán nuestros hijos? (2005). Written together with his son Miguel Delibes de Castro.

=== Other ===
- La barbería (1950)
- Envidia (1955)
- Alegrías de la Caza (1977)
- Nacho, el mago (1990)
- El conejo (1991)
- 25 años de escopeta y pluma (1995)
- Los niños (1995)
- Los estragos del tiempo (1999)
- Castilla como problema (2001)

== Adaptations ==
=== Television adaptations ===
- El camino, five episodes directed by Josefina Molina and broadcast on Spanish television in April 1978.
- La sombra del ciprés es alargada ("The Shadow of the Cypress is Long") is a 1990 Mexican-Spanish film directed by Luis Alcoriza.

=== Movie adaptations ===
The following novels of Miguel Delibes have been adapted for the cinema:

- El camino, directed by Ana Mariscal (1964), with Julia Caba Alba, Joaquín Roa, Mary Delgado and Maruchi Fresno
- Mi idolatrado hijo Sisí, adapted as Retrato de Familia, directed by Antonio Giménez-Rico (1976), with Antonio Ferrandis, Amparo Soler Leal, Mónica Randall and Miguel Bosé.
- El príncipe destronado, adapted as La guerra de papá, directed by Antonio Mercero (1977).
- The Holy Innocents, directed by Mario Camus (1984). Cannes prize for Francisco Rabal and Alfredo Landa.
- The Disputed Vote of Mr. Cayo, directed by Antonio Giménez-Rico (1986), with Francisco Rabal, Juan Luis Galiardo, Iñaki Miramón and Lydia Bosch.
- El tesoro, directed by Antonio Mercero (1988). One of the first movies with José Coronado.
- La sombra del ciprés es alargada, directed by Luis Alcoriza (1990).
- Las ratas, directed by Antonio Giménez-Rico (1996).
- Diario de un jubilado, adapted as Una pareja perfecta, directed by Francesc Betriu (1998), with José Sazatornil "Saza" and Antonio Resines.

== Awards ==
- Premio Nadal, for La sombra del ciprés es alargada (1947).
- Premio Nacional de Narrativa, for Diario de un cazador (1955).
- Premio Fastenrath of the Royal Spanish Academy, for Siestas con viento sur (1957).
- Prince of Asturias Award for Literature (1982).
- Premio de las Letras de Castilla y León (1984).
- Premio Ciudad de Barcelona, for Madera de héroe.
- Premio Nacional de las Letras Españolas (1991).
- Premio Miguel de Cervantes (1993).
- Premio Luka Brajnovic for Communication, awarded by the University of Navarra (1997).
- Premio Nacional de Narrativa, for El hereje (1999).

== Honours ==
- Awarded title of doctor honoris causa by the University of Valladolid (1983).
- Knight of Arts and Letters of the French Republic (1985).
- Named favorite son of Valladolid (1986).
- Awarded title of doctor honoris causa by the Complutense University of Madrid (June 1987).
- Awarded title of doctor honoris causa by the Saarland University (1990).
- Gold Medal of the Province of Valladolid (1993).
- Awarded title of doctor honoris causa by the Universidad de Alcalá de Henares (1996).
- Gold Medal of Merit in Labour (Kingdom of Spain, 30 April 1999).
- Medalla de Oro al Mérito Turístico of the Government of Cantabria (2006).
- Awarded title of doctor honoris causa by the University of Salamanca (2008).
- Medalla de Oro al Mérito Turístico of the Government of Cantabria (2009).
- Named adopted son of Molledo (2009).
- Medalla de Oro de Castilla y León by the President of the Junta of Castilla y León (2009).

== Bibliography ==
- García Domínguez, Ramón (1993). Miguel Delibes: la imagen escrita. Valladolid: 38.ª Semana Internacional de Cine. ISBN 84-87737-05-6.
- Dirección General del Libro y Bibliotecas (Ministerio de Cultura) (1994). Miguel Delibes: Premio Nacional de las Letras Españolas 1991. Madrid: Centro de las Letras Españolas. ISBN 84-8181-007-X.
- Alonso de los Ríos, César (1993). Conversaciones con Miguel Delibes. Ediciones Destino Áncora y Delfín. ISBN 84-233-2314-5.
- Reichardt, Mary (2010). Between Human and Divine: The Catholic Vision in Contemporary Literature. CUA Press. p. 86.
- Lapedota, Domenico Daniele. "Desajustes fraseológicos en la traducción al italiano de Señora de rojo sobre fondo gris de Miguel Delibes". Paremia vol. 30, 2020, pp. 39–50. Paremia PDF

Awards
Preceded by José Hierro	Recipient of the Prince of Asturias Award for Literature; 1982	Succeeded by Juan Rulfo
Preceded by Dulce María Loynaz	Recipient of the Miguel de Cervantes Prize; 1993	Succeeded by Mario Vargas Llosa
