= Ramón Salazar (director) =

Spanish film director and screenwriter

Ramón Salazar Hoogers (born 28 May 1973) is a Spanish film director and screenwriter. He was nominated for the 2003 Goya Award for Best New Director for the film Stones. He was born in Málaga.

== Selected filmography ==
Film
Year	Title	Role	Notes	Ref.
2002	Amnèsia	Screenwriter		
2002	Piedras (Stones)	Director, screenwriter		
2005	20 centímetros (20 Centimeters)	Director, screenwriter		
2010	3 metros sobre el cielo (Three Steps Above Heaven)	Screenwriter		
2013	10.000 noches en ninguna parte (10,000 Nights Nowhere)	Director, screenwriter		
2016	Tini: El gran cambio de Violetta (Tini: The Movie)	Screenwriter		
2018	La enfermedad del domingo (Sunday's Illness)	Director, screenwriter		
2018–19	Élite (Elite)	Director	TV series. Seasons 1–2	
2022	Red Rose	Director	TV series. Episodes 1 and 2	
