= List of Cuban films =

This is an incomplete list of films produced in Cuba in chronological order. For an A-Z list of films currently on Wikipedia see Category:Cuban films.

== 1890s ==
Title	Director	Cast	Genre	Notes
1897
Simulacro de incendio (Fire Drill)	Gabriel Veyre		Documentary	Short silent documentary film

== 1900s ==
Title	Director	Cast	Genre	Notes
1906
El parque de Palatino (The Palatino Park)	Enrique Díaz Quesada		Documentary	Short silent documentary film

== 1910s ==
Title	Director	Cast	Genre	Notes
1910
Criminal por obcecación (Criminal by Obcecation)	Enrique Díaz Quesada		Drama	Silent short film
Juan José (John Joseph)	Enrique Díaz Quesada		Drama	Silent short film
1913
Manuel García o el Rey de los campos de Cuba (Manuel García, King of Cuban Countryside)	Enrique Díaz Quesada	Gerardo Artecona, Evangelina Adams, Concepción Pou, María Izquierdo, Domingo Suárez, José Artecona, Andrés Bravo, Manuel Banderas	Drama	Silent film
1914
El capitán mambí (The Mambí Captain)	Enrique Díaz Quesada		Historic drama	
1915
La Manigua o La Mujer cubana (The "Manigua" or The Cuban Woman)	Enrique Díaz Quesada		Drama	
1916
El rescate de Sanguily (The Rescue of Sanguily)	Enrique Díaz Quesada		Bellic drama	
Duelo como en París (Duel Like in Paris)	Enrique Díaz Quesada		Comedy	
1917
La careta social (The Social Mask)	Enrique Díaz Quesada		Drama	
La hija del policía o En poder de los ñáñigos (The Policeman's Daughter or In the Hands of the "ñáñigos")	Enrique Díaz Quesada		Drama	
1918
Sangre y azúcar (Blood and Sugar)	Enrique Díaz Quesada		Drama	
1919
La brujería en acción (Witchcraft in action)	Enrique Díaz Quesada		Drama	

== 1920s ==
Title	Director	Cast	Genre	Notes
1920
Realidad (Reality)	Ramón Peón		Drama	Silent film
1922
Arroyito (Little Creek)	Enrique Díaz Quesada		Drama	Silent film
1929
El veneno de un beso (The poison of a kiss)	Ramón Peón	Miguel Santos	Drama	Silent film

== 1930s ==
Title	Director	Cast	Genre	Notes
1930
La virgen de la Caridad (The Virgin of Charity)	Ramón Peón	Miguel Santos, Gonzalo E. Piqui, M. del Valle and Olimpia Fernández	Drama	Silent film
1937
La Serpiente Roja (The red snake)	Ernesto Caparros	Paco Alfonso, Carlos Badias	Mystery	
1938
El Romance del Palmar (Romance in the Palm forest)	Ramón Peón	Carlos Badías, Lolita Berrio, Rita Montaner, María de los Ángeles Santana, Julito Díaz and Miguel Santos	Romantic drama	
Sucedió en La Habana (It Happened in Havana)	Ramón Peón	Rita Montaner	Romantic drama	
Tam Tam o El origen de la rumba	Ernesto Caparrós	Chela Castro	Short film	
1939
Una aventura peligrosa (A Dangerous Adventure)	Ramón Peón	Rosita Fornés	Romantic drama	
Mi tía de América (My Aunt from America)	Jaime Salvador	María de los Ángeles Santana	Comedy	
Estampas habaneras (Havana's Postals)	Jaime Salvador	María de los Ángeles Santana	Comedy	
Cancionero cubano (Cuban Songs)	Jaime Salvador	María de los Ángeles Santana	Musical	
La última melodía (The Last Melody)	Jaime Salvador		Musical	
Chaflán en La Habana (Chaflán in Havana)	Jaime Salvador		Comedy	

== 1940s ==
Title	Director	Cast	Genre	Notes
1940
Prófugos (Breakers)	Ernesto Caparrós	Ramiro Gómez Kemp, Julio Gallo, Blanquita Amaro	Drama	
Yo soy el héroe (I am the Hero)	Ernesto Caparrós		Drama	
1941
Romance musical (Musical Romance)	Ernesto Caparrós	Rosita Fornés	Romantic comedy, musical	
1942
Siboney	Juan Orol	María Antonieta Pons, Juan Orol, Chela Castro	Cine de rumberas, musical	
1946
Embrujo antillano (Caribbean Sorcery)	Juan Orol	María Antonieta Pons, Blanquita Amaro, Ramón Armengod, Kiko Mendive	Cine de rumberas, musical	
1947
El amor de mi bohío (The Love of my Hut)	Juan Orol	Yadira Jiménez, Juan Orol, José Pulido, Carlos Badías, Kiko Mendive	Cine de rumberas, musical	
La caperucita roja (The red hood)	Tomás Gutiérrez Alea		Short film	
El faquir (The fakir)	Tomás Gutiérrez Alea		Short film	
1949
María La O		Rita Montaner	Musical	
Escuela de modelos (School for Models)	José Fernández		Comedy	

== 1950s ==
Title	Director	Cast	Genre	Notes
1950
Rincón criollo (Country Corner)	Raúl Medina	Blanquita Amaro	Musical	
A Gypsy in Havana	Juan José Martínez Casado	Paquita de Ronda, Juan José Martínez Casado, Florencio Castelló	Musical comedy	Co-production with Mexico
1951
Una Cubana en España (A Cuban in Spain)	Luis Bayón Herrera	Blanquita Amaro	Musical comedy	Co-production with Argentina and Spain
La renegada	Ramón Peón	Rita Montaner	Drama	
Cuando las mujeres mandan (When women rule)	José M. González Prieto	Germán Valdés, Marcelo Chávez, Federico Piñero	Comedy, Musical	
En carne viva (In the Flesh)	Alberto Gout	Rosa Carmina, Rubén Rojo, Crox Alvarado	Cine de rumberas, musical	
1952
La única (The Only One)	Ramón Peón	Rita Montaner	Drama, musical	
Viajera (Wanderer)	Alfonso Patiño Gómez	Rosa Carmina, Fernando Fernández, Miguel Manzano, Georgina Barragán	Cine de rumberas, musical	
1953
Mission to the North of Seoul	Juan José Martínez Casado	Rafael Bertrand, Emilita Dago, Paquita de Ronda	War	
Bella the Savage	Raúl Medina and Roberto Rey	Blanquita Amaro	Musical comedy	
Ángeles de la calle (Angels of the Street)	Agustín P. Delgado	Andrea Palma	Drama	
Piel canela (Cinnamon Skin)	Juan José Ortega	Rosita Fornés	Romance	
Tin Tan en La Habana (Tin Tan in Havana)	Gilberto Martínez	Germán Valdés, Rosita Fornés	Comedy, musical	
1954
La rosa blanca (The white rose)	Emilio Fernández, Íñigo de Martino	Roberto Cañedo, Gina Cabrera, Alicia Caro	Drama, Biopic	
Me gustan todas (I like them all!)	Juan José Ortega	Rosita Fornés	Comedy	
Sandra, la mujer de fuego (Sandra, the Fire Woman)	Juan Orol	Rosa Carmina, Arturo Martínez, César del Campo, Manuel Arvide	Cine de rumberas, musical	
Mulata	Gilberto Martínez Solares	Ninón Sevilla, Pedro Armendáriz, René Cardona	Cine de rumberas, musical	
1955
El Mégano	Julio García Espinosa		Documentary	
Tres bárbaros en un jeep (Three barbarians in a jeep)	Manuel de la Pedrosa	Gabriel Aragón, Emilio Aragón, Fofó	Comedy	
1956
No me olvides nunca (Don't forget me)	Juan José Ortega	Rosita Fornés	Romantic drama	
1957
Yambaó	Alfredo B. Cervenna	Ninón Sevilla, Olga Guillot, Xiomara Alfaro	Cine de rumberas, musical	
1958
Con el deseo en los dedos (Desire between fingers)	Mario Barral	Minín Bujones, Jorge Felix and Enrique Santiesteban	Romantic drama	
1959
Allá va eso (Here We Go)			Comedy	
Aquí están los Villalobos o El regreso de los Villalobos			Drama	
El beso del adiós (The Kiss of Goodbye)			Romantic drama	
La vida comienza ahora (Life Begins Now)			Drama	
La vuelta a Cuba en 80 minutos (Around Cuba in 80 Minutes)	Manuel Samaniego	Tito Hernández, Osvaldo Calvo, Manolo Fernández, Pedro Vargas, Olga Lidia Rodríguez, Raquel Revuelta, Enrique Santiesteban, Enrique Almirante, Luis Alberto Ramírez	Comedy	
Los tres Villalobos o La justicia de los Villalobos			Drama	
Mares de pasión (Seas of Passion)			Romantic drama	
Soy un bicho (I'm a Bug)			Comedy	
Surcos de libertad (Fields of Liberty)			Drama	
Esta tierra nuestra (This land of ours)		Tomás Gutiérrez Alea, Julio García Espinosa	Documentary	
Cuba baila (Cuba is Dancing)	Julio García Espinosa		Musical	

== 1960s ==
Title	Director	Cast	Genre	Notes
1960
¡Arriba el campesino! (Up, peasants!)	Mario Gallo		Documentary	Short documentary
El maná (The mana)	Jesús de Armas		Animation	First cartoon produced by ICAIC
Carnaval (Carnival)	Fausto Canel, Joe Massot		Documentary	
Asamblea general (General assembly)	Tomás Gutiérrez Alea		Documentary	
Gente en la playa (People in the beach)	Néstor Almendros		Documentary	
Al compás de Cuba (To the compass of Cuba)	Mario Gallo		Documentary	
Historias de la revolución (Stories of the revolution)	Tomás Gutiérrez Alea		Historic drama, documentary	
1961
Santo vs. the Evil Brain	Joselito Rodríguez	Joaquín Cordero, Norma Suárez, Enrique Zambrano and Rodolfo Guzmán Huerta	Horror, action	
Realengo 18	Oscar Torres, Eduardo Manet		Drama	
P.M. (Pasado Meridiano)	Alberto Cabrera Infante, Orlando Jiménez Leal		Documentary	
¡Muerte al invasor! (Death to invaders!)	Tomás Gutiérrez Alea, Santiago Álvarez		Documentary	
El Bautizo (The Christening)	Roberto Fandiño	Julito Martinez, Eloisa Alvarez Guedes, Enrique Almirante, Dulce Velazco, Idalberto Delgado, Manela Bustamente, Tete Blanco, Alden Knight, Salvador Wood and Agustin Campos		
1962
Las doce sillas (Twelve Chairs)	Tomás Gutiérrez Alea	Enrique Santiesteban and Reynaldo Miravalles	Comedy	
El joven rebelde (The young rebel)	Julio García Espinosa,	Ángel Espasande, Blas Mora, Reynaldo Miravalles, Wember Bros	Historic drama	
Cuba 58	José Miguel García Ascot and Jorge Fraga	Sergio Peña, Luis Alberto Ramírez, Ricardo Lima, Jorge Martínez, Luis Rielo, Pedro Pablo Astorga, Rafael Sosa, René de la Cruz, Sergio Corrieri, José Antonio Rodríguez, Adolfo Llauradó	Drama	
1963
El Otro Cristóbal (The Other Christopher)	Armand Gatti		Drama	
Melodrama	Rolando Diaz	Javier Avila, Carlos Cruz, Veronica Lopez		
Giselle	Enrique Pineda Barnet	Alicia Alonso, Azary Plisetski, Fernando Alonso, José Parés, Mirta Plá, Loipa Araújo, Josefina Méndez	Drama	
Crónica cubana (Cuban Chronicle)	Ugo Ulive	Carmen Delgado, Miguel Benavides, Pedro Álvarez, Juan Cañas, Adela Escartín, Violeta Jiménez	Drama	
1964
Soy Cuba (I am Cuba)	Mikhail Kalatozov	Sergio Corrieri and Salvador Wood	Drama, anthology, social realism	
La decisión (The Decision)	José Massip	Daisy Granados, Mario Limonta and Miguel Benavides	Romantic drama, social realism	
Cumbite	Tomás Gutiérrez Alea	Teté Vergara, Lorenzo Louiz, Marta Evans, Luis Valera, Rafael Sosa	Drama	
Tránsito (Transit)	Eduardo Manet	José Antonio Rodríguez, Carlos Ruiz de la Tejera, Ofelia González, Omar Valdés, Asenneh Rodríguez, René de la Cruz	Drama	
Un poco más de luz (A Bit More of Light)			Drama	
En días como estos	Jorge Fraga	Mequi Herrera, Rebeca Morales, Carmen Delgado, Magali Boix, Emérita Gerardo, Marilys Ríos, Mirta Medina, Diana Rosa Suárez	Drama	
El encuentro (The Encounter)			Drama	
1965
La salación (Damnation)	Manuel Octavio Gómez	Blanca Contreras, Lorenzo López, Josefina Henríquez, Dinorah Anreus, Marta Farré, Ricardo Barner, Idalia Anreus	Drama	
El robo (The Robbery)	Jorge Fraga	Consuelo Vidal, José Manuel Castiñeiras, Magali Boix, Carlos Bermúdez, Isaura Mendoza, José Antonio Rodríguez, Miguel Benavides	Drama	
Desarraigo	Fausto Canel	Sergio Corrieri, Yolanda Farr, Reynaldo Miravalles, Julito Martínez, Helmo Hernández, Fernando Bermúdez, Sofía Iduate, Raúl Eguren, Roberto Lazo, José Taín	Drama	
1966
Muerte de un burócrata (Death of a Bureaucrat)	Tomás Gutiérrez Alea	Salvador Wood and Silvia Planas	Black comedy	
Manuela	Humberto Solás	Adela Legrá and Adolfo Llauradó	Drama	
Papeles son papeles (Papers are papers)	Fausto Canel	Reynaldo Miravalles, Sergio Corrieri, Lilliam Llerena, Manuel Pereiro, René de la Cruz	Drama	
1967
Aventuras de Juan Quinquin (The adventures of Juan Quinquin)	Julio García Espinosa	Julio Martínez, Edwin Fernández, Adelaida Raymat, Enrique Santiesteban, Agustín Campos, Manuel Pereiro, Anneris Clech and Mayda Limonta	Comedy	
Por Primera Vez (For the First Time)	Octavio Cortázar		Documentary	
Tulipa	Manuel Octavio Gómez	Idalia Anreus, Daisy Granados, Omar Valdés, Alejandro Lugo, José Antonio Rodríguez	Drama	
David	Enrique Pineda Barnet			
El huésped	Eduardo Manet	Raquel Revuelta, Enrique Almirante, Amelita Pita	Romantic drama	
1968
Memorias del subdesarrollo (Memories of Underdevelopment)	Tomás Gutiérrez Alea	Sergio Corrieri, Daysi Granados, Eslinda Núñez and Omar Valdés	Drama	
Lucía	Humberto Solás	Raquel Revuelta, Eslinda Núñez and Adela Legrá	Historic drama, anthology	
La odisea del General José (The Odyssey of General Joseph)	Jorge Fraga	Miguel Benavides, Georgina Almanza, René de la Cruz, José Antonio Rodríguez, Idalia Anreus	Historic drama	
La ausencia (The absence)	Alberto Roldán	Eduardo Moure, Miguel Navarro, Sergio Corrieri	Drama	
1969
La primera carga al machete (The First Machete Charge)	Manuel Octavio Gómez	José Antonio Rodríguez, Adolfo Llauradó, Idalia Anreus, Omar Valdés, Eduardo Moure, Raúl Pomares, Pablo Milanés	Bellic drama, docudrama	

== 1970s ==
Title	Director	Cast	Genre	Notes
1971
Una pelea cubana contra los demonios (Cuban Struggle Against Demons)	Tomás Gutiérrez Alea	José Antonio Rodríguez, Raúl Pomares, Reynaldo Miravalles, Verónica Lynn	Historic drama	
Los días del agua (Days of Water)	Manuel Octavio Gómez	Idalia Anreus, Raúl Pomares, Adolfo Llauradó, Mario Balmaseda	Historic drama	
Páginas del diario de José Martí (Pages of José Martí's Diary)	José Massip	Adolfo Llauradó, Raúl Pomares, Daisy Granados	Historic drama	
1972
Un día de noviembre (A Day in November)	Humberto Solás	Gildo Torres, Raquel Revuelta, Eslinda Núñez, Silvia Planas, Miguel Benavides, Omar Valdés, Rogelio Blaín	Drama, social realism	
1973
El hombre de Maisinicú (The man from Maisinicú)	Manuel Pérez Paredes	Sergio Corrieri, Reynaldo Miravalles and Adolfo Llauradó	Historic drama, social realism	
Ustedes tienen la palabra (You have the Word)	Manuel Octavio Gómez	Luis Alberto Ramírez, Salvador Wood, Omar Valdés, Idalia Anreus, Miguel Benavides, Rogelio Blaín and Mario Balmaseda	Social realism	
El extraño caso de Rachel K (The Strange Case of Rachel K)	Oscar Valdés	Carlos Gilí, Mario Balmaseda, Isabel Moreno	Film noir	
1975
El otro Francisco (The Other Francisco)	Sergio Giral		Drama	
Mella	Enrique Pineda Barnet	Sergio Corrieri	Historic drama, biopic	
1976
Cantata de Chile (Song of Chile)	Humberto Solás	Nelson Villagra	Historic drama	
La última cena (Last Supper)	Tomás Gutiérrez Alea	Nelson Villagra	Historic drama	
Patty Candela	Julio García Espinosa		Historic drama	
La tierra y el cielo (Earth and Heaven)	Manuel Octavio Gómez		Drama	
1977
De Cierta Manera (In a certain way)	Sara Gómez	Mario Balmaseda, Mario Limonta	Social realism, documentary	
Rancheador (Ranger)	Sergio Giral		Historic drama	
El brigadista (The teacher)	Octavio Cortázar	Patricio Wood and Salvador Wood	Historic drama	
Rio Negro (Black river)	Manuel Pérez Paredes	Sergio Corrieri, Nelson Villagra, Alejandro Lugo and Mario Balmaseda		
1978
El recurso del método (The Recourse to the Method)	Miguel Littin	Nelson Villagra	Drama	
Una mujer, un hombre, una ciudad (A woman, a ma, a city)	Manuel Octavio Gómez	Idalia Anreus, Mario Balmaseda, Raúl Pomares, Omar Valdés, Alden Knight	Romantic drama	
1979
Los sobrevivientes (The survivors)	Tomás Gutiérrez Alea	Enrique Santiesteban, Reynaldo Miravalles and German Pinelli	Black comedy	
Aquella larga noche (That Long Night)	Enrique Pineda Barnet	Raquel Revuelta	Historic drama, biopic	
Retrato de Teresa (Portrait of Theresa)	Pastor Vega	Daysi Granados and Adolfo Llauradó	Social realism	
No hay sábado sin sol (There's no Saturday Without Sun)	Manuel Herrera Reyes	Eslinda Núñez, Idalia Anreus		
Elpidio Valdés	Juan Padrón		Animation	First animation film in Cuba

== 1980s ==
Title	Director	Cast	Genre	Notes
1980
Maluala	Sergio Giral			
Son... o no son (They are... aren't they?)	Julio García Espinosa	Daisy Granados	Documentary	
1981
Guardafronteras (Coastguards)	Octavio Cortázar	Tito Junco, Patricio Wood, Javier González, Salvador Blanco, Maribel Rodríguez, Alberto Pujol, Idalia Anreus and Alejandro Lugo	Historic drama	
Techo de Vidrio (Glassroof)	Sergio Giral	Susana Pérez	Social realism	
Polvo rojo (Red Dust)	Jesús Díaz	Adolfo Llauradó, René de la Cruz, José Antonio Rodríguez, Cristina Obín, Tito Junco, Luis Alberto Ramírez	Drama, social realism	
Leyenda (Legend)				
1982
Cecilia	Humberto Solas	Daisy Granados, Imanol Arias, Raquel Revuelta, Miguel Benavides, Eslinda Núñez, Nelson Villagra, Gerardo Riverón, Alejandro Lugo, Alfredo Mayo, Enrique Almirante, Mayda Limonta, Angel Toraño, Hilda Oates	Romantic drama	
Amada (Beloved)	Humberto Solás	Eslinda Nuñez, César Évora, Silvia Planas, Andrés Hernández, Oncida Hernández, Gerardo Riveron	Romantic drama	
Los pájaros tirándole a la escopeta (Birds Shooting the Shotgun)	Rolando Díaz	Consuelo Vidal, Reynaldo Miravalles, Alberto Pujol, Beatriz Valdés	Romantic comedy	
Una casa colonial (A Colonial House)	Miguel Torres	María de los Ángeles Santana, Alberto Pujol,	Comedy	
1983
Matojo va a la playa			Animation	
Hasta cierto punto (Up to a certain point)	Tomás Gutiérrez Alea	Óscar Álvarez, Mirta Ibarra and Omar Valdés	Social realism	
Los refugiados de la Cueva del Muerto (Refugees of Deadman's Cave)	Santiago Álvares	René de la Cruz (hijo), Alberto Pujol and Raúl Pomares	Historic drama	
En tiempo de amar (In Time of Loving)	Enrique Pineda Barnet	Roberto Bertrand, Lilian Rentería and Orlando Casín	Romantic drama	
El Señor Presidente (Mr. President)	Manuel Octavio Gómez	Michel Auclair, Bruno Garcín, Reynaldo Miravalles, Florence Jaugey, Idalia Anreus	Drama	
Elpidio Valdés contra dólar y cañón (Elpidio Valdés Against Dollards and Cannons)	Juan Padrón		Animation	Second animation film in Cuba
1984
Se permuta (House for swap)	Juan Carlos Tabío	Rosita Fornés, Isabel Santos and Mario Balmaseda	Comedy	
Patakín	Manuel Octavio Gómez	Miguel Benavides, Asenneh Rodríguez and Enrique Arredondo	Musical	
Caturla		César Évora	Biopic	
Habanera	Pastor Vega	César Évora, Daisy Granados	Drama	
La segunda hora de Esteban Zayas (The second time of Esteban Zayas)	Manuel Pérez Paredes	Mario Balmaseda, Diana Rosa Suárez, Salvador Wood, Susana Pérez, Nelson Villagra, Enrique Molina, Fidel Pérez Michel, Orlando Casín	Drama	
1985
Lejania (Far away)	Jesús Díaz	Verónica Lynn, Jorge Trinchet, Isabel Santos, Beatriz Valdés, Mónica Guffanti, Mauricio Rentería	Drama	
De tal Pedro tal astilla	Luis Felipe Bernaza	Reynaldo Miravalles, Ana Viña and Nancy Gonzáles		
Vampiros en La Habana (Vampires in Havana!)	Juan Padrón		Animation	
El bohío (The hut)	Mario Rivas			
Jíbaro (Wild Dogs)	Daniel Díaz Torres			
Como la vida misma (Life Itself)	Víctor Casaus	Fernando Hechavarría, Beatríz Valdés, Pedro Rentería, Sergio Corrieri, Flora Lauten	Drama	
Un corazón sobre la tierra (Heart on the Land)	Constante Diego	Reynaldo Miravalles, Nelson Villagra, Annia Linares, Tito Junco, Argelio Sosa, René de la Cruz, Luis Alberto García	Drama	
En tres y dos	Rolando Díaz	Reynaldo Miravalles, Nelson Villagra, Annia Linares, Tito Junco, Argelio Sosa, René de la Cruz, Luis Alberto García	Drama	
Una novia para David (A Girlfriend for David)	Orlando Rojas	María Isabel Díaz, Jorge Luis Álvarez, Francisco Gattorno, Edith Massola, Thais Valdés	Romantic comedy	
1986
Un hombre de éxito (A man of success)	Humberto Solas	Daisy Granados, Cesar Evora, Beatriz Valdes, Raquel Revuelta, Jorge Trinchet, Carlos Cruz, Jorge Ali	Drama	
Plácido	Sergio Giral	Jorge Villazón	Biopic	
Baraguá	José Massip	Mario Balmaseda, José Antonio Rodríguez, Nelson Villagra, Sergio Corrieri, Rogelio Meneses, René de la Cruz	Historic drama, bellic film	
Vals en la Habana Vieja (Old Havana Waltz)	Luis Felipe Bernaza	Reynaldo Miravalles, Orlando Casín, Ana Viña, Tahimí Alvariño, Jorge Luis García, Mauricio Márquez, Corina Mestre, Leonor Zamora		
Otra mujer (Another Woman)	Daniel Díaz Torres	Mirta Ibarra, Jorge Villazón, Susana Pérez, Raúl Pomares, Alejandro Lugo and Dagoberto Gaínza	Drama	
Dolly Back	Juan Carlos Tabío		Short film	
1987
Capablanca	Manuel Herrera Reyes	César Évora, Beatriz Valdés	Biopic	
Gallego (Galician)	Manuel Octavio Gómez	Sancho Gracia, Manuel Galiana, Jorge Sanz, Linda Mirabal, Francisco Rabal	Drama	
Amor en campo minado (Love in a Minefield)	Pastor Vega	Daisy Granados	Romantic drama	
Clandestinos (Clandestines)	Fernando Pérez	Luis Alberto García, Isabel Santos and Amado del Pino	Historic drama	
Hoy como ayer (Today like yesterday)	Constante Diego	Rosita Fornés, Beatriz Valdés	Musical	
1988
Plaff (Splat! or Too afraid of life)	Juan Carlos Tabío	Daisy Granados, Luis Alberto García, Thais Valdés and Raúl Pomares	Comedy	
Un señor muy viejo con unas alas enormes (A Very Old Mister With Enormous Wings)	Fernando Birri	Fernando Birri, Daisy Granados, Luis Alberto Ramírez, Silvia Planas and Adolfo Llauradó		
Cartas del parque (Letters from the Park)	Tomás Gutiérrez Alea	Víctor Laplace, Ivonne López, Miguel Paneke, Mirtha Ibarra, Adolfo Llauradó, Elio Mesa	Romantic drama	
En el aire (On Air)	Pastor Vega			
1989
La bella del Alhambra (The beauty of the Alhambra)	Enrique Pineda Barnet	Beatriz Valdéz, Omar Valdéz and Verónica Lynn	Musical	
María Antonia	Sergio Giral	Alina Rodríguez, Alexis Valdés	Drama	
Papeles secundarios (Secondary roles)	Orlando Rojas	Rosita Fornés, Luisa Pérez Nieto, Ernesto Tapia	Romantic drama	
Bajo presión (Under Pressure)	Víctor Casaus	René de la Cruz, Isabel Moreno, José Antonio Rodríguez, Broselianda Hernández, Orlando Casín, Alberto Pujol	Drama	
Venir al mundo (Coming to the World)	Miguel Torres	Mario Balmaseda, Luisa María Jiménez, Susana Pérez, Thaimí Alvariño, Alberto Pujol, Miguel Navarro, Luisa María Jiménez	Drama	
La vida en rosa (La Vie en Rose)	Rolando Díaz			
La inútil muerte de mi socio Manolo (The Unuseful Death of My Buddy Manolo)	Julio García Espinosa	Mario Balmaseda	Drama	

== 1990s ==
Title	Director	Cast	Genre	Notes
1990
Mujer transparente (Transparent Woman)	Héctor Veitía, Mayra Segura, Mayra Vilasís, Mario Crespo, Ana Rodríguez	Isabel Moreno, Manuel Porto, Vivian Agramonte, Orlando Fundicheli, Verónica Lynn, César Évora, Oriol de la Torre, Mirtha Ibarra, Jorge Martínez, Rolando Núñez, Leonor Arocha, Leonardo Armas, Selma Soreghi and Leonor Arocha	Anthology	
Hello Hemingway	Fernando Pérez	Laura de la Uz, Raúl Paz, José Antonio Rodríguez, Martha del Río, Herminia Sánchez	Comedy	
Caravana	Rogelio París	Patricio Wood, Manuel Porto, Omar Moynello, Samuel Claxton	Bellic drama	
Oscuros Rinocerontes Enjaulados (Dark caged rhinos)	Juan Carlos Cremata	Paula Alí	Short film	
1991
Alicia en el pueblo de Maravillas (Alice in Wonder Town)	Daniel Díaz Torres	Thais Valdés, Reynaldo Miravalles, Alberto Pujol, Raúl Pomares, Alina Rodríguez	Comedy	
Sueño tropical (Tropical Dream)	Miguel Torres	Daisy Granados		
Mascaró, el cazador americano (Mascareau, the American hunter)	Constante Diego	Reynaldo Miravalles, Omar Moynello, Carlos Cruz, René de la Cruz, Luis Alberto García, Raúl Pomares, Enrique Almirante, Alejandro Lugo	Drama	
1992
Adorables mentiras (Adorable lies)	Gerardo Chijona	Luis Alberto García, Isabel Santos, Mirtha Ibarra and Thais Valdés	Romantic comedy	
La última rumba de Papá Montero	Octavio Cortázar		Documentary	
El Siglo de las Luces (The Enlightenment Age)	Humberto Solás	Jacqueline Arenal, Alexis Valdés	Historic drama	
Vidas paralelas (Parallel Lives)	Pastor Vega	Daisy Granados		
La crin de Venus (The Hair of Venus)	Diego Rodríguez Arché	Carlos Cruz, Alberto Pujol	Drama	
8-A (Ochoa)	Orlando Jiménez-Leal		Documentary	
1993
Fresa y Chocolate (Strawberry and chocolate)	Tomás Gutiérrez Alea and Juan Carlos Tabío	Jorge Perugorría, Vladimir Cruz and Mirta Ibarra	Drama/comedy	
Culpa (Guilt)	Jorge Molina			
Banderas, the Tyrant	José Luis García Sánchez	Gian Maria Volonté	Drama	
El plano (The Plain)	Julio García Espinosa			
1994
El elefante y la bicicleta (The elephant and the bicycle)	Juan Carlos Tabío	Luis Alberto García, Lillian Vega, Raúl Pomaresand, Martha Farré, Daisy Granados, Adolfo Llauradó, Patricio Wood, Osvaldo Doimeadiós, Paula Alí and Gladys Zurbano		
Madagascar	Fernando Pérez	Laura de la Uz	Drama	
Quiéreme y verás (Love Me and You'll See)	Daniel Díaz Torres			
Reina y Rey (Queen and King)	Julio García Espinosa	Consuelo Vidal, Coralia Veloz	Drama/comedy	
Derecho de asilo (Political Asylum)	Octavio Cortázar	Jorge Perugorría, Luisa Pérez Nieto, Carlos Padrón, Manuel Porto, Enrique Molina, Jorge Cao	Drama	
1995
Guantanemera	Tomás Gutiérrez Alea and Juan Carlos Tabío	Mirta Ibarra, Jorge Perugorría	Romantic comedy	
La ola (The Wave)	Enrique Álvarez			
1996
Pon tu pensamiento en mí (Think of Me)	Arturo Sotto Díaz			
Historias clandestinas de La Habana (Clandestine Stories of Havana)	Diego Musik	Laura de la Uz		
1997
Eyes of the Rainbow	Gloria Rolando		Documentary	
Tropicanita (Little Tropicana)	Daniel Díaz Torres		Comedy	
Zafiros, locura azul (Saphires, blue madness)	Manuel Herrera Reyes	Luis Alberto García, Bárbaro Marín, Néstor Jiménez, Sirio Soto, Jorge Treto, Mario Balmaseda	Musical, biopic	
Amor vertical (Vertical love)	Arturo Sotto Díaz	Jorge Perugorría, Sílvia Águila, Susana Pérez	Romantic comedy	
Mambí	Santiago and Teodoro Ríos	Luis Alberto García, Eslinda Núñez, Aramís Delgado	Bellic drama	
1998
La Vida es Silbar (Life is a whistle)	Fernando Pérez	Luis Alberto García, Coralia Veloz, Rolando Brito and Isabel Santos		
Angelito mío (Little Angel of Mine)	Enrique Pineda Barnet			
Cuarteto de La Habana (Havana's Quartet)	Fernando Colombo	Daisy Granados, Laura Ramos, Mirtha Ibarra	Comedy	
1999
Buena Vista Social Club	Wim Wenders	Luis Barzaga, Joachim Cooder, Ry Cooder	Documentary	
Son sabrosón: antesala de la salsa	Hugo Barroso		Documentary	
Los Zapaticos me Aprietan (The shoes are tie)	Humberto Padrón			
Las profecías de Amanda (The Prophecies of Amanda)	Pastor Vega	Daisy Granados, Herón Vega, Laura Ramos, Consuelo Vidal	Comedy	
Un paraíso bajo las estrellas (A Paradise under the Stars)	Gerardo Chijona	Thais Valdés, Vladimir Cruz, Daisy Granados, Enrique Molina, Jacqueline Arenal	Comedy	
Operación Fangio (Operation Fangio)	Alberto Lecchi	Darío Grandinetti, Laura Ramos, Fernando Guillén Gallego, Arturo Maly, Gustavo Salmerón	Historic drama	

== 2000s ==
Title	Director	Cast	Genre	Notes
2000
Hacerse el Sueco (Becoming Swedish)	Daniel Díaz Torres	Enrique Molina, Coralia Veloz, Raúl Pomares and Ketty de la Iglesia	Comedy	
Lista de Espera (Waiting List)	Juan Carlos Tabío	Vladimir Cruz, Tahimí Alvariño and Jorge Perugorría	Romantic comedy	
Clase Z "Tropical"	Miguel Coyula			
Estorvo (Turbulence)	Ruy Guerra	Jorge Perugorría	Drama	Co-production with Brazil and Portugal
Salsa		Alexis Valdés, Aurora Basnuevo	Comedy	
2001
Habaneceres	Luis Leonel León		Documentary	
Video de familia	Humberto Padrón	Enrique Molina		
Nada (Nothing)	Juan Carlos Cremata	Thais Valdés, Nassiry Lugo, Daisy Granados and Paula Alí	Drama	
Miel para Oshun (Honey for Oshun)	Humberto Solas	Jorge Perrugoria, Isabel Santos, Mario Limonta and Adela Legrá	Drama	
Las noches de Constantinopla (Nights of Constantinople)	Orlando Rojas	Verónica Lynn, María Isabel Díaz, Vladimir Villar, Jorge Alí, Hilario Peña, Rubén Breña and Rosita Fornés	Romantic drama	
Al atardecer (At Noon)	Tomás Piard	Rosita Fornés	Drama	
Miradas (Stares)	Enrique Álvarez		Drama	
2002
Todo por ella (All for her)	Pavel Giroud			
Yank Tanks	David C. Schendel		Documentary	The first Cuban/American film co-production since 1958
Santa Camila de la Habana Vieja (Saint Camila of Old Havana)		Luisa María Jiménez, Luis Alberto García, Paula Alí, Beatriz Viñas	Drama	
Doble Juego (Double Game)	Rudy Mora	Mónica Alonso, Corina Mestre, Raúl Lora, Alejandro Socorro	Drama	
El sueño y un día (The Dream and A Day)	Tomás Piard	Fernando Hechavarría, Maribel Reyes, Katia Caso, Ernesto Santana, Eslinda Núñez, Jorge Alí, Patricio Wood	Drama	
2003
Suite Habana (Havana Suite)	Fernando Pérez	Documentary		
Entre ciclones (Between Hurricanes)	Enrique Colina	Mario Balmaseda, Mijail Mulkay, Tito Junco, Raúl Pomares, Renny Arozarena, Alexis Díaz de Villegas	Comedy	
Aunque estés lejos (Even If You're Far Away)	Juan Carlos Tabío	Mirtha Ibarra, Antonio Valero, Barbaro Marín, Susana Pérez, Mijaíl Mulkay, Laura Ramos	Drama	
Cucarachas Rojas (Red Cockroaches)	Miguel Coyula	Adam Plotch, Talia Rubel and Jeff Pucillo	Short film	
La casa por la ventana (The house through the window)	Pavel Giroud			
El sexo lo cambia todo (Sex Changes Everything)	Luis Carlos Lacerda	Jorge Sanz, Laura Ramos, Vladimir Cruz, María Galiana, Paula Burlamaqui, Maitê Proença	Comedy	
Roble de olor (Smelly Oak)	Rigoberto López	Jorge Perugorría, Leonardo Benítez	Romantic drama	
Más vampiros en La Habana (More Vampires in Havana!)	Juan Padrón		Animation	
Paraíso (Paradise)	Alina Teodorescu		Documentary	Co-production with Germany
2004
Silk Screen	Pavel Giroud			
Gran Residencial Caribe (Grand Residential Caribbean)		Broselianda Hernández, Patricio Wood, Yori Gómez	Comedy	
Tres veces dos (Three times two)	Pavel Giroud, Léster Hamlet and Estéban Insausti		Anthology	
Perfecto amor equivocado (Perfectly Mistaken Love)	Gerardo Chijona	Luis Alberto García, Susana Pérez, Sheila Roche and Mijaíl Mulkay	Romantic comedy	
2005
Hormigas en la boca (Ants in the Mouth)	Mariano Barroso	Jorge Perugorría, Ariadna Gil, Eduard Fernández and José Luis Gómez	Thriller	
Viva Cuba	Juan Carlos Cremata	Luisa Maria Jiménez and Alberto Pujol	Coming-of-age	
Habana Blues	Benito Zambrano	Alberto Yoel, Roberto Sanmartín and Yailene Sierra	Musical	
Barrio Cuba (Cuba Neighborhood)	Humberto Solás	Luisa María Jiménez, Jorge Perugorría, Isabel Santos, Mario Limonta, Adela Legrá, Rafael Lahera	Drama	
La memoria de los árboles (Memory of the Trees)	Tomás Piard		Drama	
Frank Emilio, Amor y Piano (Love and piano)	Pavel Giroud		Documentary	
Esther Borja: Rapsodia de Cuba (Rhapsody of Cuba)	Pavel Giroud		Documentary	
Espectros (Spectres)	Tomás Piard		Drama	
Un rey en la Habana (A king in Havana)	Alexis Valdes	Alexis Valdes, Pedro Rentería, Maria Isabel Diaz	Comedy	
90 millas (90 miles)	Francisco Rodríguez	Alexis Valdés, Daisy Granados, Enrique Molina	Comedy/drama	
Bailando cha cha cha (Dancing Cha Cha)	Manuel Herrera Reyes	Eslinda Níñez	Musical	
Mi Caballero de París (My Gentleman of Paris)	Consuelo Ramírez	Eslinda Níñez	Drama, biopic	
Santa Cecilia	Tomás Piard	Osvaldo Doimeadiós	Drama	
Frutas en el café	Humberto Padrón		Drama	
Bye Bye Havana	J. Michael Seyfert		Documentary	
2006
El Benny	Jorge Luis Sánchez	Renny Arozarena and Enrique Molina	Biopic	
La Edad de la peseta (The silly age)	Pavel Giroud	Mercedes Sampietro, Esther Cardozo, Iván Carreira, José Ángel Egido, Carla Paneca	Coming-of-age	
Una rosa de Francia (Virgin Rose)	Manuel Gutiérrez Aragón	Jorge Perugorría, Álex González, Broselianda Hernández and Ana de Armas	Romance, adventure	Co-production with Spain
Peloteros (Ballplayers)	Coco Castillo		Sports, action, comedy-drama	Co-production with Peru
Car Havana	Pavel Giroud			
La pared (The Wall)	Alejandro Gil	Héctor Noas, Aramís Delgado, Amarilys Núñez, Daisy Quintana, Isabel Santos, Eslinda Núñez	Drama	
Páginas del diario de Mauricio (Pages of Maurice's Diary)	Manuel Pérez Paredes	Rolando Brito, Blanca Rosa Blanco, Raúl Pomares, Larisa Vega, Solange Ramón	Drama	
Mañana (Tomorrow)	Alejandro Moya "Iskánder"	Rafael Ernesto Hernández, Violeta Rodríguez, Hugo Reyes, Adria Santana, Enrique Molina	Drama	
Freddie	Tomás Piard		Drama	
Viaje de un largo día hacia la noche (Long Day's Journey into Night)	Tomás Piard	Aramís Delgado, Eslinda Núñez	Drama	
2007
Madrigal	Fernando Pérez	Ana de Armas, Carlos Enrique Almirante, Luis Alberto García	Drama	
La vida según Ofelia (Life According to Ophelia)	Rolando Díaz	Ana de Armas, Carlos Enrique Almirante, Roberto Enríquez, Irela Bravo	Drama	
La noche de los inocentes (Night of the Innocents)	Arturo Sotto	Jorge Perugorría, Silvia Águila, Aramís Delgado, Susana Pérez	Drama	
Camino al edén (Road to Eden)	Daniel Díaz Torres	Pilar Punzano, Álvaro de Luna, Lieter Ledesma, Carlos Ever Fonseca, Limara Meneses, Asenneh Rodríguez, Fernando Hechavarría, Salvador Palomino, Raúl Pomares, Jorge Ryan	Historic drama	
Anonimato (Anonymous)	Pablo Javier López	Félix Beatón, Adria Santana, Paula Alí, Julio César Ramírez, Yori Gómez, Alain Aranda	Comedy	
Miranda regresa (Miranda Returns)			Drama	
Manteca, Mondongo y Bacalao con pan (Una mirada al Jazz Cubano) (Fat, guts and Bacalao with bread: A look into Cuban Jazz)	Pavel Giroud		Documentary	
2008
Kangamba	Rogelio París	Rafael Lahera and Armando Tomey	Bellic film	
Personal Belongings	Alejandro Brugués	Caleb Casas and Rubén Breña	Drama	
Los dioses rotos (Fallen gods)	Ernesto Daranas	Carlos Ever Fonseca, Annia Bu, Silvia Águila, Isabel Santos and Héctor Noas	Drama	
Omerta	Pavel Giroud	Manuel Porto, Kike Quiñones	Drama	
El Cuerno de la Abundancia (The horn of abundancy)	Juan Carlos Tabío	Jorge Perugorría, Annia Bu, Vladimir Cruz, Mirtha Ibarra and Enrique Molina	Comedy	
Madre Coraje y sus hijos (Mother Courage and Her Children)	Enrique Álvarez	Daisy Granados	Historic drama	
El viajero inmóvil (The Immobile Traveler)	Tomás Piard	Eslinda Núñez	Drama, anthology	
Ciudad en rojo (City in Red)	Rebeca Chávez	Rafael Ernesto Hernández, Emanxor Oña, Yori Gómez, Carlos Enrique Almirante, Mario Guerra	Historic drama	
2009
Larga distancia (Long Distance)	Esteban Insausti	Alexis Díaz de Villegas, Tomás Cao, Zulema Clares, Mailyn Gómez, Miriam Socarrás, Ania Bu, Coralia Veloz and Verónica Lynn	Drama	
Lisanka	Daniel Díaz Torres	Miriel Cejas, Rafael Ernesto Hernández and Carlos Enrique Almirantes	Romantic comedy	
El premio flaco (The small prize)	Juan Carlos Cremata	Rosa Vasconcelos, Alina Rodríguez, Blanca Rosa Blanco, Paula Alí, Carlos Gonzalvo, Osvaldo Doimeadiós and Luis Alberto García	Drama	
La anunciación (The announcement)	Enrique Pineda Barnet	Verónica Lynn, Héctor Noas, Broselianda Hernández	Drama	
Sons of Cuba	Andrew Lang		Documentary	
Ay, mi amor (Oh, my love!)	Tomás Piard		Drama	

== 2010s ==
Title	Director	Cast	Genre	Notes
2010
José Martí, el ojo del canario (Joseph Martí, Eye of the canary)	Fernando Pérez	Rolando Brito, Broselianda Hernández	Biopic	
Chamaco (Kid)	Juan Carlos Cremata	Pancho García, Laura Ramos, Caleb Casas, Fidel Betancourt, Alina Rodríguez, Luis Alberto García	Drama	
Acorazado (Battleship)	Álvaro Curiel	Luis Alberto García, Laura de la Uz	Comedy	
Casa vieja (Old House)	Lester Hamlet	Yadier Fernández, Adria Santana, Alberto Pujol, Isabel Santos	Drama	
La noche del juicio (The Night of Judgement)	Tomás Piard	Frank Egusquiza, Dania Splinter, Yarlo Ruíz, Carlos Solar		
El más fuerte (The Strongest)	Tomás Piard			
Memories of Overdevelopment (Memorias del Desarrollo)	Miguel Coyula	Ron Blair, Susana Perez	Drama	
Afinidades (Affinities)	Jorge Perugorría, Vladimir Cruz	Jorge Perugorría, Vladimir Cruz	Drama	
La mitad de Óscar (Half of Oscar)	Manuel Martín Cuenca	Verónica Echegui	Drama	Co-production with Spain
2011
Boleto al paraíso (Ticket to Paradise)	Gerardo Chijona	Miriel Cejas, Héctor Medina, Luis Alberto García, Alberto Pujol, Blanca Rosa Blanco, Jorge Perugorría	Drama	
Vinci	Eduardo del Llano	Héctor Medina, Carlos Gonzalvo and Luis Alberto García	Historic drama	
Marina	Enrique Álvarez	Claudia Muñiz, Carlos Enrique Almirante, Marianela Pupo, Mario Limonta, Rosa Vasconcelos	Drama	
Habanastation (Havana's PlayStation)	Ian Padrón	Luis Alberto García, Blanca Rosa Blanco	Coming-of-age	
Extravíos (Strays)	Alejandro Gil	Laura de la Uz		
Fábula (Fable)	Lester Hamlet	Carlos Luis González, Alicia Hechavarría, Sandy Marquetti, Alina Rodríguez, Susana Tejera	Romantic drama	
Mejilla con mejilla (Cheek to Cheek)	Delso Aquino	Rosita Fornés, Jorge Losada	Drama	
La guarida del topo (The Mole's Cave)	Alfredo Ureta	Néstor Jiménez, Ketty de la Iglesia, Rafael Lahera, Alberto Pujol, Héctor Hechemendía	Drama	
Sumbe	Eduardo Moya	Fernando Hechavarría, Jorge Martínez, René de la Cruz Ortiz, Enrique Bueno, Alden Knight	Bellic drama	
Pablo (Paul)	Yosmani Acosta	Omar Franco, Aramís Delgado	Coming-of-age	
Juan de los Muertos (John of the Dead)	Alejandro Brugués	Alexis Díaz de Villegas, Eliécer Ramírez, Jorge Molina Enríquez, Jazz Vilá, Andrea Duro, Antonio Dechent, Blanca Rosa Blanco, Andros Perugorría, Susana Pous, Diana Rosa Suárez	Comedy	
2012
La película de Ana (Ana's film)	Daniel Díaz Torres	Laura de la Uz, Yuliet Cruz, Tomás Cao, Paula Alí, Blanca Rosa Blanco, Jorge Perugorría	Comedy	
Verde Verde (Green Green)	Enrique Pineda Barnet	Héctor Noas		
7 días en La Habana (Seven Days in Havana)	Benicio del Toro, Pablo Trapero, Julio Medem, Elia Suleiman, Gaspar Noé, Juan Carlos Tabío, Laurent Cantet	Josh Hutcherson, Emir Kusturica, Vladimir Cruz, Daniel Brühl, Elia Suleiman, Melvis Estévez, Othello Renzoli, Melissa Rivera	Drama, anthology	
Contigo, pan y cebolla (With You, Bread and Onion)	Juan Carlos Cremata	Alina Rodríguez, Yuliet Cruz	Drama	
Y, sin embargo... (However...)	Rudy Mora	Larisa Vega, Silvio Rodríguez	Coming-of-age	
Amor crónico (Chronic Love)	Jorge Perugorría	Yuliet Cruz	Romance	
Irremediablemente juntos (Inevitably Together)	Jorge Luis Sánchez	Ariadna Núñez	Romantic drama	
Café amargo (Bitter Coffee)	Rigoberto Jiménez	Adela Legrá, Coralia Veloz, Oneida Hernández, Carlos Alberto Méndez	Drama	
Melaza (Melace)	Carlos Lechuga	Yuliet Cruz, Armando Miguel Gómez	Drama	
Penumbras (Darkness)	Carlos Medina	Omar Franco, Omar Alí, Tomás Cao	Drama	
La piscina (The Swimming Pool)	Carlos Machado Quintela		Drama	
Leontina	Rudy Mora	Corina Mestre, Fernando Hechavarría, Omar Alí, Blanca Rosa Blanco	Drama	
Los desastres de la guerra (The Disasters of War)	Tomás Piard	Orián Suárez, Edgar Valle, Dayron Moreno, Carlos Vives, Adrián Olivares, Renny Arozarena, José Luís Hidalgo	Bellic drama	
Una noche (One night)	Laura Mulloy	Dariel Arrechaga, Anailín de la Rúa, Javier Núñez	Drama	
2013
3 Days in Havana	Gil Bellows, Tony Pantages	Gil Bellows, Greg Wise, Rya Kihlstedt		Co-production with Canada
La partida (The Departure)	Antonio Hens	Reinier Díaz, Milton García, Toni Cantó, Mirtha Ibarra, Luis Alberto García	Drama	
Esther en alguna parte (Esther Somewhere)	Gerardo Chijona	Reynaldo Miravalles, Eslinda Núñez	Drama	Co-production with Peru
Si vas a comer, espera por Virgilio (If you're gonna eat, wait for Virgil)	Tomás Piard	Iván García, Javier Casas, Valia Valdés	Drama	
Se Vende (For Sale)	Jorge Perugorría	Jorge Perugorría, Dailenis Fuentes, Mirtha Ibarra, Mario Balmaseda	Black comedy	
Boccaccerías habaneras (Havana's Boccaccio)	Arturo Sotto	Félix Beatón, Mario Guerra, Claudia Álvarez, Yadier Fernández, Omar Franco, Luis Alberto García, Ulises Aquino, Yudith Castillo, Yerlín Pérez, Patricio Wood, Yordanka Ariosa, Luis Ángel Batista, Irela Bravo	Comedy	
2014
La pared de las palabras (Wall of Words)	Fernando Pérez	Jorge Perugorría, Isabel Santos	Drama	
Vestido de novia (Wedding Dress)	Marylin Solaya	Luis Alberto García, Laura de la Uz	Drama	
Omega 3	Eduardo del Llano	Omar Franco, Carlos Massola	Science fiction, comedy	
Conducta (Behavior)	Ernesto Daranas	Alina Rodríguez, Yuliet Cruz, Héctor Noas, Armando Miguel Gómez	Drama	
Venecia (Venice)	Kiki Álvarez	Claudia Muñiz, Maribel Garcia Garzón, Marianela Pupo	Drama	
2015
Espejuelos oscuros (Dark Sunglasses)	Jessica Rodríguez	Laura de la Uz	Drama	
Viva	Paddy Breathnach	Héctor Medina, Jorge Perugorría, Luis Alberto García	Drama	
El acompañante (The Companion)	Pavel Giroud	Camila Arteche	Drama	
Esteban (Steven)	Jonal Cosculluela	Yuliet Cruz, Manuel Porto, Raúl Pomares, Corina Mestre, Mónica Alonso	Drama	
Cuba Libre (Free Cuba)	Jorge Luis Sánchez	Manuel Porto, Isabel Santos, Georgina Almanza	Historic drama	
La cosa humana (The Human Thing)	Gerardo Chijona	Héctor Medina	Comedy	
La ciudad (The City)	Tomás Piard			
La emboscada (The Ambush)	Alejandro Gil	Patricio Wood, Caleb Casas, Tomás Cao, Armando Miguel Gómez	Bellic drama	
Buquenque	Alberto Yoel García	Osmany García, Alberto Yoel García	Comedy	
Todos se van (Everybody is leaving)	Sergio Cabrera	Yoima Valdés, Abel Rodríguez, Tahimí Alvariño, Caleb Casas	Drama	
Regreso a Ítaca (Return to Ithaca)	Laurent Cantet	Isabel Santos, Jorge Perugorría, Fernando Hechavarría, Néstor Jiménez, Pedro Julio Díaz	Drama	
Vuelos prohibidos (Forbidden Flights)	Rigoberto López	Pablo FG, Sanaa Alaoui, Daysi Granados, Mario Balmaseda, Manuel Porto	Romantic drama	
2016
Últimos días en La Habana (Last Days in Havana)	Fernando Pérez	Jorge Martínez, Patricio Wood	Drama/comedy	
Ya no es antes (Yesterday is no more)	Lester Hamlet	Isabel Santos, Luis Alberto García	Drama	
Bailando con Margot (Dancing with Margo)	Arturo Santana	Edwin Fernández, Mirtha Ibarra, Yia Caamaño, Carlos Massola, Rolando Chiong	Film noir	
2017
Los buenos demonios (The Good Demons)	Gerardo Chijona	Carlos Enrique Almirante, Enrique Molina, Yailene Sierra, Isabel Santos, Aramís Delgado	Drama/comedy	
¿Por qué lloran mis amigas? (Why are my friends crying?)	Magda González Grau	Edith Massola, Luisa María Jiménez, Yasmín Gómez, Amarilys Núñez, Patricio Wood, Roque Moreno	Drama	
Sergio y Serguéi (Sergio and Sergei)	Ernesto Daranas	Tomás Cao, Armando Miguel Gómez, Héctor Noas, Mario Guerra, Yuliet Cruz, Ron Perlman	Comedy	
Buena Vista Social Club: Adios	Lucy Walker		Documentary	Co-production with the United States and the United Kingdom
The End of Time	Milcho Manchevski			Co-production with the United States
2018
Inocencia (Innocence)	Alejandro Gil	Héctor Noas, Osvaldo Doimeadiós, Caleb Casas, Jorge Luis López	Historic drama	
A Translator (Un Traductor)	Rodrigo Barriuso, Sebastián Barriuso	Rodrigo Santoro, Maricel Alvarez, Yoandra Suarez	Drama	Cuban-Canadian coproduction
Yuli	Icíar Bollaín	Yerlín Pérez, Santiago Alfonso, Laura de la Uz	Drama, biopic	
El regreso (The Return)	Alberto Luberta Martínez, Blanca Rosa Blanco	Blanca Rosa Blanco, Verónica Lynn, Yasmín Gómez, Yadier Fernández, Rafael Lahera, Osvaldo Doimeadiós	Detective film	
El viaje extraordinario de Celeste García (The Extraordinary Journey of Celeste García)	Arturo Infante	María Isabel Díaz, Omar Franco	Science fiction	
Insumisas (Unsubmission)	Fernando Pérez and Laura Cazador		Historic drama	
Nido de Mantis (Mantis' Nest)	Arturo Sotto	Claudia Álvarez, Armando Miguel Gómez, Carlos Enrique Almirante	Romantic drama	
2019
A media voz (In a Whisper)	Patricia Pérez Fernández and Heidi Hassan		Documentary	
Habana Selfies (Havana Selfies)	Arturo Santana		Romantic drama	
El Mayor (The Major)	Rigoberto López		Biopic	
Buscando a Casal (Looking For Casal)	Jorge Luis Sánchez	Yasmany Guerrero, Blanca Rosa Blanco, Armando Miguel Gómez	Biopic	
Agosto (August)		Rafael Lahera	Drama	
La espuma de los días (The Froth of Days)	Fernando Timosi	Hugo Reyes, Lieter Ledesma, Corina Mestre	Drama	

== 2020s ==
Title	Director	Cast	Genre	Notes
2021
Corazón Azul (Blue Heart)	Miguel Coyula		Sci-fi	
Tundra	José Luis Aparicio		Drama	
2023
Los océanos son los verdaderos continentes (Oceans Are the Real Continents)	Tommaso Santambrogio		Drama	Co-production with Italy
2025
Anba dlo	Luiza Calagian, Rosa Caldeira	Berline Charles, Feguenson Hermogène	Short drama	
The Leap	Roberto Tarazona	Fabián Olmo Águila, Christian Águila Almeida	Short documentary	

== See also ==
- Cinema of Cuba
- Cinema of the Caribbean
- Instituto Cubano del Arte e Industria Cinematográficos
