= The Man from Maisinicu =

1973 film

- Directed by: Manuel Pérez
- Written by: Victor Casaus; Manuel Pérez
- Starring: Sergio Corrieri
- Cinematography: Jorge Herrera
- Release date: July 1973
- Running time: 124 minutes
- Country: Cuba
- Language: Spanish

The Man from Maisinicu (Spanish: El hombre de Maisinicú) is a 1973 Cuban thriller drama film directed by Manuel Pérez. It was entered into the 8th Moscow International Film Festival where Sergio Corrieri won the award for Best Actor.

It also won the FIPRESCI Prize (Special Mention) for Pérez.

== Cast ==
- Mario Balmaseda
- Reynaldo Miravalles
- Miguel Benavides
- Rogelio Blain
- Iván Colas
- Sergio Corrieri
- Enrique Domínguez
- Raúl Eguren
- Enrique Molina

== See also ==
- List of Cuban films
