= Rogelio Blaín =

Cuban actor

- Born: Rogelio Juan Blaín Blaín; 24 August 1944; Havana, Cuba
- Died: 13 May 2018 (aged 73); Havana, Cuba
- Occupation: Actor
- Known for: Lucio Contreras in Brave Land (Tierra Brava)

Rogelio Juan Blaín Blaín; 24 August 1944 – 13 May 2018) was a Cuban actor of radio, television, and film. He has received many awards through his career, including the Cuban Radio and Television Praiseworthy Artist.

== Life and career ==
Blaín was born in Havana in 1944. He started as an amateur actor. In 1966, Humberto Solás, who had had success with Manuela, was looking for actors to film Lucía, and he selected Blaín to become part of the cast. He played an important role in the film: second part of the film's Antonio.

He took part on the cast of the Cuban Television, although he has stated that he prefers doing films because that has paved him the way. On stage he met his colleagues and friends Enrique Molina and Enrique Almirante, who share stage in several times. As for 2013, Blaín takes part in Cuban television series S.O.S Academia (S.O.S Academy).

He passed away in 2018, after a long battle with cancer.

== Selected filmography ==
| Year | Title | Director(s) | Notes |
|---|---|---|---|
| 1968 | Lucía | Humberto Solás | Film |
| 1973 | Ustedes tienen la palabra | Manuel Octavio Gómez | Film |
| 1973 | El Hombre de Maisinicú | Manuel Pérez | Film |
| 1976 | Patty Candela | Rogelio París and Jorge Fraga. | Film |
| 1977 | Río Negro | Manuel Pérez | Film |
| 1978 | Una mujer, un hombre, una ciudad | Manuel Octavio Gómez | Film |
| 1981 | Leyenda | Rogelio París | Film |
| 1981 | Polvo Rojo | Jesús Díaz | Film |
| 1982 | Alsino y el cóndor | Miguel Littín | Film (Cuba-Chile) |
| 1983 | Hasta cierto punto | Tomás Gutiérrez Alea | Film |
| 1982 | Alsino y el cóndor | Miguel Littín | Film |
| 1985 | Lejanía | Jesús Díaz | Film |
| 1985 | Baraguá | José Massip | Film |
| 1988 | El unicornio | Enrique Colina | Fiction short film |
| 1994 | Reina y Rey | Julio García Espinosa | Film |
| 1995 | Pon tu pensamiento en mí | Arturo Sotto | Film |
| 2000 | Hacerse el sueco | Daniel Díaz Torres | Film |
| 2009 | Lisanka | Daniel Díaz Torres | Film |
