= Ticket to Paradise =

Ticket to Paradise may refer to:

- Ticket to Paradise (1936 film), an American drama film directed by Aubrey Scotto
- Ticket to Paradise (1961 film), a British comedy film directed by Francis Searle
- Ticket to Paradise (1962 film), a Swedish drama film directed by Arne Mattsson
- Ticket to Paradise (2008 film), a Danish feature documentary film directed by Janus Metz Pedersen
- Ticket to Paradise (2011 film), a Cuban drama film written and directed by Gerardo Chijona
- Ticket to Paradise (2022 film), an American romantic comedy film starring George Clooney and Julia Roberts

== See also ==
- "Two Tickets to Paradise", a 1978 song by Eddie Money
- Two Tickets to Paradise (film), an unrelated 2006 film
