= Corrieri =

Corrieri is a surname. Notable people with the surname include:

- Giovanni Corrieri (1920–2017), Italian cyclist
- Sergio Corrieri (1939–2008), Cuban actor
