= Río Negro (film) =

1977 film

- Directed by: Manuel Pérez
- Written by: Victor Casaus; Manuel Pérez
- Starring: Mario Balmaseda
- Cinematography: Jorge Herrera
- Release date: July 1977
- Running time: 135 minutes
- Country: Cuba
- Language: Spanish

Río Negro (literally Black River) is a 1977 Cuban documentary film about class struggle in the Escambray mountain range in Cuba. It was directed by Manuel Pérez. The film was entered into the 10th Moscow International Film Festival where it won the Special Prize.

== Cast ==
- Mario Balmaseda
- Sergio Corrieri
- René de la Cruz
- Alejandro Lugo
- Raúl Pomares
- Nelson Villagra

== See also ==
- List of Cuban films
