= The Last Supper (1976 film) =

- Directed by: Tomás Gutiérrez Alea
- Screenplay by: Tomás González; María Eugenia Haya; Tomás Gutiérrez Alea
- Produced by: ICAIC
- Starring: Nelson Villagra; Silvano Rey Jose Antonio Rodriguez; Luns Alberto Garcia; Samuel Claxton; Mario Balmaseda
- Cinematography: Mario García Joya
- Edited by: Nelson Rodríguez
- Music by: Leo Brouwer
- Release dates: December 1976 (Spain); October 1977 (USA); November 1977 (Cuba)
- Running time: 120 mins
- Country: Cuba
- Language: Spanish

The Last Supper (Spanish: La última cena) a 1976 Cuban historical film directed by Tomás Gutiérrez Alea, produced by the Instituto Cubano del Arte y la Industria Cinematográficos (ICAIC) and starring Nelson Villagra as the Count.

== Synopsis ==
The film tells the story of a pious Havana plantation owner in the 1790s, during Cuba's Spanish colonial period. The plantation owner decides to recreate the Biblical Last Supper using twelve of the slaves working in his sugarcane fields, with himself as Christ. Whilst they eat and drink, he also feeds them religious rhetoric and attempts to instruct them in the workings of Christianity. He promises them a day off for the following Good Friday and commits to freeing one of the slaves. However, when these promises are not held up the next day, the slaves rebel. The slaves are then hunted down and killed by their master, all except one who escapes.

== See also ==
- List of Cuban films
- List of films featuring slavery
