= The Other Francisco =

1975 film

- Directed by: Sergio Giral
- Written by: Julio García Espinosa; Tomás Gutiérrez Alea; Sergio Giral
- Starring: Margarita Balboa Miguel Benavides Armando Bianchi Alden Knight Adolfo Llauradó Susana Pérez Alina Sánchez Ramón Veloz
- Cinematography: Livio Delgado
- Release date: July 1975
- Running time: 97 minutes
- Country: Cuba
- Language: Spanish

The Other Francisco (Spanish: El otro Francisco) is a 1975 Cuban drama film directed by Sergio Giral. It was entered into the 9th Moscow International Film Festival where Miguel Benavides won the award for Best Actor.

== History ==
The film is based on a novel called "Francisco" by Anselmo Suárez y Romero where he makes a socio-economic analysis of slavery and class struggle. The film and novel's goal consists of realistic expose of slavery conditions throughout the American History. It also offers a critical analysis of the novel, showing how the author's social background led to his use of particular dramatic structures to convey his liberal, humanitarian viewpoint. El otro Francisco (The Other Francisco) film has a view point of two different scenarios, one is a more of a straight adaptation of the novel and a host of Romantic clichés about a tragic love story. While the second approach only broadens the story’s scope in a Marxist critique that includes an uglier version of slavery that was ignored by the author.

== Plot ==
The film starts off with the perspective of Anselmo Suárez y Romero's original novel, Francisco was sold at the age of 10 but was taught how to read and write by the head mistress of the sugar cane plantation named Senora Mendlzabal. Francisco worked in the stables for a number of years and discovered one of the maids working for Señora named Dorota. The two quickly fell in love and Francisco pleaded to Senora to marry Dorota a multitude of times but was constantly denied. Their secret love was discovered by Senora however and was quickly put a stop to by whipping Francisco and moving Dorota to work for a Frenchmen for a time. During the time Dorota was gone an incident with Francisco occurred with the story of him assaulting an overseer and letting out a number of horses. This story landed Francisco into working in the fields hours on end by an overseer and commanded by Senora's son named Ricardo who has a secret attraction to Dorota. Dorota returns in shock about the news of Francisco and pleads to Senora to pardon Francisco. Senora refused and saying she was too disappointed with Francisco to deserve a pardon right now. After advising Dorota to forget about Francisco, Senora leaves the planation. Ricardo tries to force himself onto but senses that Dorota still has feelings for Francisco. After this rejection, anytime anything went wrong all the blame would be put on Francisco. Francisco was contently working in the fields to the point of dehydration and was whipped as punishment. After finding Francisco at the nursing home barley conscious after the whipping. Dorota agrees to sleep with Ricardo in order to clam his anger against Francisco. Later, Francisco was finally pardon by Senora and could marry Dorota but Dorota rejects him. She reveled to Francisco that she had to sleep with Ricardo in order to save Francisco life and that he should forget about her. After this revel she leaves in tears, Francisco is left in anger and frustration in the woods. Francisco was discovered sometime later reveling that he had hanged himself.

The film has an interview with the author of Angelo Suárez y Romero that goes on to explain on why he written the story of a love triangle instead of the tragedy of being a slave. Anselmo Suárez y Romero said "he was too young to fully comprehend the suffering of being a slave" and he doesn't consider Francisco a regular slave due to his ability to read and write. This interview goes on how this novel softens the blow on what true slavery was and was tamed in order to be successful novel.

The film moves into its second act with a slave who tried to run away but is dragged back to the plantation. They force the slave to wear a cowbell at all times to know where he's at, chain up his feet and left him in the shed for hours. Francisco then comes by and offers the slave some water. They quickly bond and the slave invites Francisco to a rebellion meeting where they plan to sabotaging the plantation. They burn down a bagasse shed which angers the overseers. The film then shifts to an interview of a man named Richard Madden who is an agent of the British Empire. Madden revels that slaves are becoming more and more unnecessary with the increase of machines, the Spanish Empire has enough power to stop the slave trade but doesn't have to the desire to, that more colored people live on the Cuban Island then white people and that fear is the only thing holding back the slaves from revolting. Madden then visits the plantation in order to seek any violations of the treaty Spain has in order to end the slave trade, reason being if the slave trade was gone, then the British Empire could attain economic balance to permit capitalist growth and in order to secure a market for the rise of machines. One of the slaves sabotage a sugar cane machine and Ricardo demanded the overseer to find out who did it. Overseer blames Francisco and is the one made example of and brutally whipped to death. The film ends in a bloody rebellion. Slaves begun burning crops and sheds. They resorted into killing their overseers. The film then concludes with the many rebellions that was happening in Cuba around the early 1800's

== See also ==
- List of Cuban films
