= Habaneceres =

Cuban documentary film

- Directed by: Luis Leonel León
- Screenplay by: Luis Leonel León
- Produced by: Yan Vega
- Cinematography: Arnold Díaz; Ernesto García; Luis Leonel León
- Edited by: Abel Raymond
- Production companies: Facultad de Medios Audiovisuales; Instituto Superior de Arte
- Release date: 2001
- Running time: 22 minutes
- Country: Cuba
- Language: Spanish

Habaneceres is a Cuban documentary film, directed in 2001 by Luis Leonel León. The documentary received awards at film festivals and was selected by the Cuban Film Press Association, affiliated with the International Federation of Film Press (FIPRESCI), as the best film of 2001 in its genre.

== Plot ==
The film's protagonist is Havana, used by the filmmaker in a symbolic way to expose the "material and spiritual crisis of the end of the century and the beginning of the new century" in Cuba, through the testimonies of four Havana creators: playwright Alberto Pedro, filmmaker Fernando Pérez, singer-songwriter Carlos Varela and writer Leonardo Padura, who share nostalgia, regrets and longings for their city and their country; and relate fragments of their experiences, from the happiest to the most terrible moments, such as the Mariel exodus, the Maleconazo and the balseros' crisis, key events in the history of the Cuban Revolution. Alberto Pedro says "We conduct ourselves inside the deterioration as if we were in Paris. Each one of us has a city inside", while Fernando Pérez warns that "no collective dream, no utopia is realized if it is not formed by the yearnings of each individual", quoting Ho Chi Min: "Never has the dawn been closer than when the night has been darkest."

== Production ==
The documentary, which was the practical part of the graduation thesis of its scriptwriter and director, was shot with a non-professional camera in Havana's neighborhoods and municipalities such as Arroyo Naranjo, El Vedado, La Víbora, Mantilla, Old Havana, Centro Habana, among others, and uses archive images and fragments of the films Madagascar (1994) and Life Is to Whistle by Fernando Pérez to emphasize its intellectual or ideological montage.

== Release ==
Its premiere was in August 2001 at the Riviera movie theater in El Vedado, in the club that singer-songwriter Gerardo Alfonso had at the time. It was later screened at La Rampa, at the closing ceremony of the Cine Plaza National Film and Video Festival, where it won the Grand Documentary Award.

Because of its critical approach, the film was censored on Cuban television. León declared that Cuban authorities also "wanted to eliminate it from the Havana International Film Festival" in December 2001. "But they had the bad luck that filmmaker Fernando Perez was involved in the festival that year and said, very bravely, if they removed it he would be forced to resign from the festival because he could not support such an action against a film where he not only participated, but where he expressed himself against censorship. Fernando thus put them up against the wall. In the end they allowed it to be shown at the festival, but with a trick: they didn't let it compete, they assigned it to a selection called Made in Cuba and screened it only two or three times at inaccessible times and in small theaters".

In 2003 it was screened at the Chaplin Hall (Cinemateca de Cuba) during the II Muestra Nacional de Nuevos Realizadores ICAIC, where it won the Jury's Special Prize.

Outside the island, it has been screened at the Casa de América in Madrid, the Instituto de Estudios Hispánicos de Canarias, the Filmoteca Española, the University of La Laguna and other cultural and academic centers in Spain, Europe, Latin America and the United States. Miami television stations such as América TeVé (channel 41) and Radio y Televisión Martí have broadcast it preceded by interviews with its director.

== Reception ==
In the essay "Insurgencia, dinámica y potestad del cine joven en Cuba", included in the book "Conquistando la utopía: El ICAIC y la Revolución 50 años después", a compilation of texts published by Ediciones ICAIC, film critic and journalist Joel del Río cites Habaneceres as one of the "essential works of young Cuban cinema" and places it among the films of the time that express "disenchantment, pessimism and anti-utopia" in the sociopolitical context.

Habaneceres, according to writer and journalist Grethel Delgado, is "a documentary that goes beyond the precincts of the genre and navigates in video art, in the image that creatively narrates beyond the testimonial, the document. It shows this city of more than 500 years with the VHS filter, like those childhood videos where we sing 'happy birthday', that we watch when nostalgia presses, and where we look for the neighbor who left, died or forgot. In the voice of the creators of the island Leon transports us to a myriad of sensations, colors, smells and sadness, so that if you are in that specific state of sensitivity, you may end up crying. I have done it and it has been an act of cleansing. With a special force, the faces of those listless but sometimes smiling habaneros, who are happy in a strange way, impossible to define, are fixed in the memory. The eyes of the little girl looking down from a balcony, like two promises, also stick in our minds. Where is that woman now, one might ask. The magic of cinema, which stops everything in the image".

In the essay "La Habana, imagen y escritura", film critic Gustavo Arcos states: "Another perspective will be assumed by the young Luis Leonel León in his melancholic and award-winning documentary, Habaneceres (2001). His proposal resorts to a more traditional visual language that concentrates its attention not so much on formal experimentation as on the testimonies of the four interviewed figures to give an image no less dramatic or unreal of Havana, that image that somehow idealized by nostalgia and the passage of time, survives in the memory of those who inhabit it, provoking a curious and inevitable conflict between the past and the present, between desire and reality, a chimerical fight against the demons of oblivion".

Essayist and film critic Juan Antonio García Borrero wrote in 2011: "cities impose on us their own ways of expressing themselves. Or their own metalanguage, describing that which will always be beyond what conventional language can apprehend. I think a bit of this is said in Luis Leonel León's beautiful documentary Habaneceres: the interviewees agree in feeling fascination for something we have not seen, but in any case we have (pre)felt, or continue to sense in its illuminating mystery.".

In the program "En profundidad" of Radio y Televisión Martí, journalist Alfredo Jacomino interviews Leon and assures that the filmmaker "did not live Havana in its splendor, he could not witness the charm (neither of the store nor of the adjective) and yet he loves it. And he who loves something, even if it is old and battered, deserves a bow".

== Awards ==
- Best Documentary of the Year. Cuban Association of the Cinematographic Press, 2001.
- Documentary Grand Prize. Cine Plaza National Film and Video Festival, 2001.
- First Prize. Imago Festival, 2001.
- Special Award. Almacén de la Imagen Festival of Camagüey, 2001.
- Special Jury Award. II National Exhibition of New Filmmakers ICAIC, 2003.
- Made in Cuba Selection of the 23rd International Festival of New Latin American Cinema of Havana, 2001.
- Selection Horizontes del Sur Festival. La Havane: dans la litterature, le cinema, et les arts visuels contemporains, France, 2002.
- Official Selection Festival of Alternative Cuban Cimena, Little Havana, Miami, 2003.
