= Portrait of Teresa =

1979 film

- Film poster
- Directed by: Pastor Vega
- Written by: Ambrosio Fornet; Pastor Vega
- Produced by: Evelio Delgado
- Starring: Daisy Granados
- Cinematography: Livio Delgado
- Release date: August 1979
- Running time: 103 minutes
- Country: Cuba
- Language: Spanish

Portrait of Teresa (Spanish: Retrato de Teresa) is a 1979 Cuban drama film directed by Pastor Vega. It was entered into the 11th Moscow International Film Festival. Daisy Granados won the award for Best Actress.

== Cast ==
- Idalia Anreus
- Miguel Benavides
- Samuel Claxton
- Elsa Gay
- Daisy Granados as Teresa
- Adolfo Llauradó as Ramón
- Germán Pinelli
- Raúl Pomares
- Alina Sánchez

== See also ==
- List of Cuban films
