= Habana Eva =

- Directed by: Fina Torres
- Written by: Jorge Camacho; Julio Carrillo; Fina Torres
- Produced by: Delfina Catalá; Marco Mundaraín; Camilo Vives; Fina Torres
- Starring: Prakriti Maduro; Juan Carlos García
- Distributed by: Villa del Cine
- Release date: 21 July 2010
- Running time: 100 minutes
- Country: Venezuela
- Language: Spanish

Habana Eva is a 2010 Venezuelan romantic comedy film directed by Fina Torres, starring Prakriti Maduro and Juan Carlos García and filmed in Havana, Cuba.

The film won the Best International Feature award at the New York International Latino Film Festival and Best Feature Film at the Los Angeles Latino International Film Festival.

== Synopsis ==
Eva (Maduro) works in a Havana clothing factory as a seamstress. She has bigger dreams than this, wanting to become a fashion designer but also to have a home of her own that she can share with Angel (Almirante), her reliable long-term boyfriend. In the slums one day she sees photographer Jorge (García), an exile raised in Venezuela, compiling architecture photography of the city. A chance encounter brings her upon a career opportunity, aligning with her romantic turmoil.

== Cast ==
- Prakriti Maduro as Eva
- Juan Carlos García as Jorge
- Carlos Enrique Almirante as Angel
- Yuliet Cruz as Teresa

== Reception ==
The Hollywood Reporter described the film as "[a]n agreeably indulgent slice of escapist wish fulfillment [that] charms with its breezy style and appealing performances", saying that it aligns well for the mass markets and art-house festivals both. It suggests that the film's light and fast pace distracts from the improbability of some events, and that the "shift toward lighthearted magical realism in the latter half [...] manages to suitably support the film's fantasy arc".

Ronnie Scheib of Variety also complements how it is "[l]iberally dusted with magic realism", suggesting that is a more successfully executed version of Torres' landmark Woman on Top, with a more Latin sentiment. Schieb writes that the "graceful flow" of "Havana’s open spaces facilitat[ing] movement [...] brings the city's streets and inhabitants into the frame, not as touristy backdrops but as integral elements in an ongoing pageant", which "comes as a breath of fresh air".

The film has a 62% fresh rating on Rotten Tomatoes.
