= Madagascar (1994 film) =

- Directed by: Fernando Pérez
- Written by: Fernando Pérez; Manuel Rodríguez
- Produced by: Santiago Llapur
- Starring: Elena Bolaños; Zaida Castellanos; Laura De la Uz
- Cinematography: Raúl Pérez Ureta
- Edited by: Julia Yip
- Music by: Edesio Alejandro
- Release date: 1994
- Running time: 50 minutes
- Country: Cuba
- Language: Spanish

Madagascar is a 1994 Cuban film that marked Fernando Pérez's change of direction into a more lyrical approach to filmmaking, somehow stripped from the realistic documentary feel of his early work. The film chronicles the relationship and lack of communication between a mother and daughter during the Cuban economic crisis known as the Special Period.

== Background and plot synopsis ==
Madagascar was originally conceived as the first part of a trilogy to be entitled 'Pronóstico del tiempo' ("Weather Prediction"). The production and post-production of director Fernando Pérez's third fiction film was completed in September 1993 to await the preparation of the work's other two parts: 'Melodrama' ("Melodrama," dir. Rolando Díaz) and 'Quiéreme y verás' ("Love me and you’ll see," dir. Daniel Díaz Torres). The three directors had worked together to develop their ideas for the creation of the project, but in the end, according to Pérez, the films wound up lacking the necessary continuity necessary to bind them together. Partly as a result of such concerns over their contents, and partly in response to the delays caused by an ongoing shortage of production funds for Díaz's and Díaz Torres' works, each film ended up being released independently. During December 1994, over one year after the completion of its post-production, Madagascar first appeared in Cuba's theatres as part of the annual New Latin American Film Festival held in Havana.

Madagascar was inspired by the 1984 Mirta Yáñez short story "Beatles contra Duran Duran" ("Beatles Against Duran Duran"). The story chronicles the relationship between the narrator, who is a single mother and pragmatic middle-aged professor of physics, and her moody adolescent daughter. The plot of the film draws loosely from the original text, which Pérez appears to have used as a point of departure and a rough character sketch as he worked closely with cinematographer Raúl Pérez Ureta and screenwriter Manuel Antonio Rodríguez during the developmental stages of the project. Laura (played by Zaida Castellanos) and Laurita (played by Laura de la Uz) are the central characters of the film and bear an obvious resemblance to the unnamed narrator of the short story and her daughter, Pilar. However, the film's mode of expression as well as its plot both diverge greatly from that of the story.

The main characters' opposing personalities form the focal points of the film's narrative, which becomes a sort of psychological travelogue. During the opening sequence, we learn that Laura's life has entered into a mysterious psychological crisis, exacerbated by her daughter's extreme behavior. In an opening monologue, she tells us that she has lost the ability to dream anything different from what she experiences in her daily life. This monologue, and ostensibly the rest of Laura's ongoing voice-over narration, occurs in the context of a consultation with an unseen doctor. From then on, the plot focuses around Laura's internal conflicts and her relationship with her daughter. In an early scene, Laurita informs her mother that she has grown tired of school and will be taking a break from her studies in order to travel to Madagascar. In response, Laura becomes furious and criticizes Laurita for indulging in such frivolous fantasies. Increasingly disaffected, Laurita proceeds to undergo a series of personality transformations. This disturbs Laura, who is frustrated with the stagnant conditions of her own life, but cannot make such sudden changes.

Laura and Laurita live together with Laura's elderly mother (Elena Bolaños), and are accompanied by a reticent young painter known only as Molina (Jorge Molina) who appears to have befriended Laurita. Throughout the film, the family moves often, changing homes four times. The film has the episodic quality of a road movie as much of the exposition thus takes place in the midst of the family's relocations. The climax occurs when, following a particularly difficult argument with her mother, Laurita decides to run away from home. She returns after a few days, but the experience has altered both her and her mother. In the final scene, the two have practically traded personalities, and it is Laura who tells her daughter, "nos vamos de viaje para Madagascar" ("we’re going to travel to Madagascar").

The creators of the film bore the circumstances of its production admirably well. Prior to the collapse of the Soviet Union, ICAIC had imported all of its film and development chemicals from the USSR and its economic allies. The lack of chemicals on the island after 1991 forced Madagascar’s production unit to mail all of their negatives to a lab in Venezuela, making "dailies," or the practice of reviewing each day's shooting and then re-filming whatever did not turn out as planned, impossible. Despite being forced to "shoot blind," as it were, Pérez maintains that he and his crew did not lack any truly fundamental supplies (besides gasoline, which was in scarce supply throughout the island by mid-1993). Nevertheless, the director did believe at the time that it would be his last film and such conditions may have played a significant role in the development of the film's style and plot.

To date, Madagascar and the other pieces intended to make up "Pronóstico del tiempo" remain some of the last films to receive all of their production funds exclusively from el Instituto Cubano de Arte e Industria Cinematográficos (ICAIC, the "Cuban Institute for the Film Art and Industry"). During the early 1990s, the Cuban economy had fallen on hard times and ICAIC's budget suffered accordingly. By 1995, the small, semi-autonomous, national industry that had been producing independent works since 1959 had to restructure itself to meet the demands of the international market. Co-productions with outside organizations, intended for release in foreign markets became the only available means of survival.

== Awards ==
- Berlin International Film Festival - Caligari Film Award

- Festróia - Tróia International Film Festival - Golden Dolphin

- Fribourg International Film Festival - Grand Prix

- Havana Film Festival - ARCI-NOVA Award Fernando Pérez

- Cuban Press Association Award - FIPRESCI Prize - Special Mention - Special Jury Prize

- Sundance Film Festival - Latin America Cinema Award

== See also ==
- List of Cuban films
- Cinema of Cuba

== Sources ==
Chanan, Michael. Cuban Cinema. Minneapolis, MN: U of Minnesota Press, 2004. ISBN 0-8166-3424-6

García Borrero, Juan Antonio. Guía Crítica Del Cine Cubano de Ficción. La Habana, Cuba: Editorial Arte y Literatura, 2001. ISBN 959-03-0124-X
