= Alejandro Moya =

Cuban writer and film director

Alejandro Moya (born 1969), commonly nicknamed Iskander, is one of the merging figures of the contemporary independent Cuban cinema. Director and scriptwriter of series for Cuban television, Moya directed his first feature film entitled Mañana (Tomorrow) in 2006, casting Rafael E. Hernández, Enrique Molina, Hugo Reyes, Violeta Rodriguez and Adria Santana. Mañana (Tomorrow) has been presented by the ICAIC (Cuban Institute of Arts and Cinematographic Industry) which registered it as a competition movie in the 2006 Festival of the New Latin American Cinema of Havana.

== Biography ==
As a multi-faceted artist, Iskander is not only a cinema director, but he is also a TV director, a scriptwriter and a poet. When Alejandro Moya was a child, his father – one of the most renowned directors of the last 50 years’ Cuban TV - gave him the nickname of "Iskander", which was actually the Persian name of Alexander the Great. Since then, Alejandro kept it as his artist pseudonym. Always having considered esthetism as the supreme expression of art, Iskander regarded the 7th art as the better way to convey the social dimension of his message. As an independent filmmaker, financially supported by non-etatic funds, Moya directed his first movie in 2006. The film, entitled Mañana (Tomorrow), was produced with a very low budget and with the support of several Cuban artists – such as Silvio Rodríguez, Juan Formell, Ernesto Rancaño, Carlos Guzmán and Kcho - as well as of the own stars of the movie and the ICAIC. Mañana (Tomorrow) can be defined as a critical trip to the interior of a Cuban family that lives with some economic comfort. In other words, the movie features a new artistic but realistic vision of today's Cuba : its conflicts, its human miseries, its tolerances, its excesses... and Cuban people's wish of living "above the reality". The movie was successful, and made Alejandro Moya recognised as one of the merging talents of Cuba cinematography. Alejandro Moya is currently working on his next movie, which theme will center around the Cuban diaspora.

== Filmography ==
- Mañana (Tomorrow) – 2006
- Director : Alejandro Moya
- Scriptwriter : Alejandro Moya
- Format : High Digital Video Definition / Celluloid
- Producer : Adriana Moya (Alejandro Moya's sister)
- Photography : Angel Alderete
- Editor : Carlos Alberto Carnero / Alejandro Moya
- Soundtrack : Esteban Vásquez
- Cast : Rafael E. Hernández, Enrique Molina, Hugo Reyes, Violeta Rodriguez, Adriá Santana
