= Mina, Wind of Freedom =

1977 film

- Directed by: Antonio Eceiza
- Written by: Antonio Eceiza
- Produced by: Héctor López
- Starring: José Alonso
- Release dates: July 1977 (Moscow); 18 September 1977 (Mexico)
- Running time: 119 minutes
- Country: Mexico
- Language: Spanish

Mina, Wind of Freedom (Spanish: Mina, viento de libertad) is a 1975 Spanish drama film directed by Antonio Eceiza. It was entered into the 10th Moscow International Film Festival.

== Cast ==
- José Alonso
- Pedro Armendáriz Jr.
- Héctor Bonilla
- Sergio Corrieri
- Rosaura Revueltas
- Eslinda Núñez
- Fernando Balzaretti
- Roger Cudney as Colonel Young
