= Daisy Granados =

Cuban actress

- Born: 9 December 1942 (age 83); Cienfuegos, Cuba
- Occupation: Actress
- Years active: 1964–present
- Spouse: Pastor Vega (died 2005)

Daisy Granados (born 9 December 1942) is a Cuban film actress. She has appeared in more than 40 films since 1964. At the 11th Moscow International Film Festival in 1979, she won the award for Best Actress for her role in the drama film Portrait of Teresa. In 1985, she was a member of the jury at the 14th Moscow International Film Festival. She was married to writer/director Pastor Vega until his death in Havana, Cuba.

== Partial filmography ==
- La decisión (1964)
- Tulipa (1967)
- Memories of Underdevelopment (1968) - Elena
- The Challenges (1969) - Floritica (segment 3)
- Páginas del diario de José Martí (1972)
- Portrait of Teresa (1979) - Teresa
- Son o no son (1980)
- Cecilia (1982) - Cecilia
- Habanera (1984) - Laura
- A Successful Man (1986) - Rita
- Amor en campo minado (1987)
- A Very Old Man with Enormous Wings (1988) - Elisenda
- Demasiado miedo a la vida o Plaff (1988) - Concha
- Lágrimas al desayuno (1989, Short) - Vicenta Barnet
- Wenn du groß bist, lieber Adam (1990) - Caroline
- Palabras de mujer (1990, Short) - Vicenta Barnet
- María Antonia (1990) - Nena Capitolio
- La soledad de la jefa de despacho (1990, Short)
- Tirano Banderas (1993) - Doña Rosita Pintado
- Vidas paralelas (1993)
- Sueño Tropical (1993)
- El elefante y la bicicleta (1994) - Da. Mercedes, La gitana
- Things I Left in Havana (1997) - María
- Rizo (1998) - Madame Floria
- Cuarteto de La Habana (1999) - Nereida
- Las profecías de Amanda (1999) - Amanda
- Un paraíso bajo las estrellas (2000) - Mabel
- Nothing More (2001) - Cunda
- Rosa la China (2002) - Rita
- Solamente una vez (2002)
- @Festivbercine.ron (2004)
- 90 millas (2005) - Josefa
- Bienvenido/Welcome 2 (2006)
- Meteoro (2006) - Madame
- Mujeres en el Acto (2006)
- No Mercy (2008, TV Movie) - Irene
- The Condemned (2012) - Magdalena
- 7 Days in Havana (2012) - Delia (segment "El Yuma")
- Esther Somewhere (2013) - Maruja
- Forbidden Flights (2015) - Graciela
- Habana Selfies (2019)
