= Esther Somewhere =

Esther en alguna parte
- Theatrical release poster
- Directed by: Gerardo Chijona
- Written by: Eduardo Eimil
- Based on: Esther en alguna parte by Eliseo Alberto Diego
- Produced by: Francisco Adrianzén; Susana Molina; Isabel Prendes; Camilo Vives
- Starring: Reynaldo Miravalles; Enrique Molina
- Cinematography: Rafael Solís
- Edited by: Miriam Talavera
- Music by: José María Vitier
- Production companies: ICAIC; Sontrac E.I.R.L
- Release date: February 21, 2013
- Running time: 95 minutes
- Countries: Cuba; Peru
- Language: Spanish

Esther Somewhere (Spanish: Esther en alguna parte) is a 2013 comedy-drama film directed by Gerardo Chijona and written by Eduardo Eimil. Starring Reynaldo Miravalles and Enrique Molina, the film is based on the homonymous novel by Eliseo Alberto Diego. It premiered on February 21, 2013, in Cuban theaters.

== Cast ==
The actors participating in this film are:

- Reynaldo Miravalles as Lino Catalá
- Enrique Molina as Larry Po
- Daisy Granados as Maruja
- Eslinda Núñez as Elenita Ruiz
- Alicia Bustamante as Mercedes (Huesito)
- Verónica Lynn as Rosa Rosales
- Paula Ali as Julieta Cañizares
- Laura De la Uz as Ofelia
- Luis Alberto García as Lieutenant Chang
- Elsa Camp as Rafaela Tomey
- Héctor Medina as Ismael
- Danae Hernandez as Sofía
- Kevin Kovayashi as Totó

== Production ==
Principal photography for the film began on March 23, 2012 and ended on June 25 of the same year in Havana, Cuba.

== Awards ==
Year	Award	Category	Recipient	Result	Ref.
2014	Havana Film Festival New York	Best Actor	Reynaldo Miravalles	Won	
