= Wild Dogs (film) =

1985 film

- Directed by: Daniel Díaz Torres
- Written by: Norberto Fuentes
- Starring: Orlando Casín
- Cinematography: Pablo Martínez
- Release date: July 1985
- Running time: 90 minutes
- Country: Cuba
- Language: Spanish

Wild Dogs (Spanish: Jíbaro) is a 1985 Cuban drama film directed by Daniel Díaz Torres in his directorial debut. The Spanish language film was entered into the 14th Moscow International Film Festival.

== Cast ==
- Orlando Casín
- René de la Cruz
- Adolfo Llauradó
- Alejandro Lugo
- Raúl Pomares
- Adria Santana
- Ana Viña
- Salvador Wood
