= Verónica Lynn =

Cuban actress (born 1931)

- Born: Verónica Lynn López Martínez; May 7, 1931 (age 95); Pinar del Río, Cuba
- Occupation: Actor
- Years active: 1955–present
- Spouse: Pedro Álvarez

Verónica Lynn López Martínez (born May 7, 1931) is a Cuban Actor and theatre director with an extensive career in film, theatre, radio and television. She founded the theater group Trotamundos in 1989 with Pedro Álvarez, her husband.

== Career ==
Lynn's career began in the 1950s mainly in the theatre, acting in a large number of plays in the 1950s and 1960s. In 1971, she made her first appearance in Cuban cinema, in the film Una pelea cubana contra los demonios. In 1985, she played the leading role of Susana in Lejanía and four years later she appeared in Enrique Pineda Barnet's feature film La bella del Alhambra. Her character of Doña Teresa in the 1985 soap opera Sol de batey was well received in her country.

In the 1990s she made appearances in several feature films, including Mujer Transparente, Amores, Historias Clandestinas en La Habana and Turbulence. She continued to perform on stage, although mainly as a playwright and director of the group Trotamundos, with which she produced several plays. In the 2000s and 2010s she acted in feature films such as Las noches de Constantinopla, La anunciación, La pared de las palabras, Papa: Hemingway in Cuba and Sin alas, as well as participating in several short films. In 2017 she starred in the dramatic film Candelaria, directed by Colombian filmmaker Jhonny Hendrix Hinestroza. Her performance in the film earned her a nomination for the Macondo Awards in the category of best leading actress in 2019. The same year she received the Enrique Almirante Special Honorary Acting Award for her extensive career in dramatic arts.

== Filmography ==
=== Film ===
- 1972 – Una pelea cubana contra los demonios
- 1985 – Lejanía
- 1989 – La bella del Alhambra
- 1990 – Adriana (short)
- 1990 – Mujer transparente
- 1994 – Amores
- 1995 – Divas, por amor
- 1997 – Historias clandestinas en La Habana
- 1999 – Aire frío
- 2000 – Turbulence
- 2001 – Video de familia
- 2001 – Las noches de Constantinopla
- 2002 – Rosa la China
- 2003 – Paraíso extraviado (short)
- 2004 – ...En fin, el mar
- 2005 – California (short)
- 2007 – Canción para Rachel
- 2008 – La anunciación
- 2011 – Solo hay una (short)
- 2013 – Esther Somewhere
- 2014 – La pared de las palabras
- 2015 – Papa: Hemingway in Cuba
- 2015 – Sin alas
- 2016 – Aplausos (short)
- 2017 – 25 horas (short)
- 2017 – Candelaria
- 2018 – El regreso

=== TV ===
- 1985 – Sol de batey
- 1996 – Entre mamparas
