= Simulacro de incendio =

- Directed by: Gabriel Veyre
- Release date: February 7, 1897
- Running time: approx. 1 minute
- Countries: France; Cuba
- Language: Silent

Simulacro de incendio is an 1897 silent short documentary film created by French filmmaker Gabriel Veyre and released on February 7, 1897. It is recognized as the first film ever made in Cuba. It is considered lost.
