= Turbulence (2000 film) =

2000 film

- Theatrical release poster
- Directed by: Ruy Guerra
- Written by: Ruy Guerra
- Based on: Estorvo by Chico Buarque de Hollanda
- Produced by: Bruno Stropianna
- Starring: Jorge Perugorría
- Cinematography: Marcelo Durst
- Edited by: Mair Tavares
- Music by: Egberto Gismonti
- Production companies: Riofilme; Rioarte; Sky Light Cinema
- Distributed by: Riofilme
- Release date: May 2000
- Running time: 95 minutes
- Countries: Brazil; Cuba; Portugal
- Language: Portuguese

Turbulence (Portuguese: Estorvo) is a 2000 drama film directed by Ruy Guerra. A co-production between Brazil, Cuba, and Portugal, it was shot in Rio de Janeiro and Havana.

== Plot ==
A nameless man from a wealthy family lives in ruin, with no job and no clear direction in life. His sister believes he has turned his back on everything their family once represented, while his best friend—a member of a radical left-wing political movement—criticizes him for not having abandoned the family estate. The estate, meanwhile, has been taken over by squatters, who are eventually driven out by a gang of violent bikers. Convinced that someone is trying to kill him, he wanders through the city in a paranoid haze, fending off the advances of his sister's drug-addicted friend and searching for the skeleton of his ex-wife—who is far from pleased to see him.

== Cast ==
- Jorge Perugorría as I
- Bianca Byington as Sister
- Leonor Arocha as Ex-wife
- Tonico Oliveira as Brother-in-law
- Aurora Basnuevo as Indigenous woman
- Candido Damm as Crazy man
- Athayde Arcoverde as Red-haired man
- José Antônio Rodriguez as Old man
- Verónica Lynn as Mother
- Xando Graça as Sheriff
- Suzana Ribeiro as Sister's friend

== Reception ==
It was entered into the 2000 Cannes Film Festival. It won the Best Cinematography and Best Music awards at the 2000 Gramado Film Festival. At the Viña del Mar Film Festival it won the Best Cinematography Award, while Guerra was awarded the best director at the Festival de Cine Iberoamericano de Huelva.
