= Tundra (2021 film) =

2021 film directed by José Luis Aparicio

- Theatrical Poster
- Directed by: José Luis Aparicio
- Written by: Carlos Melián
- Produced by: Leila Montero; Daniela Muñoz; José Luis Aparicio; Gabriel Alemán
- Starring: Mario Guerra; Neisy Alpízar; Laura Molina; Jorge Molina; Jorge Enrique Caballero
- Cinematography: Gabriel Alemán
- Edited by: Joanna Montero
- Music by: Rafael Ramírez
- Release date: 2021
- Running time: 30 minutes
- Country: Cuba
- Language: Spanish

Tundra is a 2021 Cuban film directed by José Luis Aparicio. The film is about a lonely man dreaming of a mysterious woman who becomes his obsession. The film had its North American premiere at the 2022 Sundance Film Festival.

Tundra was partly crowdfunded through the Spanish platform Verkami and, according to the producers, it also received the support of the Cuban community in exile and some international cinephiles.

== Synopsis ==
Walfrido dreams of the Red Woman, whose image persists and becomes an obsession. Something tells him she is near. Over the course of a day, Walfrido will follow her trail as he travels through the suburbs of an infested city.

— Sundance Film Festival

== Cast ==
- Mario Guerra as Walfrido Larduet
- Neisy Alpízar as The Red Woman/Kirenia Natasha
- Laura Molina as Laurita García
- Jorge Molina as José José García
- Jorge Enrique Caballero as Amílcar, the philosophical inspector
