= Miguel Benavides =

Cuban actor

- Born: 10 September 1939; Mazanillo, Cuba
- Died: 14 July 2008 (aged 68); Mazanillo, Cuba
- Occupation: Actor
- Years active: 1964-2003

Miguel Benavides (10 September 1939 – 14 July 2008) was a Cuban actor. He appeared in more than twenty films between 1964 and 2003. He won the award for Best Actor at the 9th Moscow International Film Festival for his role in The Other Francisco.

== Filmography ==
Year	Title	Role	Notes
1964	Preludio 11	Peña	
1964	Un poco más de azul		(segment "Encuentro, El")
1964	La decisión		
1964	El encuentro		
1965	El robo		
1966	Zejscie do piekla		
1968	La odisea del General José		
1973	The Man from Maisinicu		
1974	The Other Francisco	Francisco	
1975	Ustedes tienen la palabra		
1976	Un día de noviembre		
1979	Portrait of Teresa		
1982	Cecilia		
1984	Habanera	Doctor	
1985	¡Patakín! quiere decir ¡fábula!	Shango Valdes	
1986	Plácido		
2003	Habanece		
