= Paraíso (2003 film) =

2003 film directed by Alina Teodorescu

- Directed by: Alina Teodorescu
- Starring: Yasel Gonzalez Rivera
- Music by: Madera Limpia
- Release date: 2003
- Running time: 92 minutes
- Countries: Cuba; Germany
- Language: Spanish

Paraíso ("Paradise") is a 2003 Cuban/German film. It was directed by Alina Teodorescu.

== Synopsis ==
Using a half road-movie, half documentary style, the film presents work and life of a Cuban band living in Guantanamo, Cuba. The film contains many music clips with well-done subtitles, as well as rehearsal work or live acts. In interview parts the musicians also explain how they develop their song concepts out of difficulties of daily life.

== Cast ==
- Yasel González Rivera
- Gerald Thomas Collymore
- Rafael Ocaña Creagh
- Angel Rubio Espinoza
- Yoannis Méndez Centeno

== Musicians ==
Madera Limpia developed a unique mixture of hip hop / Rap lyrics accompanied by afro-Cuban rhythms and traditional music (e.g. Changui). This blend is often referred to as Latin Alternative or Rap Cubano. The band name ('clean wood') refers to driftwood used as very basic musical instruments.

They sing about youth with no real chances (Verdad Global), love affairs (e.g. Punto de Partida or Descarga Fula, which is about a girlfriend going away with a tourist), or growing crime and unsocial behaviour in their neighborhood (Sueño Canino - A dog's dream).

The band presented their music on a tour to Europe in 2005. After their first CD (Paraíso OST) they recorded one more international CD. In Cuba there are also several 'unofficial' or bootleg recordings circulating on the streets, containing more open lyrics than is possible in an official production. German Der Spiegel called their lyrics 'Widerstandspoesie' (resistance poetry).

== Awards ==
The film gained several worldwide awards, mainly on Latin-American festivals, e.g.

- 2004 German Cinematography Award - Editing Award Nomination
- 2004 Premio independiente.doc - Asociacion de la Prensa de Cadiz
- 2005 AluCine Toronto - Best Non-Latino documentary
