= Laura de la Uz =

Cuban actress

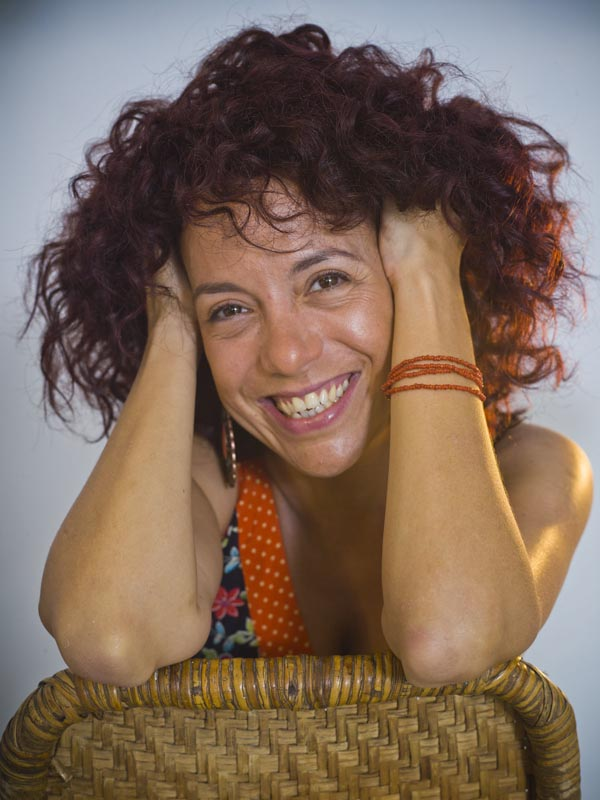
- Born: 14 February 1970 (age 55); Havana, Cuba
- Occupation: Actress
- Years active: 1990–present

Laura de la Uz ([ˈlawɾa ðe la ˈus]; born 14 February 1970) is a Cuban film, television and theatre actress. She appeared in the theatre drama "Un Rayo de Esperanza" in 2020 Cubacultura. She was nominated for Platino Award for Best Actress twice.

== Career ==
Laura de la Uz graduated from the National School of Theater Instructors of Havana in 1992 (specializing in acting, directing and pedagogy). While still a student, in 1990, she starred in the film Hello Hemingway directed by Fernando Pérez, for which she won the Coral Award for the best female performance at the XII International Festival of New Latin American Cinema. She performed in Cuban theater productions such as "Electra Garrigó" or "La Boda" and in serials such as "Blanco y Negro ¡No!" And "Oh, La Habana!". In 2000 she graduated as an international comedian from the International School of Gesture and Image "La Mancha" in Santiago de Chile. In 2001 she directed the play "Mentita's bar" with the theater company "La Sombra", from Santiago de Chile. In 2014 she wrote and directed the play "Laura de la Uz's Reality Show", performed in three sessions at the Mella Theater in Havana in October and December 2014. She won the Coral Award for Best Actress at the Havana Film Festival twice. She also had two nominations for Best Actress at the Film Platino Awards.

== Filmography ==
=== Films ===
- Hello Hemingway (1990) Dir. Fernando Pérez
- Ellos también comieron chocolate suizo (cortometraje, 1991) Dir. Manuel Marcel
- Una pistola de verdad (cortometraje, 1992) Dir. Eduardo de la Torre
- Historia de un amor adolescente (cortometraje, 1992) Dir. Juanita Medina
- Madagascar (1993) Dir. Fernando Pérez
- Amores (1994) Dir. José Sanjurjo
- La muerte (cortometraje, 1994). Dir. Gabriela Valentá
- Historias clandestinas de La Habana (1996) Dir. Diego Musik
- Siberia (2006) Dir. Renata Duque
- Divina desmesura (El Benny) (2006) Dir. Jorge Luis Sánchez
- Homo sapiens (cortometraje, 2006) Dir. Eduardo del Llano
- Liberia (cortometraje, 2007) Dir. Renata Duque
- El cuerno de la abundancia (2008) Dir. Juan Carlos Tabío
- La Habana, isla de la belleza (2008), de Nelson Navarro
- Los minutos, las horas (cortometraje, 2009) Dir. Janaina Marques
- Boleto al Paraíso (2009) Dir. Gerardo Chijona
- Aché (cortometraje, 2010) Dir. Eduardo del Llano
- Acorazado (2010) Dir. Álvaro Curiel
- Extravíos (2011) Dir. Alejandro Gil
- Y, sin embargo… (2012) Dir. Rudy Mora
- Amor crónico (2012) Dir. Jorge Perugorría
- Siete días en La Habana (2012) Dir. Benicio del Toro
- La película de Ana (2012) Dir Daniel Díaz-Torres
- Esther en alguna parte (2012) Dir. Gerardo Chijona
- Vestido de novia (2014) Dir Marylin Solaya
- Una historia con Cristo y Jesús, (cortometraje, 2014) Dir. Oldren Romero
- La pared de las palabras (2014) Dir. Fernando Pérez
- Espejuelos oscuros (2015) Dir Jessica Rodríguez
- Yuli (2018) Dir Iciar Bollain

=== Television ===
- El naranjo del patio (1991) Dir. Xiomara Blanco
- La amada móvil (1992) Dir. Camilo Hernández.
- Konrad (1992) Dir. José Luis Yánez
- Pocholo y su pandilla (1992) Dir. Charlie Medina
- Blanco y Negro ¡No! (1993) Dir. Charlie Medina
- A lo mejor para el año que viene (teleserie, 1996) Dir. Héctor Quintero
- Punto G (2004) Dir. Miguel Brito
- Oh! La Habana (teleserie, 2006–2007) Dir. Charlie Medina
- En el corredor de la muerte (teleserie, 2019) Dir. Carlos Marqués-Marcet

=== Theatre ===
- Mascarada Casal (1993) Dir. Armando Suárez Del Villar
- El Rey no ha muerto (1995) Dir. Allen Euclides.
- La boda (1997) Dir. Raúl Martín. Teatro de la Luna (Cuba)
- Mentita´s bar (2001). Dir. Laura de la Uz. Compañía La Sombra (Chile)
- Electra Garrigó (2006-2007) Dir. Raúl Martín. Teatro de la Luna (Cuba)
- Delirio habanero (2006-2012) Dir. Raúl Martín. Teatro de la Luna (Cuba)
- Heaven (2008-2011) Dir. Raúl Martín. Teatro de la Luna (Cuba)
- La Dama del Mar (2012) Dir. Raúl Martín. Teatro de la Luna (Cuba)
- El Reality Show de Laura de la Uz (2014) Dir. Laura de la Uz/Raúl Martín. Teatro Mella (Cuba)
- Cómo ser una estrella en Cuba y no morir en el intento (2014) Dir. Laura de la Uz (España/Cuba)
- Un Rayo Esperanza (2020)
