= Gerardo Chijona =

Cuban film director and critic

Gerardo Chijona Valdés (born in Havana on 1949) is a Cuban film director and critic. Among his best known work is the 2011 film Ticket to Paradise. Other films he is known for include Adorable Lies, Esther Somewhere, Un paraíso bajo las estrellas, and Perfecto amor equivocado. He initially directed documentary films.
