= Eslinda Núñez =

Cuban actress

Eslinda Núñez (born 27 December 1943 in Santa Clara, Cuba) is a Cuban film and television actress.

She was born in the city of Santa Clara, 280 km from the capital Havana, to Celia (housewife) and Ciro (bus driver). She loves Santa Clara for its "wonderful people" and says of her mother: "Mom was an extraordinary woman to me. A woman who was uneducated, but with fantastic natural intelligence. She helped me a lot in life."

== Selected filmography ==
- 1963: El Otro Cristóbal
- 1968: Lucía
- 1968: Memories of Underdevelopment
- 1971: Un día de noviembre
- 1975: Mina, Wind of Freedom
- 1982: Cecilia
- 2010: Juan of the Dead

== Awards ==
- «Distinción por la cultura nacional», granted by the Council of State of Cuba.
- 1992: Guest of honor at the Bogotá Film Festival (Colombia) on the occasion of the 500th anniversary of the invasion of America by the Spanish.
- Guest of honor of the city of Nantes (France).
- Medal on the occasion of the 300th anniversary of the founding of Santa Clara.
- 2001: Lifetime achievement award at the Havana Film Festival.
- Lifetime Achievement Award from the National Union of Writers and Artists of Cuba.
- Acting prize at the Huelva Ibero-American Film Festival (Spain).
- Prize in the acting competition of the National Union of Writers and Artists of Cuba.
- Honorable mention at the acting competition of the National Union of Writers and Artists of Cuba.
- 2011: Premio Nacional de Cine (Cuba)
