= Eduardo del Llano =

Cuban film producer and writer

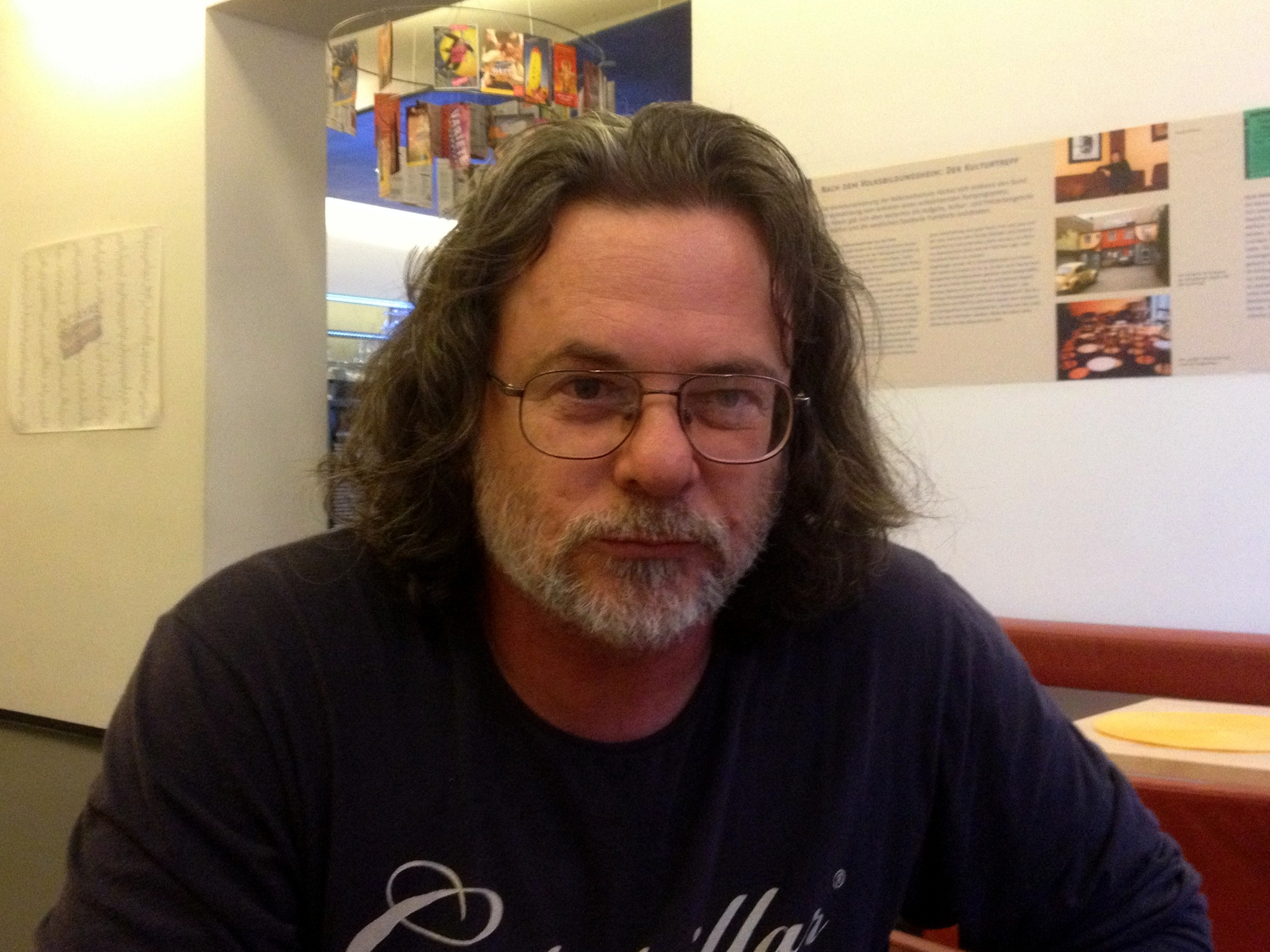
- Eduardo del Llano (2013)
- Born: 9 October 1962 (age 63); Moscow, USSR
- Education: University of Havana

Eduardo del Llano Rodriguez (born 9 October 1962 in Moscow) is a Cuban writer, university professor, film director, producer and screenwriter.

Del Llano graduated with an Art History degree from the University of Havana in 1985. In 1982 he founded the comedy theatre and literary quartet NOS-Y-OTROS that existed until 1997. From 1990 to 1995 he taught History of Latin American art and History of Photography at the Faculty of Arts and Letters at the University of Havana.

He created the short film Monte Rouge.
