= Ticket to Paradise (2011 film) =

2011 film

- Film poster
- Spanish: Boleto al paraíso
- Directed by: Gerardo Chijona
- Written by: Francisco García; Gerardo Chijona; Maykel Rodríguez
- Produced by: Camilo Vives; Antonio Hens; José Antonio Varela
- Starring: Miriel Cejas; Héctor Medina; Luis Alberto García; Jorge Perugorría
- Cinematography: Raúl Pérez Ureta
- Edited by: Miriam Talavera
- Music by: Edesio Alejandro
- Production companies: ICAIC; Malas Compañías PC
- Release dates: January 2011 (Sundance); 28 October 2011 (Spain)
- Running time: 88 minutes
- Countries: Cuba; Spain; Venezuela
- Language: Spanish

Ticket to Paradise (Spanish: Boleto al paraíso) is a 2011 drama film written and directed by Gerardo Chijona. The film won the Havana Star Prize for Best Film (Fiction) at the 12th annual Havana Film Festival New York.

== Plot ==
The plot is set in Cuba around 1993, tracking the struggles of neglected young people amid the economic hardships of the Special Period.

== Cast ==
- Miriel Cejas as Eunice
- Héctor Medina as Alejandro
- Luis Alberto García as Armando
- Jorge Perugorría as Rensoli

== Production ==
The film is a Cuban-Spanish-Venezuelan co-production by ICAIC and Malas Compañías PC in association with Loasur Audiovisual and 12 Gatos.

== Release ==
The film was presented at the 2011 Sundance Film Festival in January 2011. It also screened at the 14th Málaga Film Festival in March 2011.

== Reception ==
John Anderson of Variety deemed the film to be "memorable, honest and unforgettable drama".

Justin Lowe of The Hollywood Reporter assessed that the film "never quite gels despite absorbing storyline".

== See also ==
- List of Cuban films
- List of Spanish films of 2011
