= Yuliet Cruz =

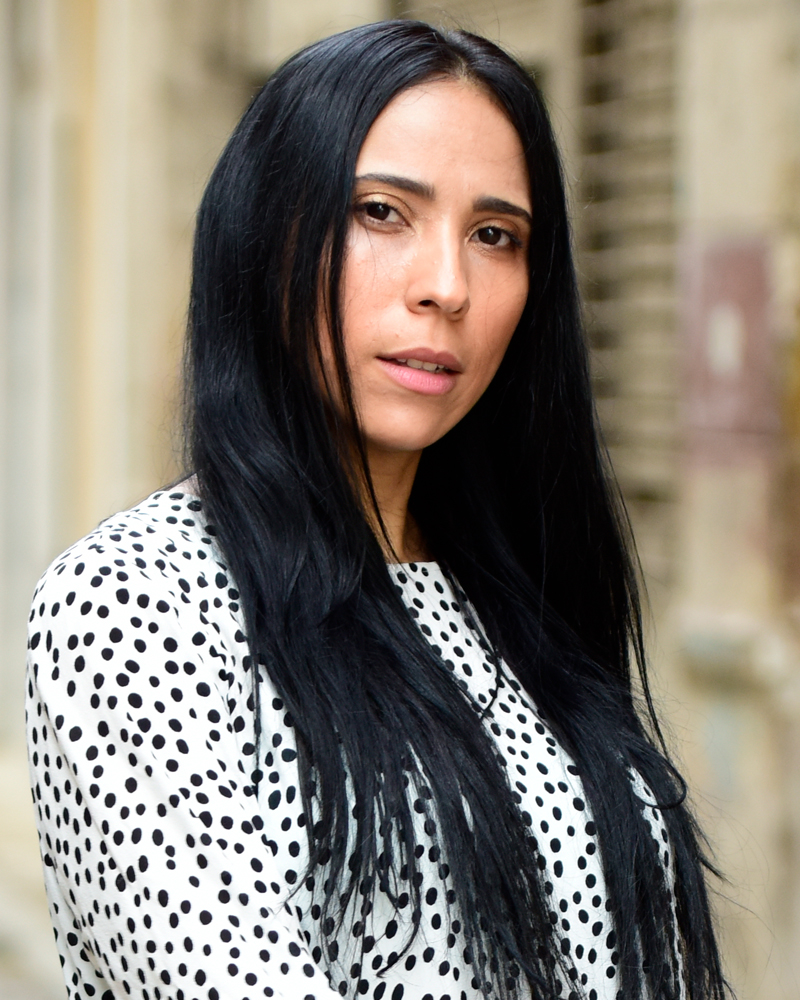
- Yuliet Cruz in 2020
- Born: Yuliet Cruz Delgado; 1 October 1980 (age 46); Havana, Cuba
- Education: Instituto Superior de Arte
- Occupations: Actress; television host
- Years active: 1998–present
- Spouse: Leoni Torres (m. 2008)
- Children: 2
- Website: www.yulietcruz.com

Yuliet Cruz Delgado (born 1 October 1980) is a Cuban actress and television host. Known for her work across various film and television productions, she has starred in films such as Behavior (2014), La película de Ana (2012), Melaza (2012) and Habana Eva (2010). She has also participated in theatrical productions such as Aire frío, Fíchenla si pueden and Talco, under the direction of Carlos Celdrán at Argos Teatro.

Graduated from the Instituto Superior de Arte (ISA), she is the recipient of numerous accolades, including the ACE Critics Award from the New York Latino Film Festival for Best Supporting Actress for La Película de Ana in 2014 and the Award for Best Female Performance in Theater for the play Mecánica in 2015.

== Career ==
Cruz stated that from an early age she had an inclination for art, although her qualities were not evident. She began to make her way in the world of art, graduating with a specialty in Acting in the class of 2006 from the Higher Institute of Art, despite the fact that her family wanted her to study Medicine or Economics.

Cruz made her debut in 1998, playing Lalita, in the play Contigo Pan y Cebolla by Héctor Quintero. About that she said:

It was the character with which I debuted in professional theater and on television. Thanks to that character I met Héctor Quintero and learned a lot. I worked with excellent actors as a teenager, that shaped me.

This theatrical piece was taken to television and became Cruz's first appearance on television, which, despite not being her priority, has been a part of her career. On television, she has appeared mainly as a presenter in musical programs such as Piso 6 and the contest for the search for new talents called La Banda Gigante produced by the RTV Comercial company of the Cuban Institute of Radio and Television (ICRT) in 2019. In addition, she has worked in dramatized programs such as Helado Tropical, Mi Caballero de París, Leyendas de sal, Apuntaladas and Karma. Film and theater capture her attention, as she has confessed, she loves them in that order, which is why she has dedicated most of her professional life to working on projects in these media.

I do not leave the theater. It is a creative space, a school. In this profession you cannot stop growing. Visions change a lot and a style of acting and staging is moving in the world to which we must approach. You have to try to be active all the time, and the theater allows me to. I love cinema because it remains, and when you go to record a scene you know that it is the only opportunity you have to leave everything there.

After her debut, she sporadically dabbled in the theater until in 2008 she joined the Argos Teatro company directed by the playwright and educator Carlos Celdrán, winner of the 2016 National Theater Award. Since then she has starred in plays such as Aire frío for which she received the Adria Santana Honorary Award for her portrayal of Luz Marina Romaguera and Fíchenla si pueden, Carlos Celdrán's own version of the original play The Respectful Prostitute authored by Jean-Paul Sartre. With this stage performance she received an acting award in 2014. As she stated:

Luz Marina Romaguera is another of my beloved characters and to whom I owe a lot. Cuba has great writers and intellectuals and Virgilio is one of the greats. It is immense. Aire frío is a classic of Cuban theater because of the truthful and bitter portrait it makes of society and the family, told through the Romagueras. Luz Marina, its protagonist, manages to charm the viewer with her hard language, her grace, sacrifice and love for the family, especially her brother Oscar. Virgilio created an extraordinary work. Luz Marina is a key character in my career.

Similarly, another of Cruz's jobs was to play Nara Telmer in the play Mechanics with actor Carlos Luis González, an adaptation by playwright Abel González Melo based on the text A Doll's House by Henrik Ibsen. El tío Vania (2014), Talco (2010) and Ábalon, una noche en Bangkok (2008) are other productions that she has starred in.

Cruz has opted for the cinema and currently she accumulates several works on the big screen. She gave life to characters such as Sonia in the film Behavior (2014) and the role of Miriam in Esteban (2016), characterized by the acceptance of both the public and specialized critics.

Other films in which Cruz has acted throughout her career have been Sergio y Sergéi (2017), Se Vende (2012), Melaza (2012), Habana Eva (2010), Habana Blues (2005) and La película de Ana (2012) for which she won the ACE Critics Award from the New York Latino Film Festival for Best Supporting Actress.

In 2021 she moved to Miami where she has participated in the film Plantadas (2023) and Adiós Cuba (2025).

== Personal life ==
Yuliet Cruz has been married to the Cuban singer-songwriter Leoni Torres since 2008, as a result of their relationship they have two children, Sebastian and Samuel.
