= Sergio Corrieri =

Cuban actor and cultural administrator (1938–2008)

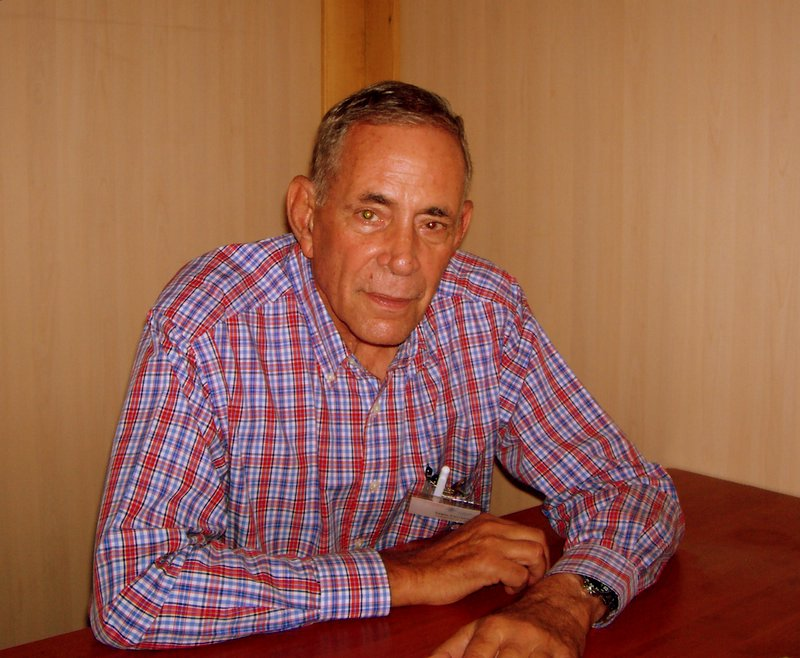
- Born: 2 March 1938; Havana, Cuba
- Died: 29 February 2008 (aged 69); Havana, Cuba
- Occupations: Actor, cultural administrator
- Years active: 1962–1987

Sergio Corrieri (2 March 1938 – 29 February 2008) was a Cuban actor and cultural administrator. One of the leading figures of post-revolutionary Cuban cinema, he became internationally known for his performances in Memories of Underdevelopment (1968) and The Man from Maisinicu (1973), the latter earning him the award for Best Actor at the 8th Moscow International Film Festival. Beyond his acting career, Corrieri played a significant role in Cuban cultural and political life. He was closely associated with the Cuban Institute of Cinematographic Art and Industry (ICAIC) from its founding in 1959 and later held high-ranking positions within the Communist Party of Cuba and the Cuban government.

== Early life and career ==
Corrieri was born in Havana on 2 March 1938. He began his artistic career in the early years following the Cuban Revolution and quickly became part of the generation of actors who shaped the emerging national cinema under ICAIC. Founded in 1959, ICAIC became the principal institution for film production in Cuba, and Corrieri was centrally involved in many of its most important early productions. He gained early recognition for his role in I Am Cuba (1964), directed by Mikhail Kalatozov, a Soviet–Cuban co-production that later achieved cult status internationally. In 1968 he delivered one of his most celebrated performances as Sergio Carmona Mendoyo in Memories of Underdevelopment, directed by Tomás Gutiérrez Alea. The film is widely regarded as a landmark of Latin American cinema and a defining work of Cuban revolutionary filmmaking. In 1973 Corrieri starred in The Man from Maisinicu, directed by Manuel Pérez Paredes. His performance earned him the Best Actor award at the 8th Moscow International Film Festival, consolidating his reputation beyond Cuba. Throughout the 1970s and 1980s, Corrieri appeared in historical and politically themed films such as Mina, Wind of Freedom (1977), Río Negro (1977), and Baragua (1985). His final film role was in Como la vida misma (1987), after which he gradually shifted his focus toward cultural administration and political responsibilities.

== Political and cultural activity ==
Corrieri was deeply involved in Cuba’s political institutions. He became a member of the Central Committee of the Communist Party of Cuba in 1980 and was appointed head of culture within the Central Committee in 1987. From 1976 onward, he served as a deputy to the National Assembly of People's Power, Cuba’s legislative body. Between 1998 and 2003 he was also a member of the Council of State, one of the country’s highest governing bodies. From 1990 until his death, Corrieri served as president of the Cuban Institute of Friendship with the Peoples (ICAP), an organization dedicated to fostering international solidarity with Cuba. In this role, he represented Cuba in numerous international cultural and political forums.

== Death ==
Sergio Corrieri died in Havana on 29 February 2008, two days before his 70th birthday. His death was widely reported in Cuban media, which highlighted both his artistic legacy and his decades of service to the Cuban state.

== Filmography ==
Year	Title	Role	Notes
1964	I Am Cuba	Alberto	
1965	Cuba '58		(segment "Novios, Los")
1965	Desarraigo		
1966	Papeles son papeles		
1968	Memories of Underdevelopment	Sergio Carmona Mendoyo	
1968	La ausencia		
1973	The Man from Maisinicu		
1977	Mina, Wind of Freedom		
1977	Río Negro		Documentary
1977	Mella		
1985	Baragua		
1987	Como la vida misma		(final film role)

== Awards ==
Best Actor, 8th Moscow International Film Festival (1973) – The Man from Maisinicu
