= The Renegade (1951 film) =

1951 film

- Directed by: Ramón Peón
- Starring: Rita Montaner
- Cinematography: Enrique Bravo
- Release date: 1951
- Country: Cuba
- Language: Spanish

The Renegade (Spanish: La renegada) is a 1951 Cuban drama film directed by Ramón Peón and starring Rita Montaner. It is a melodrama, influenced by the success of similar Mexican films of the era.

== Cast ==
- Gina Cabrera
- Alberto González Rubio]
- Yadira Jiménez
- Rita Montaner
- Enrique Santisteban

== Bibliography ==
- Antoni Kapcia. Havana: The Making of Cuban Culture. Bloomsbury Academic, 2005.
