= Eduardo Manet =

Cuban novelist and playwright (born 1930)

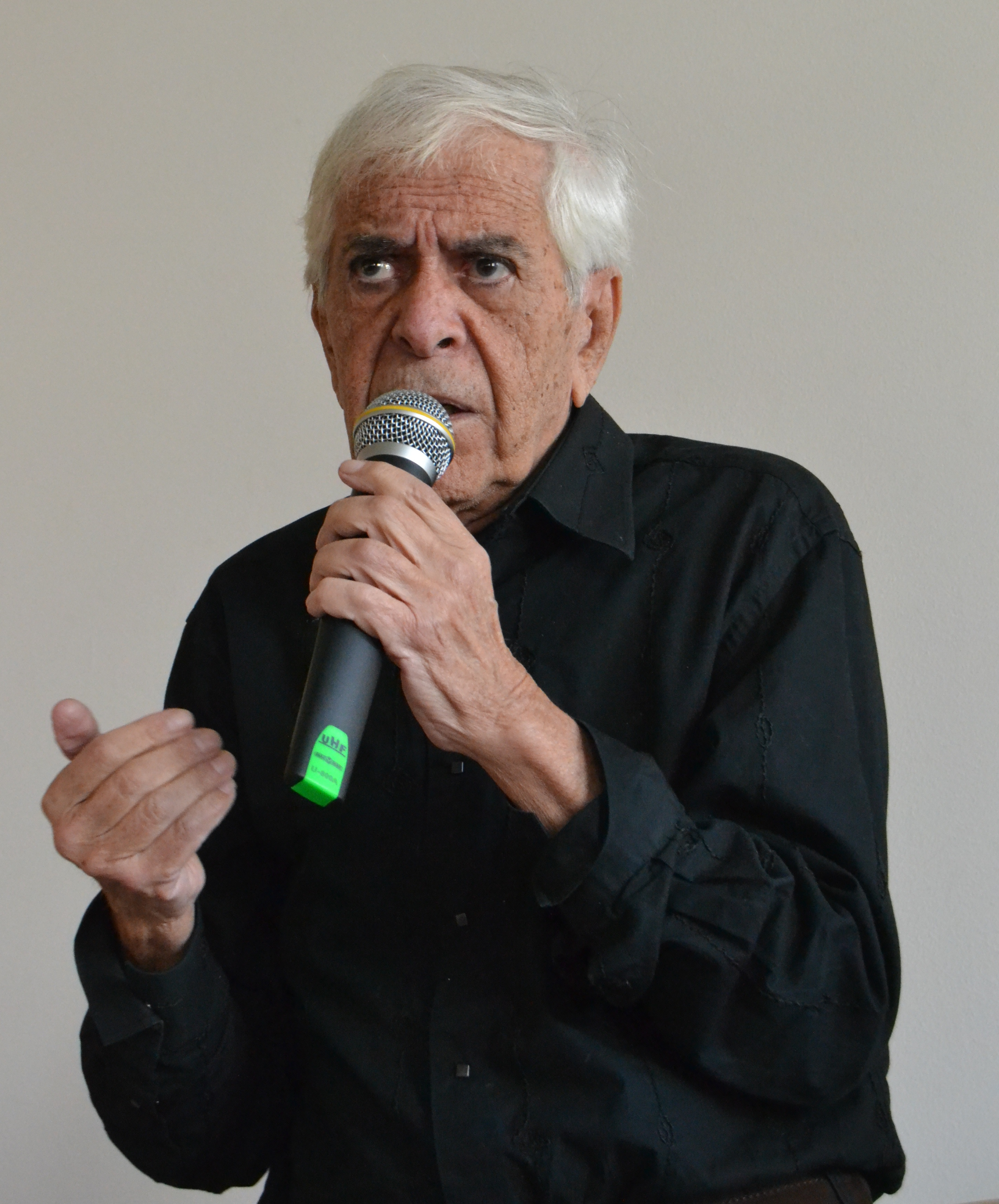
Eduardo Manet at the E. Belin institute in Vesoul

Eduardo Manet (born 19 June 1930) is a Cuban-born novelist and playwright writing in French. His work has been translated into over 20 languages.

== Life ==
Born in Santiago de Cuba, Manet lived in Paris and Italy in the 1950s. In 1960 he returned to Cuba, becoming director of the National Dramatic Ensemble at the National Theater of Cuba. After Fidel Castro supported the Soviet invasion of Czechoslovakia in 1968, Manet returned to Paris, where he has lived subsequently.

== Works ==
- Les Nonnes, 1969, translated by Robert Baldick as The Nuns, 1970
- Eux; ou, La prise du pouvoir, 1971.
- L'île du lézard vert: roman, 1992.
- Rhapsodie cubaine: roman, 1996.
- D'amour et d'exil: roman, 1999.
- La sagesse du singe: roman, 2001.
- Maestro!: roman, 2002.
- Mes années Cuba, 2004.
- Ma vie de Jésus: roman, 2005.
