= Sergio Giral =

Cuban-American film writer and director (1937–2024)

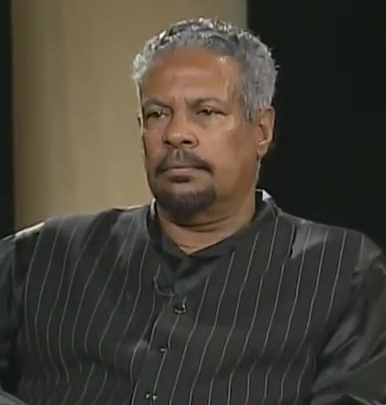
- Giral on CUNY TV's Charlando con Cervantes, 1998
- Born: 2 January 1937; Havana, Cuba
- Died: 12 March 2024 (aged 87); Bay Harbor Island, U.S.
- Occupation: Film director
- Known for: The Other Francisco

Sergio Giral (2 January 1937 – 12 March 2024) was a Cuban-American film writer and director. He was born in Cuba to parents Antonio and Plácida, and raised in New York City, as an aspiring young painter in the days of the Beatnik generation.

In 1962, Oscar-winning cinematographer Néstor Almendros invited Giral to work together at the ICAIC (The Cuban Film Institute). It was there, after a series of shorts and documentaries, that Giral filmed a trilogy (The Other Francisco, Rancheador and Maluala) about slavery in 19th Century Cuba and the Caribbean. The Other Francisco was entered into the 9th Moscow International Film Festival where it won a Diploma.

In 1991 Giral returned to the United States. He resided in Miami. Dos veces Ana was his first feature film made in USA. Giral died on 12 March 2024, at the age of 87.

== Filmography ==
Year	English title	Original title (if different)
1967	Cimarrón	
1968	Gonzalo Roig	
1973	Qué bueno canta usted	
1975	The Other Francisco	El otro Francisco
1975	Rancheador	The Slave Hunter
1979	Maluala	
1981	Glass Roof	Techo de vidrio
1986	Plácido	
1991	María Antonia	
1995	The Broken Image	La imagen rota
2000	Chronicle of an ordinance	
2004	Al barbaro del ritmo	
2010	Dos Veces Ana	

== See also ==
- Cinema of Cuba
