= Pastor Vega =

Cuban film director (1940–2005)

- Born: 12 February 1940; Havana, Cuba
- Died: 2 June 2005 (aged 65); Havana, Cuba
- Occupations: Film director, screenwriter
- Years active: 1964-2003

Pastor Vega (12 February 1940 – 2 June 2005) was a Cuban film director and screenwriter. He directed nine films between 1964 and 2003. His 1979 drama film Portrait of Teresa was entered into the 11th Moscow International Film Festival.

== Selected filmography ==
- Portrait of Teresa (1979)
