= Enrique Molina (actor) =

Cuban film and television actor (1945–2021)

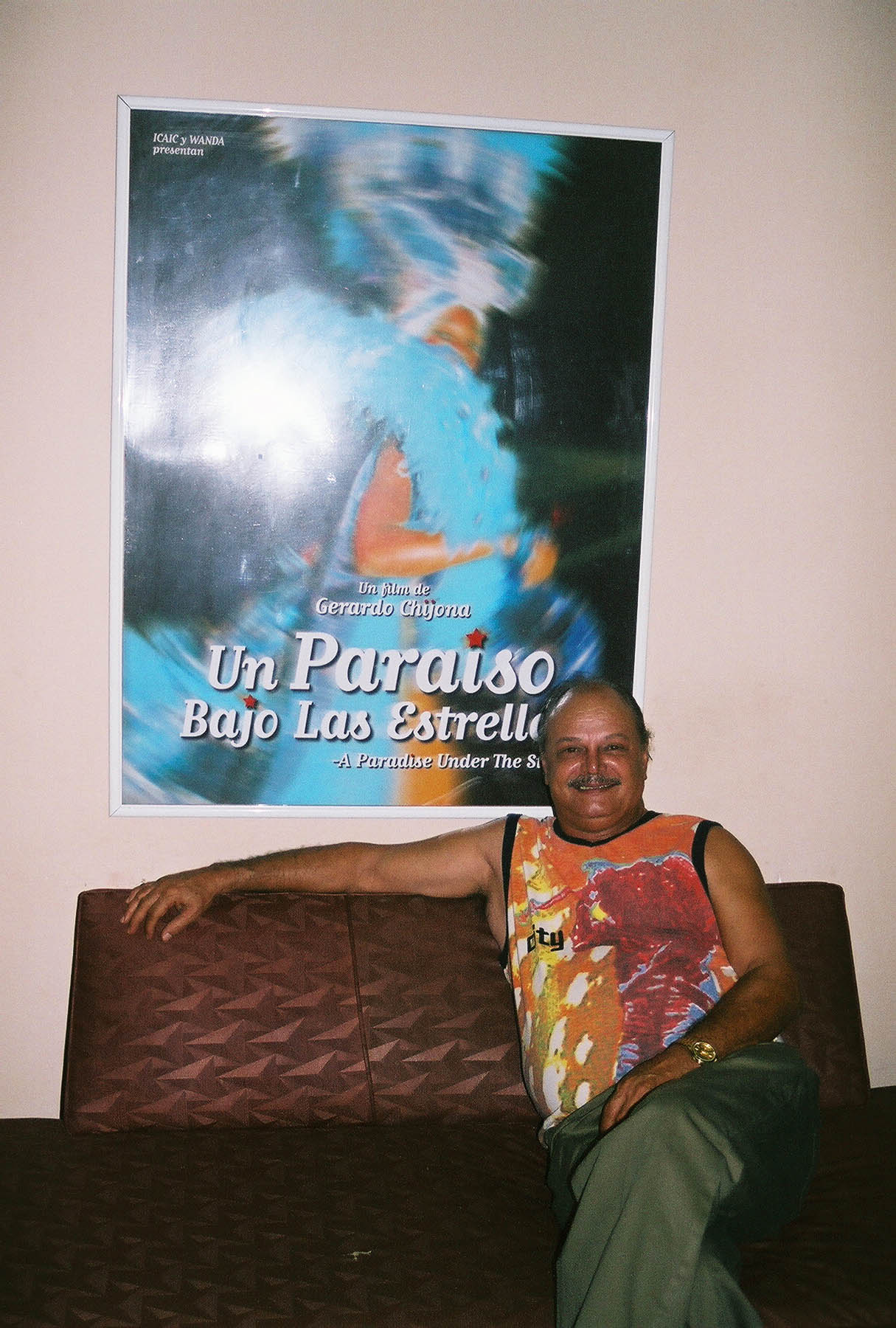
- Molina in 2005
- Born: 31 October 1943; Santiago de Cuba, Republic of Cuba
- Died: 3 September 2021 (aged 77); Havana, Cuba
- Occupation: Actor
- Spouse: Familia Pareja Marta Mestre (primer matrimonio) Elsa Ruiz (segundo matrimonio

Enrique Molina (31 October 1943 – 3 September 2021) was a Cuban film and television actor.

Molina died from COVID-19 in 2021, during the COVID-19 pandemic in Cuba.

== Career ==
Molina was born in Santiago de Cuba. In 1968, he joined the Conjunto Dramático de Oriente theatrical company. In 1968, he began to work in television, appearing on Tele-Rebelde until 1970 when he moved to Havana. He had performed theatre, appeared on Cuban radio and television programmes, and in films. He was often described as a character actor.

== Partial filmography ==
- El hombre de Maisinicú (1973)
- Polvo Rojo (1981)
- La segunda hora de Esteban Zayas (1984)
- Jíbaro (1984)
- Una novia para David (1985) - Taxi driver
- En tres y dos (1985)
- Hello, Hemingway (1990) - Manolo
- Alicia en el pueblo de Maravillas (1991)
- Caravana (1992)
- Derecho de Asilo (1993)
- Kleines Tropicana (1997)
- Un paraíso bajo las estrellas (1999) - Candido
- Hacerse el sueco (2001) - Amancio
- ¿Quién eres tú? (2001, Short) - Hombre
- Video de Familia (2001)
- Concurso (2002, Short) - Da Rosa
- ¿La vida en rosa? (2004)
- La Revelación (2004, Short)
- 90 millas (2005) - Rolando
- Barrio Cuba (2005)
- El Último vagón (2006, Short) - Jefe de estación
- El Benny (2006) - Olimpio
- Páginas del diario de Mauricio (2005)
- Mañana (2007)
- El Cuerno de la abundancia (2008) - Bernardo
- Lisanka (2009) - Máximo
- Acorazado (2010) - Alberto
- Club Habana (2010) - Manolo
- Amor crónico (2010)
- Day of the Flowers (2012) - Jorge
- Esther Somewhere (2013) - Larry Po
- Contigo pan y cebolla (2014) - Anselmo
- The Human Thing (2016)
- Four Seasons in Havana (2016) - Antonio Rangel
- Los buenos demonios (2018) - Molina

== See also ==
- Cinema of Cuba
- Media of Cuba
