= Adria Santana =

Cuban actress (1948–2011)

- Born: 29 August 1948; Las Tunas, Cuba
- Died: 30 September 2011 (aged 63); Havana, Cuba
- Education: Instituto Superior de Arte
- Occupation: Actress
- Awards: Latin ACE Award (1997)

Adria Santana (29 August 1948 – 30 September 2011) was a Cuban actress best known for her work in the theater.

== Biography ==
Trained at the National School of Art, Adria Santana soon joined Havana's Teatro Estudio company, where she remained for twenty years. She worked with the directors Héctor Quintero, Armando Suárez del Villar, Berta Martínez, Carlos Díaz, and Jorge Alí Triana. Her best-known roles were Medea, Bernarda in The House of Bernarda Alba, Lalita in Contigo, pan y cebolla, Camila in Santa Camila de La Habana Vieja, the Cuban play Vagos rumores (in which Santana considered that she "developed as an actress"), and especially, her work with Abelardo Estorino. He directed her theatrical debut as Belisa in La discreta enamorada by Lope de Vega, and she came to be considered his "fetish" actress. On the occasion of her death, Estorino said:

We were used to working together. I trusted her a lot as an actress and as a person. Where she was, everything was guaranteed by her subtlety, her sensitivity, and her intelligence. I do not know if I can continue doing theater without Adria.

In the cinema she worked, among others, on the films Polvo Rojo (1982), Wild Dogs (1985), Isla Negra (1995), and Casa Vieja (2010).

She worked at the Teatro Repertorio Español in New York, where she won a Latin ACE Award (1997) and the Best Actress award of the International Monologue Festival of Miami (2001). Among her distinctions in Cuba were the Omar Valdés Award from the National Union of Writers and Artists and the Alejo Carpentier Medal from the Council of State. Adria Santana died to cancer in 2011 at age 63.
