= Daniel Díaz Torres =

Cuban film director

- Born: 31 December 1948; Havana, Cuba
- Died: 16 September 2013 (aged 64); Havana, Cuba
- Occupations: Film director, screenwriter
- Years active: 1975-present

Daniel Díaz Torres (31 December 1948 – 16 September 2013) was a Cuban film director and screenwriter. His 1985 film Wild Dogs was entered into the 14th Moscow International Film Festival.

== Selected filmography ==
- Wild Dogs (1985)
- Alice in Wondertown (1991)
