= Rolando Díaz =

Cuban film director and writer

Rolando Díaz is a Cuban filmmaker who has written and directed both documentary and feature films. He has directed approximately 19 documentary films. In 1984, he made his first feature film, the comedy Los pájaros tirándole a la escopeta ("Birds Swinging a Shotgun"). The film garnered several Cuban and international awards. Cuba's Audiovisual Encyclopedia describes it as one of the most popular films in the history of Cuban filmmaking. Many of his later films, despite achieving international success, were allowed limited screenings in Cuba until the 2010s.

Since 1994, he has resided on Tenerife, Canary Islands, Spain. He gave a video interview to Cuban journalist Wendy Lazacano.

== Filmography ==
- La respuesta del pueblo (1976), short documentary
- En el tiempo preciso (1977), short documentary
- Festival Nacional de la Juventud y los Estudiantes (1977), short documentary
- Momentos del Cardín (1977), short documentary
- Medellín min78 (1978), short documentary
- 45 días (1978), short documentary
- 1979: Encuentro en Cozumel, short documentary
- 1979: Redonda y viene en caja cuadrada, short documentary
- 1979: Panamá quererte, short documentary
- 1980: Quincho Barrilete, short documentary
- 1981: Controversia, short documentary
- 1981: No van lejos los de alante... si los de atrás corren bien, short documentary
- 1981: Tu gigantesco paso de millones, short documentary
- 1982: Del uno al diez, short documentary
- 1982: Para gusto se han hecho los colores, documentary short
- 1984: Los pájaros tirándole a la escopeta
- 1985: En tres y dos
- 1987: Emilio Varela vs. Camelia la Texana, documentary
- 1989: La vida en rosa
- 1993: El largo viaje de Rústico, documentary
- 1995: Melodrama
- If You Only Understood (Si me comprendieras) (1998)
- Closeness (Cercanía) (2004)
- 2007: La vida según Ofelia with Saida Santana and Carlos Cruz
- 2007: Actrices, actores, exilio (documentary)
- 2010: Puzzle
- 2013: Los caminos de Aissa (docudrama)
- Dossier of the Absences or The Lost Children "Dossier de ausencias” República Dominicana, docudrama (2021)
- Una elefanta sobre la tela de una araña (2022)
