= Lucía =

- Directed by: Humberto Solás
- Written by: Humberto Solás; Julio García Espinosa; Nelson Rodríguez
- Produced by: Raúl Canosa; Camilo Vives
- Starring: Raquel Revuelta; Eslinda Núñez; Adela Legrá; Teté Vergara; Idalia Anreus
- Cinematography: Jorge Herrera
- Edited by: Nelson Rodríguez
- Music by: Leo Brouwer
- Distributed by: Instituto Cubano del Arte e Industrias Cinematográficos (ICAIC)
- Release date: October 1968
- Running time: 160 minutes
- Country: Cuba
- Language: Spanish

Lucía is a 1968 Cuban black-and-white anthology drama film directed by Humberto Solás, co-written by Solás, Julio García Espinosa and Nelson Rodríguez. It follows three independent stories in different moments of Cuban history (the Cuban War of Independence, the 1930s during the regime of Gerardo Machado, and shortly after the Cuban Revolution), all as seen through the eyes of three different women named Lucía.

It was theatrically released in Cuba on October 1968. It had its international premiere at the Directors' Fortnight section of the 1969 Cannes Film Festival. At the 6th Moscow International Film Festival, it won the Golden Prize and the FIPRESCI prize.

== Plot ==
=== 1895 ===
The wealthy Lucía Fidelina lives with her mother in Havana. One day, she is comes across Rafael at church and the two gradually begin a relationship. Lucía's brother, Felipe, is a guerilla fighter in the Cuban war of independence, hiding out at a coffee plantation. When her brother visits for one night, Lucía informs him of her happiness.

But she is heartbroken when, later, she receives a letter from Rafael's wife in Spain. Meeting with her later, Rafael confesses that though he has a wife and son in Spain, he is solely in love with her, and they make love secretly in a refinery. Wishing to run away from the city, Rafael suggests the coffee plantation her brother is hidden at, and she reveals its location to Rafael. A beggar woman who has been frequently harassed by the city's populace warns her to not go with Rafael, but is brushed off.

Later, a full-scale assault is led on the plantation. Lucía is present and when Rafael spots her, he rides away. The casualties from the battle include her brother, Felipe, and Lucía returns to the city. Finding Rafael with a group of officers in the city plaza, she stabs him to death and is comforted by the beggar woman.

=== 1932 ===
Lucía Nuñez and her mother are sent by her father to a house in the Keys to escape riots in Cienfuegos. Lucía is bored in the Keys and generally annoyed with the pettiness of her mother. One night, she spots a group helping an injured man. She later meets the injured man, Aldo, a member of the ABC, and begins to fall in love.

Lucía and her mother return to Cuba, where she reunites with Aldo, and they begin dating. She begins working to support his revolutionary activities, and writes anti-Machado slogans with a coworker in their workplace bathroom. Aldo and his two revolutionary friends assassinate several drunken soldiers in a theater, meanwhile an anti-Machado protest Lucía and Flora take part in is violently broken up by police.

The group awakens to the news that Machado has resigned, and Aldo begins clerical work in Havana in forming a new provincial government. Aldo is disgusted by Havana's bourgeoise, but is elated when he finds out Lucía is pregnant. After a night of drinking with Antonio and Flora, Aldo reveals his dissatisfaction with the revolution and Antonio agrees. Aldo is later killed in another shootout and Lucía identifies the body. Now alone, she is left to contemplate her future.

=== 1961 ===
Lucía is a worker on a large compound run by a worker cooperative. One day, she is picked up by a man, Tomás, in his truck, and the two quickly marry, spending much of their time indoors for their honeymoon. Despite the revolution, Tomás is more traditionally minded and forbids Lucía from working any longer. Attending a party at the compound, Tomás gets into a fight with a man dancing with Lucía and proceeds to board up their home to prevent her from leaving.

The worker's cooperative announces that the Cuban government is sending literacy workers from Havana to the worksite to educate everyone. One arrives at Tomás's house to teach Lucía to read and write, and though resistant, Tomás is forced to allow him to do so. While teaching Lucía, the literacy worker picks up on the abusive relationship, and begins convincing Lucía to leave. After Tomás fights the literacy worker, Lucía seeks the help of Angelina, who devises a plan for her to escape.

Returning home drunk, Tomás finds that she has left and quickly goes to find her. Discovering her working at a salt flat, he chases her but is apprehended by the other workers.

Later as a town drunk, Tomás is approached by Lucía on a beach, who wishes to reconcile but only if he lets her work again. They argue and Tomás chases after her while a little girl laughs at them from a distance.

== Cast ==
=== Part 1: Cuban War of Independence ===
- Raquel Revuelta as Lucía
- Eduardo Moure as Rafael

=== Part 2: the 1930s ===
- Eslinda Núñez as Lucía
- Ramón Brito as Aldo

=== Part 3: the 1960s ===
- Adela Legrá as Lucía
- Adolfo Llauradó as Tomás

== Release ==
It was theatrically released in Cuba on October 1968. It had its international premiere at the Directors' Fortnight section of the 1969 Cannes Film Festival. At the 6th Moscow International Film Festival, it won the Golden Prize and the FIPRESCI prize.

Lucia was digitally restored by the Cineteca di Bologna with funding from World Cinema Project and TCM and later screened at the Cannes Classics section of the 2017 Cannes Film Festival. The restored version also screened at the 2017 New York Film Festival in the Revivals section.
