= Manuel Pérez (director) =

Cuban film director (1939–2025)

- Born: 19 November 1939; Havana, Cuba
- Died: 6 November 2025 (aged 85); Havana, Cuba
- Occupations: Film director, screenwriter
- Years active: 1961–2025

Manuel Pérez Paredes (Note: In this Spanish name, the first or paternal surname is Pérez and the second or maternal family name is Paredes.) (19 November 1939 – 6 November 2025), also known as Manolito Pérez, was a Cuban film director and screenwriter. He directed seven films from 1961. His 1973 thriller drama film The Man from Maisinicu was entered into the 8th Moscow International Film Festival where it won a Special Mention. His 1977 film Río Negro was entered into the 10th Moscow International Film Festival where it won the Special Prize.

Pérez died in Havana on 6 November 2025, at the age of 85.

== Selected filmography ==
- The Man from Maisinicu (1973)
- Río Negro (1977)
- Che Guevara: Where You'd Never Imagine Him (2004)
