= Mario Balmaseda =

Cuban actor (1941 - 2022)

Mario Balmaseda (January 19, 1941 - October 8, 2022) was a Cuban actor. He appeared in over 30 films, including The Last Supper, One Way or Another, and The Project of the Century.
