= Camilo Vives =

Cuban film producer

Camilo Vives (c. 1942 – March 14, 2013) was a Cuban film producer. He produced more than forty Cuban films during his career, including Lucía, released in 1968, and Fresa y Chocolate (Strawberry and Chocolate) in 1994.

Vives joined the Instituto Cubano del Arte y la Industria Cinematográficos (ICAIC), the state-controlled film arm of the Cuban government, which had been established in 1959 following the Cuban Revolution. He became head of the ICAIC's production studios during the 1970s. In 2001, he was promoted to head of the International Production division of the ICAIC.

Vives produced films by Cuban and Spanish film directors. His credits with Cuban directors included Lucía, Miel para Oshun and Barrio Cuba for director Humberto Solás; and Life is to Whistle in 1998 and Suite Habana in 2003 for director Fernando Pérez. Vives frequently collaborated with Cuban director the late Cuban filmmaker Tomás Gutiérrez Alea. Their films include The Last Supper in 1976, Fresa y Chocolate in 1994, and Guantanamera in 1995. In 2004, Vives produced Tres veces dos, which marked the debut of three Cuban film directors - Pavel Giroud, Lester Hamlet and Esteban Garcia Insausti. He also produced the 2001 Canadian-British-Italian-Cuban co-production The Sea Wolf (also released as SeaWolf: The Pirate's Curse) and the 2005 Spanish-Cuban film, Habana Blues, directed by Benito Zambrano.

Vives died on March 14, 2013, at the age of 71.
