= Luis Alberto García (actor) =

Cuban actor (born 1961)

Luis Alberto García Novoa (born 10 November 1961) is a Cuban actor who has worked in film, television, theatre and radio. His film credits include Clandestinos (1987), Plaff o demasiado miedo a la vida (1989), Adorables mentiras (1990), El elefante y la bicicleta (1992), Guantanamera (1995), En la puta calle (1997), Zafiros: Locura Azul (1997), La vida es silbar (1998), Madrigal (2006), Che (2008), Boleto al paraíso (2010), La partida (2013), Vestido de novia (2014), Viva (2015), Ya no es antes (2016), and Los Frikis (2024). He has received acting awards at the Cartagena Film Festival, the Amiens International Film Festival, the Viña del Mar International Film Festival, and the Havana Film Festival. In 2023 he received the Lucía de Honor at the Gibara International Film Festival.

== Early life and education ==
Luis Alberto García Novoa was born in Havana, Cuba, on 10 November 1961. He studied acting at the Instituto Superior de Arte (ISA) in Havana, graduating in 1985. García has also worked in television and radio. He directed the documentary Leal al tiempo, about Cuban historian Eusebio Leal.

== Career ==
=== 1980s ===
García began appearing professionally in Cuban film and television in the 1980s. His early screen credits included Rolando Díaz's En tres y dos (1986) and Juan Carlos Tabío's short film Dolly Back (1986). His role in Fernando Pérez's first feature film, Clandestinos (1987), was Ernesto Ardeniz. He appeared opposite Isabel Santos, who played Nereida. This role granted him great popularity Contemporary Cuban publications discussed the film and its performers. ENDAC's bibliography records interviews with García and Santos in Opina and Juventud Rebelde, articles in Bohemia and Cuba Internacional, and a study of the film by Vivian Gamoneda in Cine Cubano no. 119. At the 28th Cartagena Film Festival in 1988, García received the India Catalina award for Best Actor for Clandestinos. García subsequently appeared in Plaff o demasiado miedo a la vida (1989), directed by Juan Carlos Tabío.

=== 1990s ===
García appeared in several Cuban and international productions during the 1990s. His credits included Gerardo Chijona's Adorables mentiras (1990), Tiempos de grisalla (1991), El elefante y la bicicleta (1992), Pon tu pensamiento en mí (1994), and Tomás Gutiérrez Alea and Juan Carlos Tabío's Guantanamera (1995). He also appeared in the Spanish productions Demasiado caliente para ti and Calor... y celos in 1996, and in Enrique Gabriel's En la puta calle. In this film, García played Andy, a Cuban immigrant living in Madrid. He won the Best Actor award at the Amiens International Film Festival. García also appeared in Cosas que dejé en La Habana (1997), Historias clandestinas en La Habana (1997), directed by Diego Musiak, and Mambí (1997). In Zafiros: Locura Azul (1997), directed by Manuel Herrera, García appeared in the dramatization of the Cuban vocal group Los Zafiros. At the 38th Cartagena Film Festival in 1998, he received the India Catalina award for Best Actor for the film. García appeared in Las profecías de Amanda (1998) and in Fernando Pérez's La vida es silbar (1998). In the latter, he played Elpidio, one of the film's principal characters. At the XI Viña del Mar International Film Festival in 1999, García received the Best Actor award for La vida es silbar; the film also received the festival's Best Film award.

=== 2000s ===
García's film credits in the early 2000s included Hacerse el sueco (2000), Malabana (2001), Molina's Test (2001), Gente que llora (2001), Santa Camila de la Habana Vieja (2002), Rumba buena (2002), Crisis (2002), Escuadra hacia la muerte (2003), Perfecto amor equivocado (2004), Adolfo (2004), and the short film Monte Rouge (2004). He appeared in Fernando Pérez's Madrigal (2006), in which he played Ángel. García subsequently appeared in Steven Soderbergh's two-part biographical film Che (2008), portraying Cuban military officer Joaquín Casillas Lumpuy.

=== 2010–2015 ===
In Gerardo Chijona's Boleto al paraíso (2010), García played Armando. He appeared in Juan of the Dead (2011) as the father of one of the characters and in Ian Padrón's Habanastation (2011). He also appeared in 7 Days in Havana (2012), an anthology film directed by several filmmakers, including Laurent Cantet. In Esther en alguna parte (2013), directed by Gerardo Chijona, García played Lieutenant Chang. In Antonio Hens's La partida (2013), released in English as The Last Match, García played Silvano. In 2014, García appeared in Boccaccerías Habaneras and Marilyn Solaya's Vestido de novia, in which he played Ernesto, the husband of Rosa Elena, played by Laura de la Uz.

=== 2015–present ===
In the Irish-Cuban production Viva, directed by Paddy Breathnach, García played Mama, the proprietor of a Havana drag club. He appeared opposite Héctor Medina, who played Jesús. In Lester Hamlet's Ya no es antes (2016), García played Esteban opposite Isabel Santos. He received the Coral Award for Best Actor at the 38th Havana Film Festival. García appeared in the television series Four Seasons in Havana (Vientos de La Habana), based on Leonardo Padura's Havana Quartet novels. He played Carlos "El Flaco". In Before the Ferry Arrives (2018), García played Humberto. The film circulated at international festivals including the Warsaw International Film Festival, the Buenos Aires International Festival of Independent Cinema, and the AFI Latin American Film Festival. His later credits include the television series The Cry of the Butterflies (El grito de las mariposas) (2023), in which he played Rafael Leónidas Trujillo, and the film Los habitantes (2023). In 2023, García received the Lucía de Honor at the Gibara International Film Festival. He dedicated the award to the Asamblea de Cineastas Cubanos. García appeared in the American independent film Los Frikis (2024), directed by Tyler Nilson and Michael Schwartz. He played Mateo, the uncle of Paco and Gustavo.

== Selected filmography ==
=== Film ===
- 1986 – Dolly Back, directed by Juan Carlos Tabío
- 1986 – En tres y dos, directed by Rolando Díaz
- 1987 – Clandestinos, directed by Fernando Pérez
- 1989 – Plaff o demasiado miedo a la vida, directed by Juan Carlos Tabío
- 1990 – Adorables mentiras, directed by Gerardo Chijona
- 1990 – Nuestro amigo secreto, directed by Carlos Aguilar
- 1991 – Tiempos de grisalla, directed by David Rodríguez
- 1992 – El elefante y la bicicleta, directed by Juan Carlos Tabío
- 1992 – Vidas paralelas, directed by Pastor Vega
- 1995 – Pon tu pensamiento en mí, directed by Arturo Sotto
- 1995 – Guantanamera, directed by Tomás Gutiérrez Alea and Juan Carlos Tabío
- 1996 – Demasiado caliente para ti
- 1996 – Calor... y celos, directed by Javier Rebollo
- 1996 – En la puta calle, directed by Enrique Gabriel
- 1996 – Cuba Libre, directed by José Luis Jusid
- 1997 – Cosas que dejé en La Habana, directed by Manuel Gutiérrez Aragón
- 1997 – Historias clandestinas en La Habana, directed by Diego Musiak
- 1997 – Mambí, directed by Teodoro and Santiago Ríos
- 1997 – Zafiros: Locura Azul, directed by Manuel Herrera
- 1998 – Las profecías de Amanda, directed by Pastor Vega
- 1998 – La vida es silbar, directed by Fernando Pérez
- 1999 – Un paraíso bajo las estrellas, directed by Gerardo Chijona
- 2006 – Madrigal, directed by Fernando Pérez
- 2010 – Boleto al paraíso, directed by Gerardo Chijona
- 2013 – Bocaccerías habaneras, directed by Arturo Sotto
- 2013 – Vestido de novia, directed by Marilyn Solaya
- 2013 – Espejuelos oscuros, directed by Jessica Rodríguez
- 2015 – Viva, directed by Paddy Breathnach
- 2016 – Ya no es antes, directed by Lester Hamlet
- 2017 – Antes de que llegue el Ferry, directed by Juan Caunedo
- 2025 – Estrés, directed by Marilyn Solaya

== Awards and recognitions ==
- 1988 – Best Actor, Cartagena Film Festival, for Clandestinos.
- 1998 – Best Actor, Amiens International Film Festival, for En la puta calle.
- 1998 – Best Actor, Cartagena Film Festival, for Zafiros: Locura Azul.
- 1999 – Best Actor, Viña del Mar International Film Festival, for La vida es silbar.
- 2016 – Coral Award for Best Actor, Havana Film Festival, for Ya no es antes.
