= List of accolades received by Behavior =

Behavior (Spanish: Conducta) is a 2014 Cuban drama film directed by Ernesto Daranas.

Award	Date of ceremony	Country	Category	Recipient(s) and nominee(s)	Result	Ref(s)
Platino Awards	2nd Platino Awards, July 18, 2015	Spain	Best Ibero-American Film	Behavior	Nominated	
Platino Awards	2nd Platino Awards, July 18, 2015	Spain	Best Direction	Ernesto Daranas	Nominated	
Platino Awards	2nd Platino Awards, July 18, 2015	Spain	Best Screenplay	Ernesto Daranas	Nominated	
Platino Awards	2nd Platino Awards, July 18, 2015	Spain	Best Original Score	Juan Antonio Leyva, Magda Rosa Galbán	Nominated	
Platino Awards	2nd Platino Awards, July 18, 2015	Spain	Best Editing	Pedro Suárez	Nominated	
Platino Awards	2nd Platino Awards, July 18, 2015	Spain	Best Art Direction	Erick Grass	Nominated	
Platino Awards	2nd Platino Awards, July 18, 2015	Spain	Best Cinematography	Alejandro Pérez	Nominated	
Platino Awards	2nd Platino Awards, July 18, 2015	Spain	Best Sound	Osmany Olivare, Juan Carlos Herrera	Nominated	
Goya Awards	29th Goya Awards, February 7, 2015	Spain	Best Ibero-American Film	Behavior	Nominated	
Ariel Awards	57th Ariel Awards, May 27, 2015	Mexico	Best Ibero-American Film	Behavior	Nominated	
Malaga Film Festival, Territorio Latinoamericano Section	March 29, 2014 (17th edition)	Spain	Biznaga de Plata to Best Film	Behavior	Won	
Malaga Film Festival, Territorio Latinoamericano Section	March 29, 2014 (17th edition)	Spain	Biznaga de Plata to Best Direction	Ernesto Daranas	Won	
Malaga Film Festival, Territorio Latinoamericano Section	March 29, 2014 (17th edition)	Spain	Biznaga de Plata to Best Actress	Alina Rodríguez	Won	
Malaga Film Festival, Territorio Latinoamericano Section	March 29, 2014 (17th edition)	Spain	Biznaga de Plata Audience Award	Behavior	Won	
Havana Film Festival New York	April, 2014 (15th edition)	United States	Best Feature	Behavior	Won	
Havana Film Festival New York	April, 2014 (15th edition)	United States	Best Actress	Alina Rodríguez	Won	
Lima Film Festival	August, 2014 (18th edition)	Peru	Audience Award	Behavior	Won	
International Film Festival of India	45th International Film Festival of India, November, 2014	India	IFFI Best Actor Award (Female)	Alina Rodríguez (ex aequo)	Won	
Festival de Cine Iberoamericano de Huelva	November, 2014 (40th edition)	Spain	Carabela de Plata to Best Film (Rabida section)	Behavior	Won	
Brasilia International Film Festival	August–September 2014 (3rd edition)	Brasil	Best Screenplay	Ernesto Daranas	Won	
Brasilia International Film Festival	August–September 2014 (3rd edition)	Brasil	Best Actor	Armando Valdés Freire	Won	
Zlín Film Festival	2015 (55th edition)	Czech Republic	The Golden Slipper for the Best Feature Film for Youth	Behavior	Won	
Giffoni Film Festival	July, 2014	Italy	Griphon Award for Best Feature Film (Generator +13)	Behavior	Won	
SCHLINGEL International Film Festival	October, 2014	Germany	Junior Film Award	Behavior	Won	
SCHLINGEL International Film Festival	October, 2014	Germany	FIPRESCI Award	Behavior	Won	
Trinidad and Tobago Film Festival	September, 2014 (9th edition)	Trinidad and Tobago	Best Narrative Feature	Behavior	Won	
Trinidad and Tobago Film Festival	September, 2014 (9th edition)	Trinidad and Tobago	Special Mention of the Youth Jury	Behavior	Won	
Bogotá Film Festival	October 30, 2014 (31st edition)	Colombia	Círculo Precolombino de Oro to Best Film	Behavior	Won	
Bogotá Film Festival	October 30, 2014 (31st edition)	Colombia	UNICEF Award to the Best Film about childhood	Behavior	Won	
Fine Arts International Film Festival	October 8, 2014 (5th edition)	Dominican Republic	Best Male Performance	Armando Valdés Freire	Won	
FILMAR en América Latina	November, 2014 (16th edition)	Switzerland	Audience Award	Behavior	Won	
Pune International Film Festival	January, 2015 (13th edition)	India	Best International Film	Behavior	Won	
Rencontres du Cinéma Sud-Américain de Marseille	March, 2015 (17th edition)	France	Audience Award	Behavior	Won	
Rencontres du Cinéma Sud-Américain de Marseille	March, 2015 (17th edition)	France	Best Actor	Behavior's children ensemble	Won	
SKIP CITY INTERNATIONAL D-Cinema FESTIVAL	July 26, 2015 (12th edition)	Japan	Grand Prize	Behavior	Won	
Lleida Latin-American Film Festival	April, 2015 (21st edition)	Spain	Audience Award (first place)	Behavior	Won	
Lleida Latin-American Film Festival	April, 2015 (21st edition)	Spain	Best Actress	Alina Rodríguez	Won	
Lleida Latin-American Film Festival	April, 2015 (21st edition)	Spain	Best Film Honorable Mention	Behavior	Won	
Reflets du cinéma ibérique et latino-américain	March, 2015 (31st edition)	France	Audience Award	Behavior	Won	
Cine a la Vista! Youth International Film Festival	May, 2015 (2nd edition)	Argentina	Best Film (+13 section)	Behavior	Won	
Havana Film Festival	December, 2014 (36th edition)	Cuba	Grand Coral - First Prize	Behavior	Won	
Havana Film Festival	December, 2014 (36th edition)	Cuba	Best Male Performance	Armando Valdés Freire	Won	
Havana Film Festival	December, 2014 (36th edition)	Cuba	SIGNIS Award	Behavior	Won	
Havana Film Festival	December, 2014 (36th edition)	Cuba	UNEAC Award	Behavior	Won	
Havana Film Festival	December, 2014 (36th edition)	Cuba	UNICEF Award	Behavior	Won	
