= The Elephant and the Bicycle =

1994 Cuban film

- El elefante y la bicicleta
- Directed by: Juan Carlos Tabío
- Written by: Juan Carlos Tabío; Eliseo Alberto
- Produced by: Rafael Rey
- Starring: Luis Alberto García; Liliam Vega; Raúl Pomares
- Cinematography: Julio Valdés
- Edited by: Lina Baniela
- Music by: José María Vitier
- Production companies: ICAIC, Film 4
- Release date: December 1994
- Running time: 81 minutes
- Countries: Cuba, United Kingdom
- Language: Spanish

The Elephant and the Bicycle (Spanish: El elefante y la bicicleta) is a 1994 Cuban surrealist comedy film directed by Juan Carlos Tabío, and written by Tabío and Eliseo Alberto. The film makes use of magical realism and metatextuality to create a parable of Cuban history from its first conquest through the Cuban Revolution, and pay homage to 100 years of cinema.

The film stars Luis Alberto García, Liliam Vega, and Raúl Pomares, and was produced by Rafael Rey.

Set in 1925 on an allegorical version of Cuba (an island called La Fe), the film follows El Isleño, an ex-con who returns to his island with a silent movie projector and a print of a version of "Robin Hood". When repeated viewings of the film reaffirm the revolutionary sentiment in the air, the film is transformed in the eyes of its audience into a drama paralleling their own struggle – one in which the underdogs rise up against the island's unpopular landowner, with the villages themselves taking part in the action.

It premiered at the sixteenth Havana Film Festival in 1994, where it won two awards, and was later nominated for a Goya Award for Best Spanish Language Foreign Film in 1996.

The film was co-produced internationally by ICAIC in Cuba and Channel 4 in the United Kingdom.

== Plot ==
El elefante y la bicicleta follows El Isleño, a young man who returns to his island home, La Fe, after two years in jail with hopes of making a fortune and marrying his childhood love, Marina Soledad. He brings with him a cinematograph, the first the islanders have ever seen, and a single film, Robin Hood. The island, ruled by the despotic Francisco Gavilán, has been isolated from the mainland by a fragile wooden bridge.

After the first screening of Robin Hood, the bridge mysteriously collapses, severing the island's connection to the outside world, just as in the film, where Robin Hood defies the Sheriff by cutting off access to his territory. This event sparks the islanders’ imagination, and as El Isleño continues to show the same film every night, the villagers see it differently each time, projecting their own desires and frustrations onto the story. They begin to connect their lives with the film's plot, interpreting the struggle of Robin Hood as their own fight against Gavilán's oppressive rule.

Soon the screenings become more than entertainment, inspiring the villagers to act. Each night, they begin to see a “different” film that reflects their growing revolutionary actions. As they plan to rise up against Gavilán, they are spurred on by El Isleño's love for Marina Soledad, who herself becomes a symbol of hope and freedom.

By the end, the villagers’ lives and actions are reflected literally on the movie screen itself, symbolizing a complete convergence of cinema and reality, with the audience facing themselves as projected spectators.

=== Setting ===
The film is set in an allegorical version of Cuba (an island called La Fe), which has drawn critical comparisons with Macondo, the setting of Gabriel García Márquez's One Hundred Years of Solitude, Comala, the setting of Juan Rulfo's Pedro Páramo, William Faulkner's Yoknapatawpha County, George Orwell's eponymous Animal Farm, and Maravillas de Noveras, the setting of Daniel Díaz Torres's 1991 film Alicia en el pueblo de Maravillas.

== Cast ==
=== Main cast ===
- Luis Alberto García as El Isleño
- Liliam Vega as Marina Soledad
- Raúl Pomares as Gavilán
- Martha Farré as Da. Iluminada
- Daisy Granados as Da. Mercedes/La gitana
- Adolfo Llaurado as Prudencio
- Patricio Wood as Santiago
- Fidelio Torres as Samuel
- Luis Alberto García as Abelardo
- Paula Ali as Eloisa
- Elvira Enriquez as Serafina/Institutriz
- Osvaldo Doimeadiós as Cura
- Serafín García as Maldonado

=== Additional players ===
- Gladys Zurbano as Nila
- Alejandro Palomino as Rojo
- Alexander Rey as Felipe
- Jose Hernandez as Borracho
- Grisell Riestra, Audrey Gutierrez, Mercedes Gonzalez, and Regla Plaza as Prostitutas
- Roberto Viña as Mejicano
- Livio Delgado as Pagador de promesas
- Marcia Arencibia as Sra. Gavilán
- Talia Acosta and Claudia Cruz as Hijas de Gavilán

=== The children ===
- Juan Manuel Tabío
- Maria Laura García
- Claudia García
- Maikel García
- Ismael Diego
- Carlos Calderin
- Alvaro Fleites
- Rachel Martinez

== Production ==
=== Attempted censorship ===
El elefante y la bicicleta was produced at the peak of the Cuban crisis known as the "Special Period", during a moment of profound change and uncertainty.

During production on El elefante y la bicicleta, Carlos Aldana, the head of ideological matters for the Communist Party of Cuba (PCC), wrote to Alfredo Guevara, the creator and then-president of ICAIC, recommending he postpone the project.

In his letter, Aldana challenges Guevara to pressure the filmmakers into altering the script, citing the film's ideological ambiguity as a potential spark for controversy that could jeopardize Guevara's position at ICAIC.

In a 2014 interview with Claudia González Machado reflecting on Tabío's life and career, Tabío himself suggests that Aldana's letter – contrary to its intention – may be what saved the film from oblivion, stating:

"Alfredo was not going to allow Aldana (just as he had not allowed any other minister of culture) to dictate which films could or could not be made."

=== Involvement of Rapi Diego ===
As production was starting on the 1993 film Fresa y chocolate, director Tomás Gutierrez Alea asked Juan Carlos Tabío to assist him with directing duties on the film when he was called in for an emergency surgery. Tabío agreed, and handed over his responsibilities on El elefante y la bicicleta to director and illustrator Constante "Rapi" Diego. Once production on Fresa y chocolate concluded, Tabío resumed his work on the film.

== Cultural references ==
El elefante y la bicicleta features images from the films Stories of the Revolution (Historias de la revolución) (1960) by Tomás Gutierrez Alea, Battleship Potemkin (1925) by Sergei Eisenstein, ¡Patakín! quiere decir ¡fábula! (1981) by Manuel Octavio Gomez, The New School (1974) and El huerto (1974) by Jorge Fraga, Cascos blancos (1975) by Fernando Pérez, and Hombres del mar (1975) by Manuel Herrera.

== Marketing ==
The film's poster was designed by Eduardo Marín.

== Release and reception ==
El elefante y la bicicleta premiered at the sixteenth Havana Film Festival in December 1994. The film was considered a sharp conceptual turn for Tabío, reflective of Cuba's dire socioeconomic situation in the 1990s.

=== Awards ===
El elefante y la bicicleta was nominated for Best Spanish Language Foreign Film (Mejor Película Extranjera de Habla Hispana) at the 1996 Goya Awards.

At the sixteenth Havana Film Festival in 1994, Liliam Vega was awarded the Coral Prize for Best Female Performance (tied with Lucía Muñoz for The Beginning and the End (1993), and Juan Carlos Tabío was awarded the FIPRESCI Prize Special Mention. The film was also awarded the Second Prize at Damascus International Film Festival in 1995, and the Audience Award at Brussels International Film Festival in 1997.

=== Comparisons to other media ===
In its reference and homage to cinema as an instrument for transforming reality, El elefante y la bicicleta has been likened to films like The Purple Rose of Cairo, The Eyes of the Scissors, and Cinema Paradiso.
