= List of Cuban submissions for the Academy Award for Best International Feature Film =

Best International Feature Film submissions from Cuba

Highlights
- Debut: 1978
- Submissions: 24
- Nominations: 1
- Oscar winners: none

Cuba has submitted films for consideration in the Academy Award for Best International Feature Film (Note: The category was previously named the Academy Award for Best Foreign Language Film, but this was changed to the Academy Award for Best International Feature Film in April 2019, after the Academy deemed the word "Foreign" to be outdated.) since 1978. The award is handed out annually by the United States Academy of Motion Picture Arts and Sciences to a feature-length motion picture produced outside the United States that contains primarily non-English dialogue.

As of 2026, Cuba was nominated only once for Strawberry and Chocolate (1993).

== Submissions ==
Every year, each country is invited by the Academy of Motion Picture Arts and Sciences to submit its best film for the Academy Award for Best International Feature Film. The International Feature Film Committee oversees the process and reviews all the submitted films. Following this, they vote via secret ballot to determine the five nominees for the award.

The Cuban nominee is selected annually by the Cuban Film Institute, the Instituto Cubano del Arte e Industria Cinematográficos (ICAIC).

Cuba's first submission was directed by Miguel Littin, a leftist Chilean filmmaker who was nominated in this category twice, representing Mexico in 1975/76 (for Letters from Marusia) and Nicaragua in 1982/83 (for Alsino and the Condor). He later represented his native Chile in 2009.

The country only nomination was the a gay-themed comedy Strawberry and Chocolate (1993), directed by the Cuban acclaimed filmmaker Tomás Gutiérrez Alea and co-directed by Juan Carlos Tabío.

Most of the films submitted are in Spanish. The following is a list of the films submitted by Cuba in the Best Foreign Language Film category at the Academy Awards.

Year (Ceremony)	English title	Original title	Language(s)	Director	Result
1978 (51st)	Viva el Presidente	El recurso del método	Spanish	Miguel Littín	Not nominated
1987 (60th)	A Successful Man	Un hombre de éxito	Spanish	Humberto Solás	Not nominated
1988 (61st)	Letters from the Park	Cartas del parque	Spanish	Tomás Gutiérrez Alea	Not nominated
1989 (62nd)	Supporting Roles	Papeles secundarios	Spanish	Orlando Rojas	Not nominated
1990 (63rd)	The Beauty of the Alhambra	La bella del Alhambra	Spanish	Enrique Pineda Barnet	Not nominated
1991 (64th)	Hello Hemingway		Spanish	Fernando Perez	Not nominated
1992 (65th)	Adorable Lies	Adorables mentiras	Spanish	Gerardo Chijona	Not nominated
1994 (67th)	Strawberry and Chocolate	Fresa y chocolate	Spanish	Tomás Gutiérrez Alea and Juan Carlos Tabío	Nominated
1996 (69th)	Think of Me	Pon tu pensamiento en mí	Spanish	Arturo Sotto Díaz	Not nominated
1997 (70th)	Vertical Love	Amor vertical	Spanish	Arturo Sotto Díaz	Not nominated
2002 (75th)	Nothing More	Nada	Spanish	Juan Carlos Cremata	Not nominated
2003 (76th)	Suite Habana		No dialogue	Fernando Perez	Not nominated
2005: (78th)	Viva Cuba		Spanish	Juan Carlos Cremata	Not nominated
2006 (79th)	El Benny		Spanish	Jorge Luis Sánchez	Not nominated
2007 (80th)	The Silly Age	La edad de la peseta	Spanish	Pavel Giroud	Not nominated
2009 (82nd)	Fallen Gods	Los dioses rotos	Spanish, Yoruba	Ernesto Daranas	Not nominated
2011 (84th)	Habanastation		Spanish	Ian Padrón	Not nominated
2014 (87th)	Behavior	Conducta	Spanish	Ernesto Daranas	Not nominated
2016 (89th)	The Companion	El acompañante	Spanish	Pavel Giroud	Not nominated
2018 (91st)	Sergio and Sergei	Sergio & Sergei	Spanish, English, Russian	Ernesto Daranas	Not on the final list
2019 (92nd)	A Translator	Un traductor	Spanish, Russian	Rodrigo Barriuso and Sebastián Barriuso	Not nominated
2020 (93rd)	Buscando a Casal		Spanish	Jorge Luis Sánchez	Not nominated
2023 (96th)	Nelsito's World	El mundo de Nelsito	Spanish	Fernando Pérez	Disqualified
2026 (99th)	Malecón		Spanish	Carlos Larrazabal	Pending
