= Havana Film Festival New York =

- Location: New York City
- Founded: 2000; 26 years ago
- Founded by: Carole Rosenberg, Ivan Giroud, Kenneth Halsband, Marcia Donalds
- Awards: Havana Star Prize for Best Film (Fiction), Best Documentary, Best Director, Best Screenplay, Best Actor, Best Actress
- Artistic director: Diana Vargas (2003–present)
- Website: hffny.com (in English)

The Havana Film Festival New York (HFFNY) is a film festival, based in New York City, that screens cinema from across Latin America with a special focus on Cuba and its film industry. It is a project of The American Friends of the Ludwig Foundation of Cuba, a 501(c)(3) tax-exempt organization with the mission of building cultural bridges between the United States and Cuba through arts projects.

Since 2000, HFFNY has presented films featured at the International Festival of New Latin American Cinema in Havana. The Festival includes lectures, panel discussions, networking receptions and film industry workshops.

== History ==
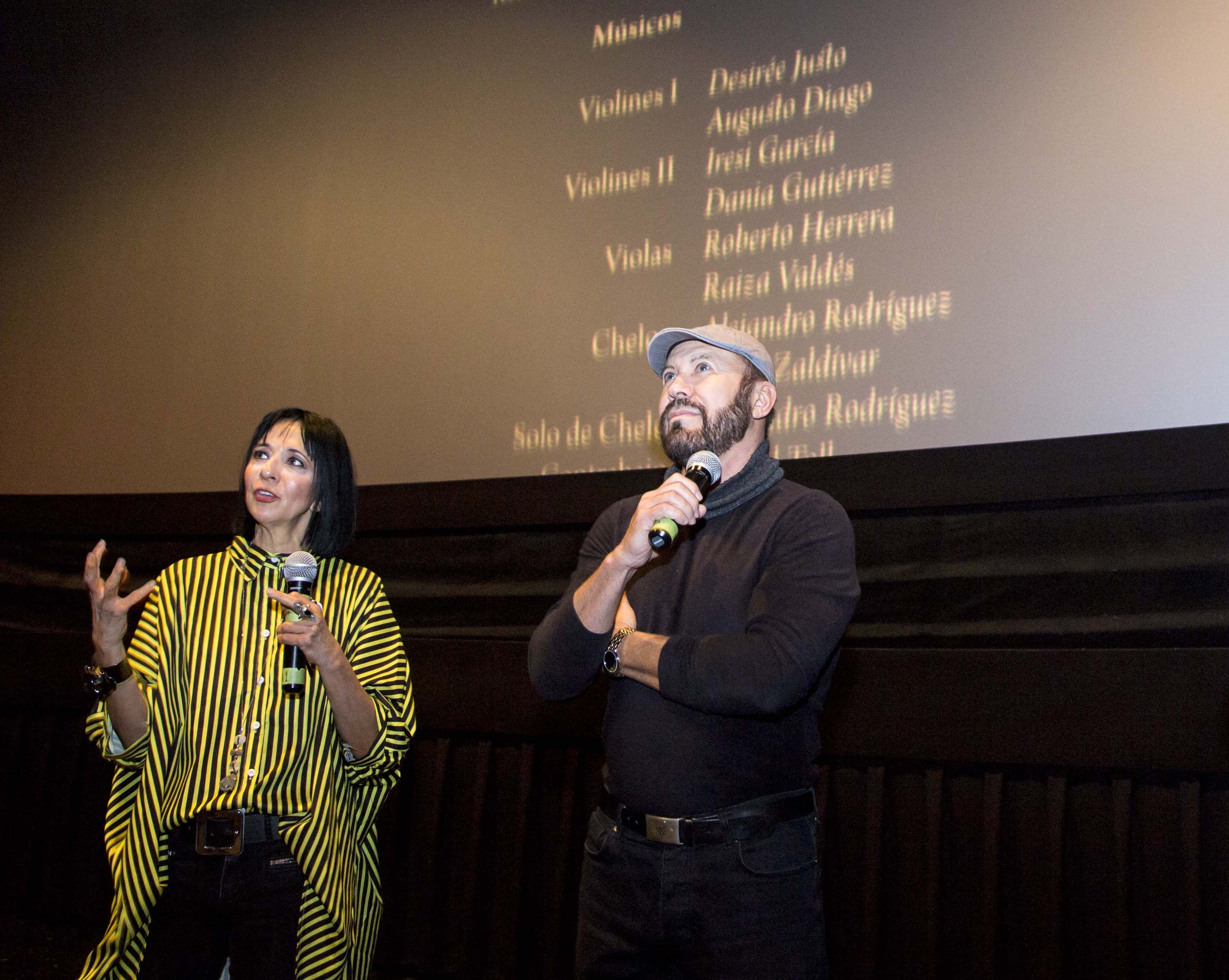
Artistic Director Diana Vargas leads a Q&A with Cuban actor Hector Noas at AMC, 2019

=== Overview ===
The Festival was founded in 2000 by Ivan Giroud, President of the Havana Film Festival in Havana; Carole Rosenberg, President of The American Friends of the Ludwig Foundation of Cuba; film producer Kenneth Halsband; and Marcia Donalds, who was a film professor at New York University Tisch School of the Arts.

In 2001, film producer and programmer Diana Vargas joined the festival, and since 2003 she has served as HFFNY's Artistic Director.

=== 2000 - Inaugural festival ===
The inaugural Havana Film Festival NY was held at the Anthology Film Archives from March 17–26, 2000. It featured an entirely Cuban program, and screened over 40 productions, including features, documentaries, shorts and animated films that provided an overview of 41 years of Cuban filmmaking while showcasing several award-winning films from Havana's International Festival of New Latin American Cinema. The first HFFNY also included seminars on Cuban films and their distribution in the United States. The event was opened by singer, songwriter, actor, and activist Harry Belafonte.

=== 2001-2008 ===
The second HFFNY expanded its program to include Latin American films. It ran April 16–23, 2001 and featured over 60 films from Cuba, Spain, Mexico, Colombia, Bolivia, Ecuador, Uruguay, Puerto Rico, Nicaragua, Argentina, Peru, Chile, Venezuela, Brazil and Panama. Daily screenings took place in Manhattan at NYU's Cantor Film Center, Clearview Cinema, and Anthology Film Archives, and Sunnyside Center Cinemas in Queens. Approximately 8,000 people attended the 2001 HFFNY, according to the festival's co-director and programmer Pedro Zurita, in a 2002 New York Times interview.

The third HFFNY ran April 18–27, 2002 at venues in Manhattan, Queens, and The Bronx. Cuban filmmaker Humberto Solás was the honoree, and the festival opened with his film Honey for Oshun. Among the special events featured at the third HFFNY was a panel discussion with visiting directors on the role played by Latin American literature in filmmaking, which included the films Dark Side of the Heart 2 by Argentine director Eliseo Subiela, Miracle in Rome by Colombian filmmaker Lisandro Duque, and Mexican director Arturo Ripestein's No One Writes to the Colonel, and a roundtable discussion with actor and activist Danny Glover and Congressman Charles Rangel at the Harvard Club on U.S. Cuban Relations.

The fourth festival ran March 26-April 2, 2003 with its main slate of screenings at the Clearview Cinema in Manhattan. Films also played at NYU Cantor Film Center and Anthology Film Archives, Sunnyside Center Cinema and the Museum of the Moving Image in Queens, and the Bronx Museum of the Arts and Hostos Center for the Arts & Culture in The Bronx. The festival opened with the NY premiere of the Cuban film Nada by Juan Carlos Cremata and closed with the NY premiere of the Colombian film Bolivar soy yo by Jorge Alí Triana. Special events included a tribute to Cuban filmmaker Julio García Espinosa and the presentation of Rogelio París' 1964 musical documentary Nosotros la música.

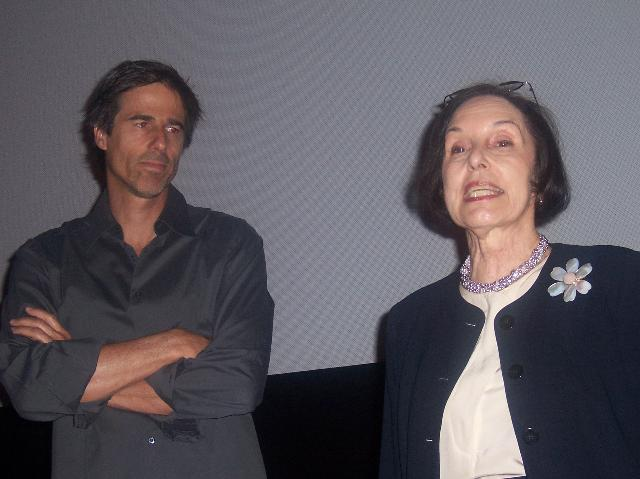
AFLFC President Carole Rosenberg introduces HFFNY honoree Walter Salles at the Quad Cinema, 2005

The fifth Havana Film Festival NY was presented by The New York Times and ran April 22–29, 2004. It paid homage to Puerto Rican filmmaker Jacobo Morales and included 37 films from Cuba, Mexico, Puerto Rico, Colombia, Chile, Argentina, Brazil and the Dominican Republic. The festival opened with the NY premiere of Cuban documentary Suite Habana by Fernando Pérez and closed with the NY premiere of Colombian comedy film El carro by Luis Orjuela. The main slate of screenings took place at Manhattan's Quad Cinema, with special programs at Hostos Center for the Arts & Culture in The Bronx and NYU's King Juan Carlos I of Spain Center. HFFNY 2005 free panels and events included: A Conversation with Jacobo Morales, Cuban Cinema Classics: Revolutionary Documentaries, and New Languages for Latin American Cinema- a roundtable discussion with filmmakers Miguel Coyula, Luis Ospina, Sergio Wolf, Sinnel Sandoval, Alejandro Fernandez, Patricia Riggen, Mercedes Jimenez, Luis Orjuela, Sandra Bilicich, Luciana Tomasi, Elias Jimenez, Pedro Diaz, Jacobo Morales, Alejandro Chomski, Fernando Pérez and Rigoberto Lopez.

The sixth HFFNY ran April 15–21, 2005, and included tributes to Cuban director Pastor Vega and Brazilian director Walter Salles. The program featured newly-released independent films from and about Latin American and the Caribbean alongside classics, documentaries, short and animated films from 12 countries. Free events occurred at NYU's King Juan Carlos Center and included the children's program Latin American Films for Children / Animation 4 Kids. Screenings also took place at the Quad Cinema in Manhattan, and the Museum of the Moving Image in Queens. HFFNY returned to the Quad Cinema April 21-27, 2006 for its seventh edition, with free events and screenings hosted by NYU's King Juan Carlos I of Spain Center, Hunter College, The New School, the Museum of the Moving Image, and the Metropolitan Museum of Art. Special programs included a tribute to the 20th anniversary of EICTV (Escuela Internacional de Cine y TV, San Antonio de los Baños, Cuba) presented by festival guest and EICTV co-founder Fernando Birri, and the children's program Latin American Films for Children / Animation 4 Kids.

The eighth HFFNY ran April 13-19, 2007 at the Quad Cinema, with free events and screenings at NYU, the Museum of the Moving Image, and the Metropolitan Museum of Art, and included a tribute to Cuban actor Jorge Perugorría, a showcase of short films by NY-based filmmakers called A Small Lens on What's to Come and its children's program Latin American Films for Children. The Quad Cinema continued to be the main venue for the ninth HFFNY, which ran April 10-18, 2008 and honored Cuban director Juan Carlos Tabío, Cuban actor Luis Alberto Garcia and American documentary filmmaker Estela Bravo. The festival was a part of NYC's Immigrant Heritage Week and partnered with The New Children/New York Film Project to host a program devoted to films by New Children/New York filmmakers.

=== 2009 - 10th anniversary ===
HFFNY celebrated its 10th anniversary April 16-23, 2009 with a special kickoff presentation sponsored by TD Bank at Queens Theatre in the Park on April 14 called Short Time! a selection of four shorts by young filmmakers from Spain, Dominican Republic and the U.S. It officially opened at the New York DGA Theater on April 16 and continued its main slate of screenings at the Quad Cinema. Additional venues included the Metropolitan Museum of Art, the Bronx Museum of the Arts, NYU, and Hunter College. Retrospectives included The Urgent Cinema of Santiago Alvarez, Stranger Than Fiction: A Tribute to Luis Ospina, and Remembering Humberto Solás, 1941-2008. Among the free filmmaker panels and lectures were the programs Cinema of Puerto Rico: Challenges and Implications of a Rising Cinema featuring filmmakers Jacobo Morales, Lilian Rosado, Pedro Perez Rosado and Juanma Fernandez, and New Views (Nuevas Miradas) a presentation of award-winning films from Cuba's EICTV followed by a conversation between EICTV director Tanya Valette, professor and filmmaker Russell Porter, and Film London Chairman Sandy Lieberson, on the school and its students new visions for Latin American Cinema.

== Controversy ==
In 2017 the festival withdrew the film Santa & Andrés from its competition. Its director Carlos Lechuga alleged that the desition was made due to pressure from the Cuban Government. Festival director Carole Rosenberg denied it, stating that the film did not fit the organization's mission of cultural exchange.

The event let to public protests and letters from the artistic community. The Human Rights Foundation called on the festival to reinstate the film, citing evidence that the decision followed contact with ICAIC. A separate open letter was signed by 77 artists and filmmakers which included Tania Brugera, Coco Fusco, Andy García, and Miguel Coyula.

== Havana Star Prize winners ==
In 2010 HFFNY began to award the Havana Star Prize to participating films for Best Film, Best Director, and Best Screenplay. The image for the prize was designed by Cuban artist Yoan Capote. In 2011 HFFNY added a category for Best Documentary, and in 2014 the Havana Star Prizes for Best Actor and Best Actress were introduced.

=== Best Film (fiction) ===
Year	English title	Original title	Director(s)	Country
2010	Memories of Overdevelopment	Memorias del Desarrollo	Miguel Coyula	Cuba
2011	Ticket to Paradise	Boleto al paraíso	Gerardo Chijona	Cuba
2012	Distance	Distancia	Sergio Ramírez	Guatemala
2013	Rat Fever	Febre do Rato	Claudio Assis	Brazil
2014	Behavior	Conducta	Ernesto Daranas	Cuba
2015	Refugiado	—N/a	Diego Lerman	Argentina
2016	Magallanes	—N/a	Salvador del Solar	Peru
2017	Last Days in Havana	Últimos días en La Habana	Fernando Pérez	Cuba
2018	Joaquim	—N/a	Marcelo Gomes	Brazil
2019	Retablo	—N/a	Alvaro Delgado-Aparicio	Peru
2021	Memories of My Father	El olvido que seremos	Fernando Trueba	Colombia
2022	Tales of One More Day	Cuentos de un día más	Fernando Pérez, Rosa María Rodríguez, Alán González, Carolina Fernández Vega-Charadán, Yoel Infante, Katherine T. Gavilán, Sheyla Pool, Eduardo Eimil	Cuba
2024	Heroic	Heroico	David Zonana	Mexico; Sweden

=== Best Director ===
Year	Director(s)	English film title	Original film title	Country
2010	Rafi Mercado	Lie	Miente	Puerto Rico
2011	Fabián Hofman	I Miss You	Te extraño	Argentina
2012	Sergio Ramírez	Distance	Distancia	Guatemala
2013	Fernando Lavanderos	Things as They Are	Las Cosas Como Son	Chile
2014	Diego Quemada-Díez	The Golden Dream	La jaula de oro	Mexico
2015	Arturo Sotto Diaz	Havana's Boccaccio	Boccaccerías habaneras	Cuba
2016	Santiago Mitre	Paulina	La patota	Argentina
2017	José María Cabral	Woodpeckers	Carpinteros	Dominican Republic
2018	Marcelo Gomes	Joaquim	—N/a	Brazil
2019	Alejandro Gil	Innocence	Inocencia	Cuba
2021	Ángeles Cruz	Nudo Mixteco	—N/a	Mexico
2022	Diego Lerman	The Substitute	El Suplente	Argentina
2024	Carolina Marcowikz	Toll	Pedágio	Brazil

=== Best Screenplay ===
Year	Screenwriter(s)	English film title	Original film title	Country
2010	Ray Figueroa	The Warehouse	La bodega	Guatemala
2011	Diana Cardozo	I Miss You	Te extraño	Argentina
2011	Beatriz Novaro, Marina Stavenhagen	Two Girls... One Road	Viaje redondo	Mexico
2012	Marco Dutra, Juliana Rojas	Hard Labor	Trabalhar Cansa	Brazil
2013	Eliseo Subiela	Vanishing Landscapes	Paisajes devorados	Argentina
2014	Carlos Lechuga	Molasses	Melaza	Cuba
2015	Arturo Sotto Diaz	Havana's Boccaccio	Boccaccerías habaneras	Cuba
2016	Pavel Giroud, Alejandro Brugués, Pierre Edelman	The Companion	El acompañante	Cuba
2017	Daniel Hendler, Alberto Rojas Apel	The Candidate	El candidato	Argentina; Uruguay
2018	Ernesto Daranas, Marta Daranas	Sergio & Sergei	Sergio & Serguei	Cuba
2019	Ana Katz	Florianópolis Dream	Sueño Florianópolis	Argentina; Brazil
2021	Ana Katz, Gonzalo Delgado	The Dog Who Wouldn't Be Quiet	El perro que no calla	Argentina
2022	Natalia Cabral, Oriol Estrada, Javier García Lerín	A Film About Couples	Una película sobre parejas	Dominican Republic
2024	Josué Méndez	The Monroy Affaire	El caso Monroy	Peru; Argentina

=== Best Actor ===
Year	Actor	English film title	Original film title	Country
2014	Reynaldo Miravalles	Esther Somewhere	Esther en alguna parte	Cuba
2015	Néstor Guzzini, Hector Noguera	Mr. Kaplan	—N/a	Uruguay
2016	Luis Gnecco	The Church of Karadima	El Bosque de Karadima	Chile
2017	Jorge Martinez	Last Days in Havana	Últimos días en La Habana	Cuba
2018	Miguel Ángel Solá	The Last Suit	El último traje	Argentina
2019	Sergio Prina	The Snatch Thief	El Motoarrebatador	Argentina
2021	Eduardo Cabrera	1991	—N/a	Guatemala
2022	Roberto Quijano	Love & Mathematics	Amor y matemáticas	Mexico
2024	Jhon Narváez	Rebellion	Rebelión	Colombia; Argentina; United States

=== Best Actress ===
Year	Actress	English film title	Original film title	Country
2014	Alina Rodríguez	Behavior	Conducta	Cuba
2015	Isabel Santos	His Wedding Dress	Vestido de novia	Cuba
2016	Dolores Fonzi	Paulina	La patota	Argentina
2017	Isabel Santos	Ya no es antes	—N/a	Cuba
2018	Antonia Zegers	Los Perros	—N/a	Chile
2019	Marleyda Soto	Los silencios	—N/a	Brazil; Colombia; France
2021	Gabriela Ramos	Is That You?	¿Eres tú, papá?	United Kingdom; Cuba
2022	Bárbara Colen	Fogaréu	—N/a	Brazil
2024	Lola Amores	A Night with the Rolling Stones	Una noche con los Rolling Stones	Cuba; Nicaragua

=== Best Documentary ===
Year	English title	Original title	Director(s)	Country
2011	Operation Peter Pan: Flying Back to Cuba	—N/a	Estela Bravo	Cuba
2012	With My Heart in Yambo	Con mi corazón en Yambo	María Fernanda Restrepo	Ecuador
2013	Sibila	—N/a	Teresa Arredondo	Chile; France Peru
2014	Of Kites and Borders	De cometas y fronteras	Yolanda Pividal	Mexico United States
2015	Another Island	Otra Isla	Heidi Hassan	Cuba; Spain
2016	The Pawn	La Prenda	Jean-Cosme Delaloye	Guatemala Switzerland
2018	Filiberto	—N/a	Freddie Marrero	Puerto Rico Venezuela
2019	Away from Meaning	Lejos del sentido	Olivia Luengas	Mexico
2021	Cuban Dancer	—N/a	Roberto Salinas	Chile
2022	Alis	—N/a	Nicolas van Hemelryck, Clare Weiskopf	Colombia
2024	Transfariana	—N/a	Joris Lachaise	France; Colombia

== See also ==
- Havana Film Festival
- The Ludwig Foundation of Cuba
