= Edesio Alejandro =

Cuban composer of electronic music (1958–2025)

- Edesio Alejandro, c. 1988
- Born: Edesio Alejandro Rodríguez Salva; August 28, 1958; Havana, Cuba
- Died: March 5, 2025 (aged 66); Alcalá de Henares, Spain
- Citizenship: Cuba; Spain
- Occupations: Guitarist; singer; composer
- Children: 1
- Awards: National Music Prize of Cuba

Edesio Alejandro Rodríguez Salvá (March 28, 1958 – March 5, 2025) was a Cuban and Spanish guitarist, singer and composer of electronic music. He wrote incidental music, music for television and more than 50 film scores such as Clandestinos and Hello Hemingway, as well as concert pieces. His works were often experimental, using synthesizers; they were influenced by rock music and Cuban music fusioned with genres such as rap and hip-hop. Some works combined actors, dancers and musicians in unusual line-ups.

== Life and career ==
Alejandro was born in Havana on March 28, 1958. He studied guitar, piano and music theory at the conservatory with Clara Nicola, graduating in 1967. He studied further, composition, orchestral conducting and electronic music at the Instituto Superior de Arte with Juan Blanco and Leo Brouwer. He also studied with Jorge García Porrúa and Juan Blanco.

He worked in ensembles, participating in competitions, and also as arranger and music director. His 1987 rock opera Violente was considered the first rock opera in Latin America. He developed an Afro-Cuban style, compared to Jean Michel Jarre for using synthesizers, soloists and orchestras in different formats. His band, active since 1988, had an eclectic and innovative sound, using Cuban styles such as rumba and conga in fusion with foreign genres such as rap, funk, soul, and hip-hop.

Alejandro played in South America, Canada, and Europe. His albums Orisha Dreams and Black Angel were among the first 100 of World Music in Europe in 1999. Blen Blen, from the CD Black Angel, was first place for several weeks in the MTV Europe Dance Floor Charts.

He received the Caracol Award from the National Union of Writers and Artists of Cuba several times, for the best soundtrack of a short film in 1988 for El desayuno más caro del mundo, for the best featured soundtrack in 1989 for Clandestinos, and for best soundtrack in 1995 for Madagascar. In 1990, he received the soundtrack award at the Film, Video and Television Festival of Trieste for Hello Hemingway. Kleines Tropicana achieved the Award for best Cuban music at the International Festival of New Latin American Cinema in Havana in 1997, and also the award for best 35mm feature film music at the Latin American and Brazilian Film Festival in Gramado in 1998. At the Havana festival of 2003, Suite Habana achieved the awards for Best Film Soundtrack and Best Film Music, the Gonzalo Roig Award for the best Cuban work composed for film, and the 2004 soundtrack award at the Trieste festival. Alejandro was nominated for a Latin Grammy in 2010 for 100 sones cubanos in the category Best Traditional Tropical Album, and for a Grammy for the same album in 2011. In 2013, he was accepted as a member of the Academy of Arts and Cinematographic Sciences of Spain. He also became a member of the Academy of Motion Picture Arts and Sciences in the United States. He was awarded the National Music Prize of Cuba in 2020.

=== Personal life ===
Alejandro was married to Idolka de Erviti; they had a son, Cristian.

In 2021, Alejandro and his wife moved to Alcalá de Henares, Spain, to seek treatment for prostate cancer. He naturalized as a Spanish citizen.

Alejandro died from cancer at a hospital in Alcalá de Henares, on March 5, 2025, at the age of 66.

== Filmography ==
Alejandro composed scores for more than 50 films. He often collaborated with director Fernando Pérez.

His films include:

1983

- El desastre del Barcástegui (documentary).

1987

- Clandestinos. Dir. Fernando Pérez.

1988

- Octubre del 67 (documentary). Dir. Chávez.
- El desayuno más caro del mundo (documentary). Dir. Gerardo Chijona.

1989

- Dribleando (animated). Dir. Mario García-Montes.
- El caballito de los dos nombres (animated). Dir. García-Montes.
- La vida en rosa (with Manuel Eugenio). Dir. Rolando Díaz.

1990

- Detrás del espejo. (CM.).
- El hombre y su aventura (documentary).
- Caravana. Dir. Rogelio París, Julio C. Rodríguez.
- Hello Hemingway. (LM. Ficc.). Dir. Pérez.
- La crin de Venus. Dir. Diego Rodríguez Arché.

1991

- Adorables mentiras (LM. Ficc.). Dir. Gerardo Chijona.
- El amor se acaba. (CM.).

1992

- El triángulo (Adorable Lies). (CM.). Dir. Chávez.
- La bobocracia. (Dibujo Animado). Dir. Elisa Rivas.

1993

- Sosa Bravo en dos tiempos (documentary).
- Solo nosotros los dinosaurios. (CM.).
- El largo viaje de Rústico (documentary). Dir. Díaz.

1994

- Madagascar. (Ficc.). Dir. Pérez.

1995

- De Fresa y Chocolate a Guantanamera (documentary). Dir. Chávez.
- Del otro lado del cristal (documentary). Dir. Guillermo Centeno.

1996

- Blue Moon. Dir. Fernando Timossi D..
- El Sardinas. (CM.). Dir. Manuel A. Rodríguez.

1997

- Kleines Tropicana. (LM. Ficc.). Dir. Díaz.

1998

- La vida es silbar (Life is to Whistle). (LM. Ficc.). Dir. Pérez.

1999

- Como los dioses (documentary). Dir. Lázaro Buría.

2000

- Hacerse el sueco. (con Gerardo García). Dir. Díaz.

2001

- Nada (Nothing more). (LM. Ficc.). Dir. Juan Carlos Cremata.

2002

- Suite Habana. (LM. Ficc.). Dir. Pérez.

2003

- Viviendo al límite (documentary). Dir. Belkis Vega.
- Perfecto amor equivocado. (LM. Ficc.). Dir. Gerardo Chijona.

2004

- Bailando Cha Cha Cha. (with Ernesto Cisneros). Dir. Manuel Herrera.
- Tres veces dos. (Cuento: Lila). Dir. Lester Hamlet.

2005

- Un Rey en La Habana. (LM. Ficc.). Dir. Alexis Valdés.

2007

- Madrigal. Dir. Pérez.

2008

- Kangamba. Dir. Rogelio Paris.

2009

- Marti el ojo del canariol. Dir. Pérez.

2010

- Boleto al paraiso. (LM. Ficc.). Dir. Gerardo Chijona.

2017

- Los buenos demonios. Dir. Daniel Díaz Torres.

2020

- Mambo Man. Dir. Mo Fini.
