= Adorable Lies =

1992 film directed by Gerardo Chijona

- Film poster
- Directed by: Gerardo Chijona
- Written by: Gerardo Chijona
- Starring: Luis Alberto Garcia
- Release date: 27 March 1992 (US)
- Running time: 100 minutes
- Country: Cuba
- Language: Spanish

Adorable Lies (Spanish: Adorables mentiras) is a 1992 Cuban comedy film directed by Gerardo Chijona. The film was selected as the Cuban entry for the Best Foreign Language Film at the 65th Academy Awards, but was not accepted as a nominee.

Adorable Lies was the final film of Silvia Planas.

== Cast ==
- Luis Alberto García
- Mirtha Ibarra
- Isabel Santos
- Thais Valdes

== See also ==
- List of submissions to the 65th Academy Awards for Best Foreign Language Film
- List of Cuban submissions for the Academy Award for Best Foreign Language Film
