= Hello Hemingway =

- Theatrical release poster
- Directed by: Fernando Pérez
- Screenplay by: Mayda Royero
- Produced by: Ricardo Ávila
- Starring: Laura de la Uz, Raúl Paz, José Antonio Rodríguez, Martha del Río, Herminia Sánchez
- Cinematography: Julio Valdés
- Edited by: Jorge Abello
- Music by: Edesio Alejandro
- Production company: ICAIC
- Release date: December 1990
- Running time: 90 minutes
- Country: Cuba
- Language: Spanish

Hello Hemingway is a 1990 Cuban drama film directed by Fernando Pérez and starring Laura de la Uz. The plot, set in Havana in 1956, near the end of Fulgencio Batista's dictatorship, follows a young girl whose aspirations to obtain a scholarship in America against all odds are paralleled by her reading of Ernest Hemingway's The Old Man and the Sea. The film was selected as the Cuban entry for the Best Foreign Language Film at the 64th Academy Awards, but was not designated a nominee.

== Plot ==
In 1956, sixteen-year-old Larita lives with her mother and her aunt's family in a ramshackle house outside Havana. From their garden they can see Ernest Hemingway's white mansion. At home, she adorns her walls with pictures of Elvis Presley and Tony Curtis, while at school she excels in her English class. Larita is delighted when her teacher suggests that she enter a competition for a scholarship to attend university in the United States. Larita also happily dates a classmate, Victor, who is trying to establish a student association.

On a visit to a bookshop, she is given a copy of Hemingway's The Old Man and the Sea, which she starts to read avidly, drawing parallels between the novel and her own life which she records in her diary. At home, her family tease her about her academic aspirations. They resent the fact that while they work hard she studies and contributes nothing to their meager existence. The issue of finances becomes more acute when Larita is sent home from school because she is not wearing the correct uniform. However, she passes the first round of scholarship exams and is invited to a reception for the finalists. She makes herself as presentable as possible with the help of her relatives' sewing skills and the support of her grandmother, who pawns her treasured earrings to purchase fabric. She tells Victor that she has been shortlisted for the scholarship, which makes him angry because she has kept it a secret from him and is preparing to go abroad and abandon him for a year. That night Larita returns home to find that her uncle, whose salary was the family's principal means of support, has been fired from his job as a policeman.

At the scholarship interview, her chances appear to be hampered by the fact that she is illegitimate and does not have the right social connections to provide her with letters of recommendation. In desperation, Larita decides to visit Hemingway to see if he will write a reference for her, but she discovers he is away in Africa. Larita bitterly blames her mother for the fact that she is disadvantaged by poverty and illegitimacy. When she stays home from school pretending to be sick, her favorite teacher, Dr. Martinez, visits her and offers encouragement. To Larita's complaints about her poverty she says: "You're not exactly living under a bridge." Meanwhile, at school, the student protests climax, the student association tries to get students to boycott classes, and Victor is arrested.

Later that year, Larita takes a job at a coffee bar. One evening near Easter the scholarship administrator walks by and recognizes her. They establish that they recognize one another, but nothing else is said except the simplest wish from the administrator that Larita enjoy the holiday.

== Cast ==
- Laura de la Uz as Larita
- Raúl Paz as Victor
- José Antonio Rodríguez as Tomás
- Herminia Sánchez as Josefa
- Micheline Calvert as Miss Amalia
- Marta del Rio as Doctor Martínez
- Wendy Guerra as Estela

== Home media ==
The film was released on DVD in the USA in April 2002. The film is in Spanish with English subtitles.

== See also ==
- List of submissions to the 64th Academy Awards for Best Foreign Language Film
- List of Cuban submissions for the Academy Award for Best Foreign Language Film
