= Clandestinos (1987 film) =

Clandestinos is a 1987 Cuban film directed by Fernando Pérez. The film chronicles the last days of the revolutionary struggle against Fulgencio Batista in Cuba as seen via the romance between two clandestine fighters who work on an underground printing press used to print subversive pamphlets against Batista's rule.

== Critical reception ==
Clandestinos received considerable critical and popular attention in Cuba following its release. Cuban film scholar and critic José Antonio Évora discussed the film in Cuba Internacional in 1987, while contemporary coverage also appeared in Bohemia, Juventud Rebelde, Cine Guía, among other Cuban publications. Later assessments have emphasized the film's combination of conventional narrative storytelling with a carefully controlled visual style. ENDAC characterizes Clandestinos as a particularly accomplished debut, praising its dramatic construction, emotional effectiveness and formal consistency. The assessment argues that the film's strength lies not in experimentation but in Pérez's command of the classical elements of filmmaking, describing it as a notably accomplished Cuban film of its period. The film's final sequence, in particular, has acquired a lasting reputation in Cuban film criticism. In an interview published by the Havana Glasgow Film Festival, Luis Alberto García said that, decades after the film's release, Cuban critics continued to regard the sequence involving his character and Nereida, played by Isabel Santos, as one of the most memorable endings in Cuban cinema. The film has subsequently been regarded as one of the significant works of late-1980s Cuban cinema. A survey of the best films produced by the ICAIC, published by Hypermedia Magazine, placed Clandestinos among the leading Cuban films selected by specialists, ranking it in the second group of the survey's top twenty titles. The film has also been included in retrospective assessments by the Cinemateca de Cuba. In a ranking of significant ICAIC productions, Clandestinos was included among the institution's selected fiction films, alongside works such as Memories of Underdevelopment, Lucía, La muerte de un burócrata, La primera carga al machete and Aventuras de Juan Quin Quin.

International critics and film scholars have also emphasized the film's combination of political history, romance, and genre filmmaking. The DEFA Film Library at the University of Massachusetts Amherst describes Clandestinos as one of the most "Hollywood"-like and commercially successful Cuban films, characterizing it as a tense, action-oriented political thriller. Film scholar Ann Marie Stock has similarly characterized the film as "part heroic epic and part political thriller" and identified it as one of the most popular Cuban films. Lauren Peña's entry on Clandestinos in A Cuban Cinema Companion, an English-language scholarly reference work published by Rowman & Littlefield, emphasizes the film's deliberate distinction between historical events and fictional characters. Peña notes that the opening title identifies the film as inspired by events between 1956 and 1958 while explicitly presenting its characters and actions as fictional. She also discusses Pérez's use of revolutionary history, romance, and the experiences of young clandestine activists as the basis for the film's narrative. The film has continued to receive positive retrospective attention in the United States. Cuban film historian Luciano Castillo, in an interview with The Criterion Collection, singled out Clandestinos as one of the works that helped establish Fernando Pérez as an important Cuban filmmaker, observing after a later screening at the Havana Film Festival in New York that the film "seems to get better with every passing year."

== Cast ==
- Luis Alberto García
- Isabel Santos
- Amado del Pino
- Susana Pérez
- Otniel Gonzalez

== Awards ==
- Best Actress (Isabel Santos) - Havana Film Festival.

== See also ==
- List of Cuban films
