= Claudia Alvariño Díaz =

Cuban actress

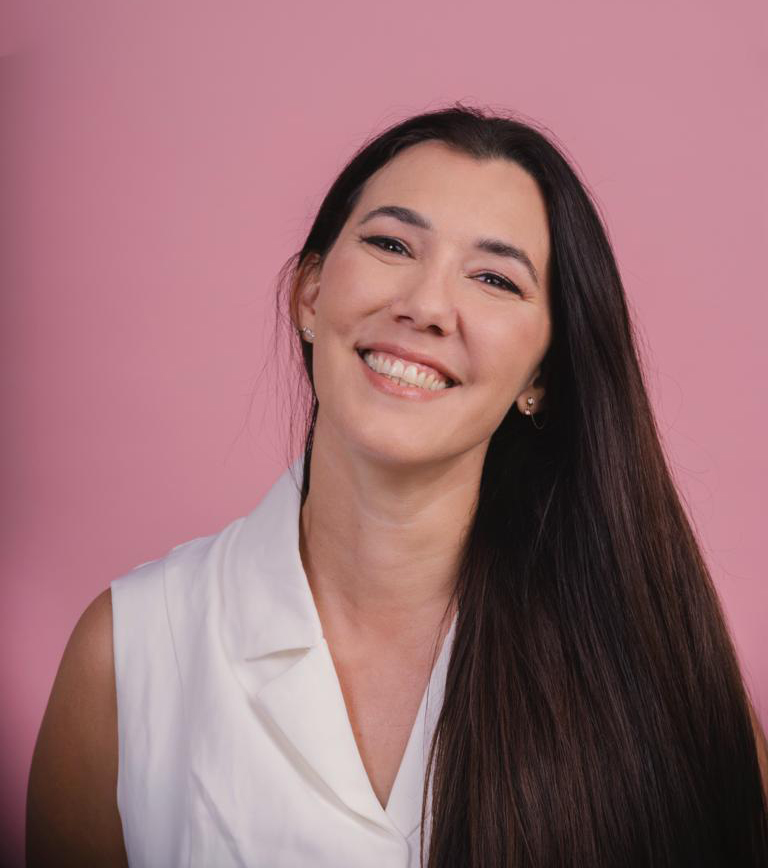
- Alvariño in 2023
- Born: Claudia Alvariño Díaz; 29 December 1987 (age 37); Havana, Cuba
- Other names: Muma
- Education: National Arts Schools of Cuba; Instituto Superior de Arte
- Occupation: artist
- Years active: 1993–present
- Children: 2

Claudia Alvariño Díaz (born 29 December 1987), also known as Muma, is a Cuban film, theater and television actress.

== Career ==
During her childhood, Claudia's training as an actress was influenced by her older half-sister on her father's side: the Cuban actress Tahimí Alvariño. Claudia grew up watching her sister in movies, soap operas and plays. Since she was little, Tahimí took her to parties with her friends, all actors and musicians. According to Claudia in an interview, she was the center of attention imitating a very popular comedian who had a characteristic voice. About that period of her life Claudia has said that she felt very proud to be his sister but she was always clear, even as a child, that the things she would achieve or do in the artistic world would be through her own efforts, not by being the sister. by Tahimí Alvariño. She even went to castings without saying anything to her, in her own words "because I never wanted the name to influence any decision, and I'm very happy to say after all these years that I achieved that and that she always respected me too."

Alvariño began her artistic life at the age of 6 when she joined the children's theater company called La Colmenita, under the direction of Carlos Alberto Cremata. When she turned 15 she went on to study acting at the National Arts Schools and upon graduating in 2006 she returned to La Colmenita to do her social service, subsequently remaining there, where she is currently the deputy director of the company. At the same time, she completed her university studies at the Instituto Superior de Arte.

Alvariño gained further recognition among the Cuban public when she played the character of the teacher in the film Habanastation (2011) directed by Ian Padrón. A little earlier, Padrón visited the headquarters of La Colmenita with the script for the film, with the idea that if the directors of the theater company liked it, they could help him in the production of the film. The idea behind the story was popular, so they began casting with children for the main characters. Finally Alvariño was selected for what at the time was a very small role as a teacher. But later, in the editing room, her role was modified and began to grow in importance as scenes were added, which is what finally appeared on screen. For this film she was nominated for the Llauradó Awards for best female performance. She also won the recognition for Best Female Performance awarded by the Young Directors Showcase in Havana. The film also won the Founders prize Best of Fest in the Founders awards category at the Traverse City Film Festival in Michigan, United States; where it was presented by the American director Michael Moore, who highlighted that Habanastation is a very universal feature film due to the human values it exposes.

Following the launch of Habanastation, Alvariño has said: "I am a little afraid of popularity and right now that the film has come out, they look at you differently on the street. It is as if they are constantly subjecting you to an exam" and that that It made her feel "sometimes a little self-conscious."

Alvariño also lent her voice as narrator of the documentary called Esencias, La Colmenita en Estados Unidos, by Cuban director Roberto Chile and released in January 2012, which includes the highlights of the tour carried out by La Colmenita in the United States through the cities of Washington D.C., New York and San Francisco in which schools, squares and theaters of those cities learned part of the work of La Colmenita.

In 2012, she was part of the film La Pared de las Palabras by director Fernando Pérez.

In 2021, during the COVID-19 pandemic, Alvariño took part, together with the repentista, writer and poet Alexis Díaz-Pimienta, in the creation of the project called Chamaquili and the pandemic to raise awareness among the Cuban public about the epidemiological situation that the country was experiencing. About this project she said: “In the midst of this confinement and the need to create, to feel useful, it occurred to me to write to this talented and enthusiastic friend who is Alexis. I asked him if he hadn't thought of something about the pandemic, indiscipline, hygiene care, etc., but Chamaquili said: I encouraged him to write a little text for Lucas, my oldest child, who is 5 years old. So it was!; Instead of a text, it ended up being a book of more than 50 pages!”

Alvariño has also expressed that she is passionate about directing. Together with Alexis Díaz-Pimienta and La Colmenita, she aspires to bring to television, like the Chamaquili project, a series based on a book by Díaz-Pimienta himself called Piel de noche. At the same time, she has declared that La Colmenita's projects do not stop, including the launch of the first book on the history of the children's theater company.

== Personal life ==
Alvariño is the mother of two children named Lucas and Ana Lucía. Regarding the differences of working professionally in film, theater and television, Alvariño considers that each of these performing arts has its charm and that it is very difficult for her to choose just one, but that she has been able to enjoy working in each of these performing mediums. As she said: "Theatre has the pleasure of connecting with the public and there is no repetition, like television or cinema; if something does not go well, you have to resolve it in the moment and it is an adrenaline rush that I enjoy a lot. But cinema undoubtedly me passion and I would love to do it again.

Alvariño has also gained notoriety for being the best friend of actress Ana de Armas. They both met when they were studying at the National Arts Schools of Cuba and currently they usually celebrate Christmas and New Year's Eve together as well as spend summers together in Cuba or other countries. Alvariño frequently supports de Armas through her social networks, as she always posts about her latest projects in Hollywood. The friendship of both actresses became better known when in April 2023 de Armas traveled to Cuba to celebrate her 35th birthday and Alvariño posted a video on her Instagram profile in which she received de Armas and businessman Paul Boukadakis at the José Martí International Airport in Havana where they both hug.
