= Wendy Guerra =

Cuban writer

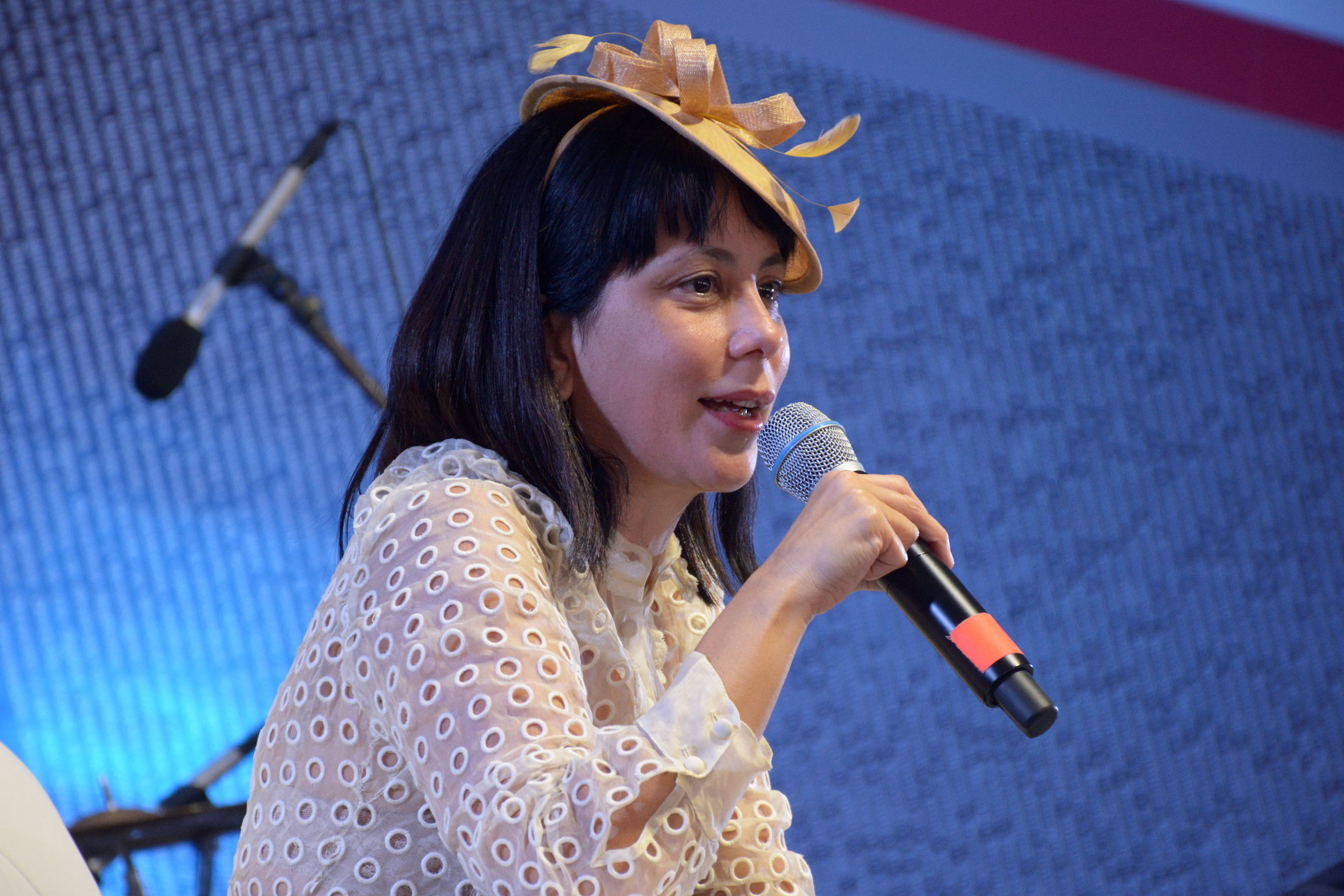
- Born: 11 December 1970 (age 55); Havana, Cuba
- Occupation: Writer
- Writing career
- Language: Spanish
- Genres: Poetry, novel

Wendy Guerra (born 11 December 1970), formally Wendy Guerra Torres, is a Cuban poet and novelist, based in Miami.

After a brief career acting in Cuban film and television, she turned to writing and won recognition more readily abroad than within Cuba. She has been described as "a kind of diva of contemporary Cuban literature".

Three of her books have been published in Cuba: Platea a oscuras (poetry, Havana: Universidad de La Habana, 1987), Cabeza rapada (poetry. Havana: Letras Cubanas, 1996) and Posar desnuda en La Habana (Havana: Letras Cubanas, 2014).

== Biography ==
Guerra was born on 11 December 1970 in Havana in what she later described as "a small provincial hospital". Her family soon moved to Cienfuegos on Cuba's southern coast. Her mother Albis Torres was an unpublished poet. Her father was Cuban playwright Raúl Guerra, who died alcoholic and begging for alms on the streets. She has a half brother, plastic artist Sandro Guerra García.

Guerra's first collection of poems, Platea a oscuras, won her the prize "13 de marzo", published in Havana (Cuba) in 1987.

She then earned a degree in film, radio and television direction at Havana's Instituto Superior de Arte. She appeared on Cuba's first morning television show, Buenos Días, where she read children's stories. She worked as an actress on Cuban television and in film, but considers her abilities limited, though she found the experience useful as a student of character and interpretation. Her film credits include Hello Hemingway (1990).

She kept diaries that formed the basis for her first novel, Todos se van (Everyone Leaves), which was published in Spain. The novel follows its young protagonist through childhood and adolescence in Cuba. The novel was adapted into the screenplay for a film directed by the Colombian Sergio Cabrera. Cabrera shot the film in Cuba and was later screened at the Havana Film Festival.

Guerra published her novel Posar desnuda en la Habana (Posing Nude in Havana) in 2012, after conducted research in Havana and Paris and read Nin's unexpurgated diaries. In the novel, extracts from Nin's diaries are interwoven with fictional entries. In 2014 the novel was presented in Cuba (Alejo Carpentier room, La Cabaña Fortress) during the 23rd Havana's International Book Fair.

In 2013, she published Negra in Spain, a first person narrative of racial discrimination in post-Revolutionary Cuban society.

In 2016, Guerra published Domingo de Revolución (Revolution Sunday) in Spain, the story of a Cuban author who publishes a book of poems in Europe and is the object of suspicion by both the Cuban government and Cuban dissidents.

Guerra's writing has appeared in such magazines as Encuentro, La gaceta de Cuba, and Nexos, as well as in magazines devoted to the visual arts. She has been a guest lecturer at Princeton University and Dartmouth College. Her works have been translated into several languages.

She is married to jazz pianist Ernán López-Nussa.

After residing in Chile, she settled in Miami, as part of the Cuban exiled community, where she began working as an alternative content creator for CNN en Español in 2021.

== Awards and honours ==
She received the Carbet des Lycéens prize (Prix Carbet des lycéens) in 2009. In 2010, France named her a Chevalier of the Ordre des Arts et des Lettres.

== Selected works ==
=== Poetry ===
- Platea a oscuras (Havana: Universidad de La Habana, 1987)
- Cabeza rapada (Havana: Letras Cubanas, 1996)
- Ropa interior (Bruguera, 2009)
  - A Cage Within (Harbor Mountain Press, 2013); translated by Elizabeth Polli

=== Novels ===
- Todos se van (Everyone's Leaving) (Barcelona: Bruguera, 2006)
  - Everyone Leaves (2013); translated by Achy Obejas
- Nunca fui primera dama (I was never the grand dame) (Barcelona: Bruguera, 2008)
- Posar desnuda en La Habana (Posing Nude in Havana); Alfaguara (2012), Havana: Letras Cubanas (2013)
- Negra (Editorial Anagrama, 2014)
- Domingo de Revolución (Anagrama, 2016)
  - Revolution Sunday (2018); translated by Achy Obejas
