= Think of Me (film) =

1996 film

- Film poster
- Directed by: Arturo Sotto Díaz
- Written by: Arturo Sotto Díaz
- Starring: Fernando Hechevarria
- Release date: 1996
- Running time: 87 minutes
- Country: Cuba
- Language: Spanish

Think of Me (Spanish: Pon tu pensamiento en mí) is a 1996 Cuban drama film written and directed by Arturo Sotto Díaz. The film was selected as the Cuban entry for the Best Foreign Language Film at the 69th Academy Awards, but was not accepted as a nominee.

== Cast ==
- Fernando Hechevarria
- Osvaldo Doimeadios
- Susana Perez
- Carlos Acosta-Milian
- Jorge Alí
- Rubén Breñas
- Óscar Bringas
- Micheline Calvert
- Juan Cepero

== See also ==
- List of submissions to the 69th Academy Awards for Best Foreign Language Film
- List of Cuban submissions for the Academy Award for Best Foreign Language Film
