= With My Heart in Yambo =

2011 film

- Directed by: María Fernanda Restrepo
- Written by: María Fernanda Restrepo
- Release date: 14 October 2011
- Running time: 135 minutes
- Country: Ecuador
- Language: Spanish

With My Heart in Yambo (Spanish: Con mi corazón en Yambo) is a 2011 Ecuadorian documentary film written and directed by María Fernanda Restrepo. The film documents the abduction of Restrepo's two brothers in 1988. In 2012 it won the Havana Star Prize for Best Documentary at the Havana Film Festival New York.
