= Guantanamera (film) =

1995 Cuban film

- Directed by: Tomás Gutiérrez Alea; Juan Carlos Tabío
- Screenplay by: Eliseo Alberto
- Starring: Carlos Cruz; Mirta Ibarra; Jorge Perugorría; Raúl Eguren
- Music by: José Nieto
- Release date: 1995
- Country: Cuba
- Language: Spanish

Guantanamera is a 1995 comedy film from Cuba, directed by Tomás Gutiérrez Alea and Juan Carlos Tabío, featuring an ensemble cast. Eliseo Alberto wrote the screenplay. The film was produced by Camilo Vives.

== Synopsis ==
When Aunt Yoyita dies during a visit to Gina in Guantánamo, Gina, along with Yoyita's childhood sweetheart, the aging Cándido, must take the body to Havana. To their annoyance, Gina's overbearing husband Adolfo, a punctilious undertaker with political ambitions, takes charge of the journey, including several transfers along the way between hearses.

On the road, they keep crossing paths with Mariano, a playboy trucker with a woman at every way station. He and Gina recognize each other: he was her student and wrote her of how much he loved her, then dropped out of school in embarrassment. Before they reach Havana, Gina realizes she can choose between Adolfo and Mariano.

Besides being a romantic comedy, the film is noted for depicting life in Cuba during the "Special Period" of the 1990s, a period of relative poverty for Cuba following the termination of Soviet aid to the country. The male protagonist, for example, was an engineer under the Soviet-supported regime, and now makes a living as a truck driver.

As the film progresses, the audience including Cándido encounter a little girl dressed in black who follows the characters through their journey. She is known in Santeria as "Iku" or the grim reaper. Making brief appearances a possible death is about to occur.

== Cast ==
- Mirta Ibarra ... Gina
- Carlos Cruz ... Adolfo
- Jorge Perugorría ... Mariano
- Conchita Brando ... Yoyita
- Raúl Eguren ... Cándido
- Pedro Fernández ... Ramon
- Suset Pérez Malberti ... Iku

The film is named after the song Guantanamera ("girl from Guantánamo") – perhaps the best known Cuban song and that country's most noted patriotic song.

It was Gutiérrez's last film.

== See also ==
- List of Cuban films
