= Un rey en la Habana =

- DVD release cover
- Directed by: Alexis Valdés
- Written by: Alexis Valdés
- Produced by: Pancho Casal; José María García
- Starring: Alexis Valdés
- Music by: Edesio Alejandro
- Distributed by: Iroko Films; Continental Producciones; Imagia Freelance; Cubaname
- Release date: 25 April 2005
- Running time: 95 minutes
- Country: Spain
- Language: Spanish

Un rey en la Habana (A King in Havana) is a 2005 film directed and written by Alexis Valdés and starring Alexis Valdés.

== Plot ==
Papito is a young actor grown up in "El Mamey", the most dangerous marginal district of La Habana, which he dreams to leave someday along with his small theater group. Don Arturo arrives in Cuba full of promises and souvenirs. But the millionaire does not last more than 24 hours. During his first "encounter" with Yoli he dies from a cardiac arrest because of overdose of sexual enhancement drug. In the family the panic spreads: They have lost the great opportunity that was going to let them out of the misery. When Papito thinks that nothing could go worse, he receives an "order" from "La Caimana". He must be taken for dead, travel with Yuri to Spain and get all the Euros he can. In spite of the danger and the threats, Papito thinks it's an opportunity to make amends with his love and accepts the treatment. In order to escape the confusion, Papito will have to make the best out of his talent and benefit from his double identity.

== Cast ==
- Alexis Valdés (Papito/Don Arturo)
- José Téllez (Yuri)
- Yoima Valdés (Yoli)
- Alicia Bustamante (La Caimana)
- José Alias (Pistolita)
- Manuel de Blas (Cayetano)
- Anthony Blake (El Mago)
- Antonio Dechent (Chano)
- María Isabel Díaz (La Gorda)
- Paulina Gálvez (Gabriela)
- Carmen Machi (Estrella)
- Manuel Manquiña (Police officer)

Leonel Valdes (actor) was never mentioned in the cast. He interpreted a very important role in the film. This film was one of his latest incursion in the film industry.

== Trivia ==
- The pork served at the reception for Yoli and Papito's wedding was from Don Arturo's body. When some suspicious guests mention that it tastes funny, La Caimana replies "It's from a Spanish Pig".

== See also ==
- Alexis Valdés
- Cuban Spanish
