= Arévalo (comedian) =

Spanish comedian and actor (1947–2024)

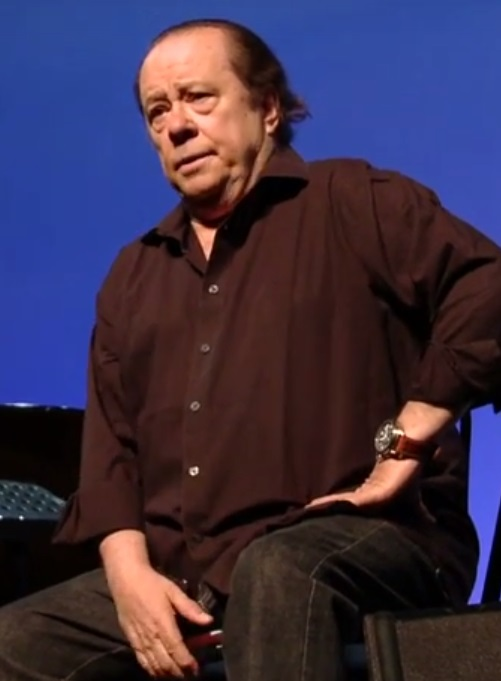
Arévalo in 2014

Francisco Rodríguez Iglesias (2 September 1947 – 3 January 2024), better known as Arévalo, was a Spanish comedian and actor.

== Life and career ==
Arévalo was raised in Catarroja, Valencia, and his first performances date back to 1970 in which he portrayed a comedic bullfighter. His filmography includes Moscow Gold and Isi & Disi: High Voltage (2006).

Arévalo was specially famous during the 1970s and early 1980s for his jokes about "gangosos y mariquitas" (people with nasal voice and homosexuals) that were sold in cassettes in petrol stations around Spain. His brand of humor eventually took a nosedive, and "to look like an Arévalo joke" became a generic expression meaning "a type of grotesque and stale humor that is difficult to tolerate".

== Death ==
Arévalo was found dead at his home in Valencia, on 3 January 2024, at the age of 76.
