= Moscow Gold (film) =

- Theatrical release poster
- Spanish: El oro de Moscú
- Directed by: Jesús Bonilla
- Screenplay by: Joaquín Andújar; Jesús Bonilla
- Produced by: Enrique Cerezo
- Starring: Jesús Bonilla; Santiago Segura; Antonio Resines; Concha Velasco; Alfredo Landa; Gabino Diego; Neus Asensi; María Barranco; Alexis Valdés
- Cinematography: Javier Salmones
- Edited by: Pablo Blanco
- Music by: Manuel Villalta
- Production companies: Enrique Cerezo PC; Arriábala; Amiguetes Entertainment
- Distributed by: Columbia TriStar Films de España
- Release date: 28 March 2003
- Country: Spain
- Language: Spanish

Moscow Gold (Spanish: El oro de Moscú) is a 2003 Spanish comedy film directed by Jesús Bonilla (in his directorial debut feature) which stars Bonilla and Santiago Segura.

== Plot ==
Based upon the premise that the so-called Moscow Gold never left Spain, the plot follows the mishaps of a troupe of ragtags and freaks who step in to seize the "hoard".

== Cast ==
- Jesús Bonilla as Pedro "Papeles" Aparicio
- Santiago Segura as Íñigo Fuentes
- Antonio Resines as Jacinto
- Concha Velasco as Pastora Bernal
- Alfredo Landa as Faustino Peláez
- Gabino Diego as Macintosh
- Neus Asensi as Gloria
- María Barranco as Alejandra
- Alexis Valdés as Vladimir
- José Luis López Vázquez as Beltrán
- Chiquito de la Calzada
- Juan Luis Galiardo
- Andrés Pajares
- Jorge Sanz
- El Gran Wyoming
- Carlos Latre
- Florentino Fernández
- Antonio Gamero
- Sancho Gracia
- Arévalo

== Production ==
The film is an Enrique Cerezo PC, Amiguetes Entertainment, and Arriábala production. It boasted a €2.7 million budget.

== Release ==
The film was released theatrically on 28 March 2023. It grossed €1.44 million (298,000 admissions) in its opening weekend. It proved to be one of the largest commercial successes at the Spanish box office of 2003, with over 1.5 million admissions.

== Reception ==
Jonathan Holland of Variety assessed that the film cannot be saved from its "hackneyed script".

Jordi Batlle Caminal of Fotogramas rated the film 2 out of 5 stars, pointing out that Bonilla "lacks the freshness of Segura, Monzón and Fesser, not to mention the sharpness of Berlanga".

== See also ==
- List of Spanish films of 2003
