= Vertical Love =

1997 film

- Directed by: Arturo Sotto Díaz
- Written by: Arturo Sotto Díaz
- Starring: Jorge Perugorría
- Release date: 10 September 1997 (TIFF)
- Running time: 100 minutes
- Country: Cuba
- Language: Spanish

Vertical Love (Spanish: Amor vertical) is a 1997 Cuban comedy film written and directed by Arturo Sotto Díaz. The film was selected as the Cuban entry for the Best Foreign Language Film at the 70th Academy Awards, but was not accepted as a nominee.

== Cast ==
- Jorge Perugorría as Ernesto Navarro Aces
- Sílvia Águila as Estela Diaz Iglesias
- Susana Pérez as Lucia
- Manuel Porto as Faustino
- Aramís Delgado as Tio Carlos
- Vicente Revuelta as Abuelo

== See also ==
- List of submissions to the 70th Academy Awards for Best Foreign Language Film
- List of Cuban submissions for the Academy Award for Best Foreign Language Film
