= A Successful Man =

1985 film

- Film poster
- Directed by: Humberto Solás
- Written by: Humberto Solás; Juan Iglesias
- Produced by: Humberto Hernández
- Starring: César Évora
- Cinematography: Livio Delgado
- Edited by: Nelson Rodríguez
- Release date: December 1986 (Havana Film Festival)
- Running time: 116 minutes
- Country: Cuba
- Language: Spanish

A Successful Man (Spanish: Un hombre de éxito) is a 1986 Cuban drama film directed by Humberto Solás. It was screened in the Un Certain Regard section at the 1987 Cannes Film Festival and it was entered into the 15th Moscow International Film Festival. It won Best Production Design and Grand Coral - First Prize in the 1986 Havana Film Festival. The film was selected as the Cuban entry for the Best Foreign Language Film at the 60th Academy Awards, but was not accepted as a nominee.

== Plot ==
The film portrays three decades in the life of an affluent Cuban. Javier Argüelles, an opportunistic young man from Cuban middle class, survives all kind of political changes in Havana, from 1932 to 1959, while his brother Darío is persecuted and killed because of his leftist ideas.

== Cast ==
- César Évora - Javier Argüelles
- Raquel Revuelta - Raquel
- Daisy Granados - Rita
- Jorge Trinchet - Darío Argüelles
- Rubens de Falco - Iriarte
- Mabel Roch - Ileana Ponce
- Carlos Cruz - Puig
- Miguel Navarro - Lucilo
- Omar Valdés - Facundo Lara
- Ángel Espasande - Father Rubén
- Ángel Toraño - Ponce
- Isabel Moreno - Berta
- Nieves Riovalles - Darío's wife
- Jorge Alí - Baseball player
- Denise Patarra - Puig's girlfriend
- Max Álvarez - Priest
- Niola Montes - Mrs. Ponce
- Orlando Contreras - Darío's friend

== See also ==
- List of Cuban films
- List of submissions to the 60th Academy Awards for Best Foreign Language Film
- List of Cuban submissions for the Academy Award for Best Foreign Language Film
