= Life Is to Whistle =

1998 Cuban film

- Directed by: Fernando Pérez
- Written by: Fernando Pérez; Humberto Jimenez
- Starring: Luis Alberto García; Isabel Santos; Claudia Rojas
- Music by: Edesio Alejandro
- Distributed by: ICAIC
- Release date: 1998 (Cuba)
- Running time: 110 minutes
- Country: Cuba
- Language: Spanish

Life Is to Whistle (Spanish: La vida es silbar) is a 1998 Cuban film directed and co-written by Fernando Pérez

== Plot synopsis ==
The film tells the stories of three end-of-the millennium Cubans, whose lives intersect on the Day of Santa Barbara (the African Saint Chango, ruler of destinies). Mariana, a ballerina, ponders breaking chastity vows she made to land the coveted role of Giselle; Julia has fainting spells each time she hears the word "sex," and Elpidio, a musician, seduces a gringa tourist while Bebe, the narrator, takes the viewer for a taxi ride along the streets of Havana.

=== Accolades ===
Life is to Whistle won the Grand Coral at the Havana Film Festival in 1998.

== See also ==
- List of Cuban films
