= Things as They Are (film) =

- Film poster
- Directed by: Fernando Lavanderos
- Written by: Fernando Lavanderos, Rodrigo Ossandón, Gonzalo Verdugo
- Produced by: Paulo Parra, Nayra Ilic, Pablo Sierralta
- Starring: Cristóbal Palma, Ragni Orsal Skogsrod, Isaac Arriagada, José Miguel Barros
- Cinematography: Andrés Garcés
- Edited by: Fernando Lavanderos, Galut Alarcón, Rodrigo Saquel
- Music by: Sebastián Vergara
- Distributed by: Invercine Producciones Limitada
- Release dates: 19 November 2012 (Mar del Plata Film Festival); 8 August 2013 (Chile)
- Running time: 90 minutes
- Country: Chile
- Language: Spanish

Things as They Are (Spanish: Las cosas como son) is a 2012 Chilean film directed and written by Fernando Lavanderos and filmed in Santiago, Chile. It premiered in Chile at the 2012 Festival Internacional de Viña del Mar (International Festival of Viña del Mar) and internationally at the Festival Internacional de Cine de Mar del Plata (International Film Festival Mar del Plata) in Argentina.

== Plot ==
The story follows Jerónimo, a solitary, detail-oriented, and meticulous individual who rents out rooms to foreigners in Santiago, Chile's capital, to generate income due to his large family house. Sanna, a young Norwegian doing social work for a non-governmental organization, ends up staying at Jerónimo's house. However, problems arise when Sanna secretly brings a child to the house without consulting him, leading to arguments but ultimately allowing them to get to know each other better. Eventually, Sanna leaves to return to her home country, and Jerónimo goes back to his regular life.

== Cast ==
- Cristóbal Palma
- Ragni Orsal Skogsrod
- Isaac Arriagada
- José Miguel Barros

== Critics ==
The film has been well received by critics. Marcelo Morales of CineChile said: "Things As They Are is not just a good film – it is also the confirmation of a director who has (in very few films, all made freehand with limited resources) established a complete personal voice."

== Awards ==
- Special Jury Prize, Critics Award, International Film Festival of Viña del Mar, 2012.
- Best Film, International Film Festival of Mar del Plata, 2012.
- Chilean Long Competition: Best Ensemble, Festival Cine / / B, 2012.
- Independent Camera Award, Karlovy Vary International Film Festival, Czech Republic, 2013.
- Best Director, Havana Film Festival New York, 2013.

== See also ==
- Cinema of Chile
