= Miente (film) =

2009 film directed by Rafi Mercado

- Film poster
- Directed by: Rafi Mercado
- Written by: Javier Ávila; José Ignacio Valenzuela
- Produced by: Ileana Ciena
- Starring: Maine Anders
- Cinematography: Sonnel Velazquez
- Edited by: Raúl Marchand Sánchez
- Release date: 3 March 2009
- Running time: 94 minutes
- Country: Puerto Rico
- Language: Spanish

Miente is a 2009 Puerto Rican drama film directed by Rafi Mercado, and based on the novel "Different", written by Javier Ávila. The film was selected as the Puerto Rican entry for the Best Foreign Language Film at the 83rd Academy Awards but it did not make the final shortlist. The film won the inaugural Havana Star Prize for Best Director in 2010 at the 11th Havana Film Festival New York.

== Cast ==
- Oscar H. Guerrero - Henry
- Maine Anders - Jane
- Yamil Collazo - Samuel
- Teresa Hernández - Marta
- Eyra Aguero Joubert - Mistress Latipa
- Efraín López Neris - Charlie
- Rafel Perez-Veve - Thief
- Frank Perozo - Diff
- Julio Ramos - Garb - Neighbor
- Mariana Santángelo - Paula
- Carlos Vega - Jimenez

== See also ==
- List of submissions to the 83rd Academy Awards for Best Foreign Language Film
- List of Puerto Rican submissions for the Academy Award for Best Foreign Language Film
