= Barrio Cuba =

2005 film directed by Humberto Solás

- Directed by: Humberto Solás
- Starring: Jorge Perugorría; Isabel Santos
- Release date: November 2005 (Huelva Iberoamerican Film Festival)
- Running time: 105 minutes
- Country: Cuba
- Language: Spanish

Barrio Cuba is a 2005 Cuban drama film directed by Humberto Solás, and starring Jorge Perugorría.

== Cast ==
- Jorge Perugorría
- Isabel Santos
- Mario Limonta
- Adela Legrá
- Luisa María Jiménez
- Rafael Lahera
