= Ernesto Daranas =

Cuban director and screenwriter (born 1961)

Ernesto Daranas Serrano
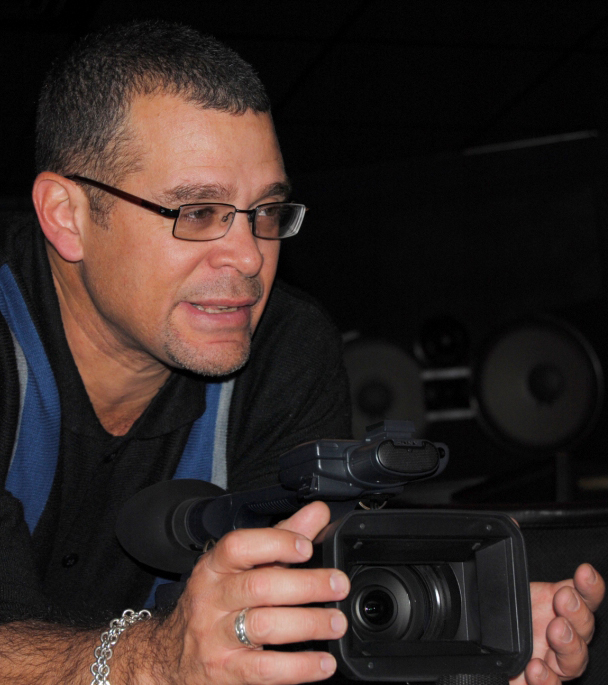
- Daranas in 2010
- Born: December 7, 1961 (age 64); Havana, Cuba
- Occupations: Filmmaker and screenwriter
- Notable work: Sergio & Sergei; Behavior; Fallen Gods; Bluechacha; Los últimos gaiteiros de La Habana

Ernesto Daranas Serrano (born December 7, 1961) is a Cuban filmmaker. Daranas' three feature films have had unprecedented success in Cuba and were submitted to the Academy Award for Best International Feature Film. Daranas is a Latin Grammy nominee for Best Long Form Music Video and a recipient of the King of Spain Award. His filmography includes Sergio & Sergei (2017), starring Ron Perlman, and Behavior, often considered the greatest Cuban film of the 21st century.

== Biography ==
Ernesto Daranas Serrano was born in Havana on December 7, 1961.

His father, Manuel Ángel Daranas Valdés (1934-2000) was an actor, teacher and writer who gained national recognition as the author of the adventure radio series La flecha de cobre (The copper arrow), an audience success that was on the air for nearly a decade in the late 1960s and early 1970s.

Ernesto Daranas' beginnings as a storyteller took place in the radio while still a college student. In 1983, he became a Bachelor in Geography at the Instituto Superior Pedagógico (now University of Educational Sciences).

In the early 90's, Daranas achieved recognition for his radio soap operas addressing contemporary Cuban society in the context of the Special Period.

His directorial debut in television was in 1999–2000 with La tierra más hermosa (The loveliest land), a series of 12 documentaries co-directed with Rolando Almirante. The series explored various aspects of Cuban ethnography, culture, nature and history.

Subsequently, Daranas wrote and/or directed various films for television (see Filmography below) .

In 2004, he wrote and co-directed with Natasha Vázquez Los últimos gaiteiros de La Habana (The last bagpipers of Havana), a documentary about Eduardo Lorenzo, a nonagenarian Galician bagpiper who teaches young Cubans to play the instrument and returns to his native village in Spain after 50 years of absence. This documentary won the Premio Internacional de Periodismo Rey de España (2004 edition), a prestigious Iberoamerican journalism award.

Also in 2004, Daranas wrote and directed the telefilm ¿La vida en rosa?, a comedy about "the false barrier we sometimes raise between purportedly pure art and popular art". It won the Grand Prize and other six awards at the First National Television Festival of Cuba.

Los dioses rotos (Fallen gods) was Daranas' film directorial debut, in 2008. Daranas wrote a story, based on interviews he'd collected through the years, about a university professor who gets involved in the underworld of prostitution and procuring. The film was made thanks to a fund for low budget projects issued by the Ministry of Culture. It was shot in a digital format and later filmed-out.

The film won the Audience Award and the Film Critics Association Award at the 30th Havana Film Festival. It became a box-office hit and the press called it "the biggest audiovisual event in Cuba of recent times" and "one of the best Cuban films after 2000". It was Cuba's entry to the 82nd Academy Awards for Best Foreign Language Film.

In 2012, Daranas wrote and directed Bluechacha, a music EPK for Buena Vista Social Club's Manuel Galbán's last album. Bluechacha was nominated that year to the XIII Latin Grammy Award, in the category of Best Long-Form Music Video.

Arguably, it was Behavior (Conducta), released in 2014, the film that garnered Daranas widespread international recognition.

The film tells the story of Chala, an 11-year-old boy who supports his alcoholic and drug addict mother by breeding pigeons and training fighting dogs. When his loving teacher Carmela falls ill and is temporarily replaced by an inexperienced young teacher, Chala is dispatched to a school for children with behavioral problems.

The film premiered in February 2014 in Havana and then played at the Málaga Film Festival, before having its US premieres simultaneously at the Chicago Latino Film Festival and Havana Film Festival New York in April 2014. Behavior was then screened in the Contemporary World Cinema section at the 2014 Toronto International Film Festival. It was selected as the Cuban entry for the Best Foreign Language Film at the 87th Academy Awards, but was not nominated.

The film went on to be screened in many festivals around the world and won many accolades, including a Goya nomination.

In 2017, Sergio and Sergei was released, a comedy set in Cuba in 1991, describing the vicissitudes in the friendship between a Cuban ham radio enthusiast and a Soviet cosmonaut, trapped in the Mir space station during the USSR collapse.

The film was a co-production between Cuba, Spain and the United States. At the time, the press called it the first Cuba-USA narrative co-production in over 50 years, by virtue of the presence of actor Ron Perlman in the movie and his involvement in its distribution through his indie production company Wing and a Prayer Pictures.

The film was selected as the Cuban entry for the Best Foreign Language Film at the 91st Academy Awards. However, it was not on the final list of submitted films released by Academy of Motion Picture Arts and Sciences in October 2018.

In a poll conducted by Cinema Tropical (the New York-based non-profit media arts organization), both Behavior and Sergio and Sergei were included among the 100 most significant Latin-American films of the 2010-2019 decade.

In 2019, Daranas directed the documentary Natalia, about the noted Cuban ethnographer and writer Natalia Bolívar Aróstegui.

== Filmography ==
=== Feature films ===
Year	Title	Director	Writer
2008	Los dioses rotos	Yes	Yes
2014	Behavior	Yes	Yes
2015	La emboscada	No	Yes
2017	Sergio and Sergei	Yes	Yes

=== Documentaries ===
Year	Title	Director	Writer	Notes
2000	La tierra más hermosa	Yes	Yes	Series of 12 documentaries. Co-directed with Rolando Almirante.
2003	Ana y las cotorras	Yes	Yes	Co-directed with Randol Menéndez.
2004	Los últimos gaiteiros de La Habana	Yes	Yes	Co-directed with Natasha Vázquez. Original idea by Rigoberto Senarega.
2005	Fillas de Galicia	Yes	Yes	Co-directed with Natasha Vázquez.
2009	Peregrinos	Yes	Yes	
2011	2, con Omara y Chucho (Music EPK)	Yes	Yes	
2012	Bluechacha (Music EPK)	Yes	Yes	
2019	Natalia	Yes	Yes	

=== Films for television ===
Year	Title	Director	Writer	Notes
2002	Un cuento de camino	No	Yes	Directed by Paco Anca
2003	El hombre de Venus	Yes	Yes	Co-directed with Charlie Medina.
2003	El otro	No	Yes	Directed by Charlie Medina.
2004	¿La vida en rosa?	Yes	Yes	
2010	Knepp	No	Yes	Adapted screenplay from the play by Jorge Goldenberg. Directed by Charlie Medina.

== See also ==
- Behavior (2014 film)
- Sergio and Sergei (2017 film)
- Cuban cinema
- List of Cuban submissions for the Academy Award for Best International Feature Film
