= Alexis Valdés =

Cuban actor, comedian, and monologist

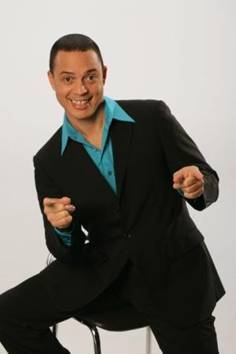
- Born: Alexis Valdés Gutiérrez; August 16, 1963 (age 63); Havana, Cuba
- Education: Polytechnic José Antonio Echeverría
- Known for: Comedy, acting, directing, television, film, theater
- Notable work: Un rey en La Habana (2005); Los pequeños fugitivos; (The Little Fugitives) (1981)
- Spouse: Claudia Valdés
- Website: alexisvaldes.com

Alexis Valdés is a Cuban actor, comedian, monologist, film producer, playwright, poet, singer and screenwriter. He was born in Havana, Cuba, on August 16, 1963.

Valdés holds a degree in thermal engineering from Havana's Polytechnic José Antonio Echeverría. He rose to prominence in the 1980s, for his performance as Bandurria in the Cuban TV series Los pequeños fugitivos (The Little Fugitives). After working in television and theater for 10 years in Cuba, he moved to Spain in 1991, where he became very popular due to his performances in programs like El Club De La Comedia (The Comedy Club). In 2005, he was actor, director and producer of his first film, Un rey en La Habana.

He later moved to Miami, where he broadcast his comedic show Seguro Que Yes on AméricaTeVé until early July 2007, when "Seguro Que Yes" went on hiatus. Since early 2008, his show was transferred from AméricaTeVé to Mega TV Channel 22 and later renamed Esta Noche Tu Night. On December 14, 2011, he launched his second disc, 'Con Cariñito' (With Affection). Since 2013 he has been writing, producing and directing plays with great success in the city of Miami.

== Biography ==
Alexis Valdés was born in Havana, Cuba on August 16, 1963, the son of Caridad Gutiérrez and Leonel Valdés. His father, Leonel, was a renowned Cuban actor. He graduated from the Polytechnic José Antonio Echeverría with a degree in thermal engineering.

He had a daughter named America Valdés on March 1, 2002, and a son named Leonardo Valdés on December 18, 2003. América is often seen singing on her father's official YouTube channel: "Alexis Valdes Real." Valdés' current wife is Claudia Valdés, an actress who often collaborates with her husband on projects. The couple had a daughter in 2018 named Lucía. Valdes studied thermal engineering and his performance in t.v. and theater.He moved to Spain was actor, director, comedic, and productor.Valdes broadcast his comedic in Americateve.

== Career ==
In 1981, Alexis Valdés began working in the Cuban TV show Los pequeños fugitivos, where he played Bandurria, a tragic, yet funny character that captivated Cuban audiences and earned Valdés popular acclaim. Bandurria later inspired some of Valdés' own characters, such as Cristinito, a goofy character who is convinced he is a genius. Cristinito is quite popular in the Cuban and Cuban-American communities.

Over the next decade, Valdés continued to make a name for himself in the Cuban scene, before finally moving to Spain in 1991. Once in Spain, Valdés continued his career mostly as a comedian, performing stand-up in shows such as El Club De La Comedia (The Comedy Club), a popular Spanish show where comedians perform monologues for a live crowd. In 2005, he moved to the United States, where he has worked as a TV host and comedian on shows such as Seguro que yes, Esta noche tu night, and El show de Alexis Valdés. Also in 2005, he wrote and directed his first film, Un rey en La Habana, in which he also starred. Valdés has acted in many other films throughout his career.

In recent years, Valdés has written, acted, and directed numerous plays, such as Oficialmente gay and El juicio del PDO.

== Works ==
- El juicio del PDO (2015)
- Oficialmente Gay 3 (2019)
- Oficialmente Gay 2
- Oficialmente Gay (2014)
- Con Cariñito (2011)
- Un ajuste de cuentas (2006)
- 90 millas (2005)
- Un rey en La Habana (2005)
- El oro de Moscú (2003)
- Clara y Elena (2001)
- Tuno negro (2001)
- Torrente 2: Misión en Marbella (2001)
- Tatawo (2000)
- Salsa (2000)
- París Tombuctú (1999)
- El siglo de las luces (1992)
- María Antonia (1991)
- Amor y medias (1989)
- Los pequeños fugitivos (1981)
- Los Vikingos

Television series

- Casi perfectos as Iván Montenegro.
