= Havana Film Festival =

Annual festival highlighting Latin American filmmakers

- Official 2019 Film Festival poster
- Location: Havana, Cuba
- Founded: 1979
- Awards: Grand Coral Award
- Website: habanafilmfestival.com (in Spanish)

The Havana Film Festival (Spanish: Festival de Cine de La Habana) is a Cuban festival that promotes Latin American filmmakers and films with Latin American themes. The festival is also known in English as International Festival of New Latin American Cinema of Havana, and in Spanish as Festival Internacional del Nuevo Cine Latinoamericano de La Habana. It takes place every December in the city of Havana, Cuba.

== History ==
The inaugural International Festival of New Latin American Cinema was held on December 3, 1979. More than 600 film directors of Latin America responded to the first call made by the Cuban Institute of the Cinematographic Art and Industry (ICAIC). Its founders included ICAIC president Alfredo Guevara, and the filmmakers Julio García Espinosa and Pastor Vega.

As expressed in its founding convocation, the festival aimed to "promote the regular meeting of Latin American filmmakers who with their work enrich the artistic culture of our countries (…); ensure the joint presentation of fiction films, documentaries, cartoons and current events (…), and contribute to the international diffusion and circulation of the main and most significant productions of our cinematographies".

The inaugural festival hosted over 600 filmmakers from across Latin America. Colombian author Gabriel García Márquez as president of the Fiction jury and Cuban filmmaker Santiago Álvarez as president of the jury for Documentaries and Animation. The Coral Grand Prize winners were Colonel Delmiro Gouveia (dir. Geraldo Sarno, Brazil) and Maluala (dir. Sergio Giral, Cuba) in Fiction, The Battle of Chile: the Struggle of a People Without Arms (dir. Patricio Gúzman, Chile) in Documentary, and Elpidio Valdés (dir. Juan Padrón, Cuba) in Animation.

In 2013, following the death of the then-President and co-founder Alfredo Guevara, the Havana Film Festival announced it was reappointing Iván Giroud as President. He had previously served in that position from 1994–2010.

== Awards ==
Within the following categories, approximately 40 awards are given:

- Films
- Documentaries
- Animation
- First Work
- Direction
- Cinematography
- Other awards, including the FIPRESCI prize

== Winners ==
=== Grand Coral Award for Best Film ===
Year	English title	Original title	Director(s)	Country of origin
1979 (s)	Colonel Delmira Gouveia	Coronel Delmiro Gouveia	Geraldo Sarno	Brazil
1979 (s)	Maluala		Sergio Giral	Cuba
1980	Gaijin, a Brazilian Odyssey	Gaijin - Os Caminhos da Liberdade	Tizuka Yamasaki	Brazil
1981	They Don't Wear Black Tie	Eles Não Usam Black-Tie	Leon Hirszman	Brazil
1982	Time for Revenge	Tiempo de Revancha	Adolfo Aristarain	Argentina
1983	Up to Certain Point	Hasta cierto punto	Tomás Gutiérrez Alea	Cuba
1984	Memoirs of Prison	Memórias do Cárcere	Nelson Pereira dos Santos	Brazil
1985 (s)	Frida	Frida, naturaleza viva	Paul Leduc	Mexico
1985 (s)	Tangos, the Exile of Gardel	El exilio de Gardel: Tangos	Fernando Solanas	Argentina
1986	Hour of the Star	A Hora da Estrela	Suzana Amaral	Brazil
1987	A King and His Movie	La película del rey	Carlos Sorín	Argentina
1988	The South	Sur	Fernando Solanas	Argentina
1989	Last Images of the Shipwreck	Últimas imágenes del naufragio	Eliseo Subiela	Argentina
1990	Hello Hemingway		Fernando Pérez	Cuba
1991	Jericho	Jericó	Luis Alberto Lamata	Venezuela
1992	Forbidden Homework	La tarea prohibida	Jaime Humberto Hermosillo	Mexico
1993	Strawberry and Chocolate	Fresa y chocolate	Tomás Gutiérrez Alea and Juan Carlos Tabío	Cuba
1994	The Beginning and the End	Principio y fin	Arturo Ripstein	Mexico
1995	Midaq Alley	El callejón de los milagros	Jorge Fons	Mexico
1996	Deep Crimson	Profundo Carmesí	Arturo Ripstein	Mexico
1997	Martín (Hache)		Adolfo Aristarain	Argentina
1998	Life is to Whistle	La Vida es Silbar	Fernando Pérez	Cuba
1999	Olympic Garage	Garage Olimpo	Marco Bechis	Argentina
2000	Me You Them	Eu Tu Eles	Andrucha Waddington	Brazil
2001	The Swamp	La Ciénaga	Lucrecia Martel	Argentina
2001	90 Miles	90 Millas	Juan Carlos Zaldivar	United States
2002 (s)	City of God	Cidade de Deus	Fernando Meirelles and Kátia Lund	Brazil
2002 (s)	Suddenly	Tan de repente	Diego Lerman	Argentina
2003	Havana Suite	Suite Habana	Fernando Pérez	Cuba
2004	Whisky		Juan Pablo Rebella & Pablo Stoll	Uruguay
2005	Blessed by Fire	Iluminados por el fuego	Tristán Bauer	Argentina
2006	Love for Sale	O Céu de Suely	Karim Aïnouz	Brazil
2007	Silent Light	Stellet Lijcht	Carlos Reygadas	Mexico
2008	Tony Manero		Pablo Larraín	Chile
2009	The Milk of Sorrow	La Teta Asustada	Claudia Llosa	Peru
2010	A Useful Life	La vida útil	Federico Veiroj	Uruguay
2011	Hell	El Infierno	Luis Estrada	Mexico
2012	NO		Pablo Larraín	Chile
2013	Heli		Amat Escalante	Mexico
2014	Behavior	Conducta	Ernesto Daranas	Cuba
2015	The Club	El club	Pablo Larraín	Chile
2016	Desierto		Jonás Cuarón	Mexico
2017	Alanis		Anahí Berneri	Argentina
2018	Birds of Passage	Pájaros de verano	Ciro Guerra and Cristina Gallego	Colombia
2019	The Sleepwalkers	Los sonámbulos	Paula Hernández	Argentina
2021	Pacified	Pacificado	Paxton Winters	Brazil
2022	The Great Movement	El gran movimiento	Kiro Russo	Bolivia
2023	Tótem	Tótem	Lila Aviles	Mexico
2024	La cocina	La cocina	Alonso Ruizpalacios	Mexico
2025	A Poet	Un poeta	Simon Mesa Soto	Colombia

== Awards by nation ==
Argentina	12
Mexico	11
Brazil	9
Cuba	7
Chile	3
Uruguay	2
Colombia	2
Peru	1
United States	1
Venezuela	1
Bolivia	1

== See also ==
- Cartagena Film Festival
- Guadalajara International Film Festival
- Havana Film Festival New York
- Huelva Ibero American Film Festival
- Lima Film Festival
- Morelia International Film Festival
- Santiago International Film Festival
- Valdivia International Film Festival
- Viña del Mar International Film Festival
