= Alina Rodríguez =

Cuban actress (1951–2015)

- Born: 4 October 1951; Havana, Cuba
- Died: 27 July 2015 (aged 63); Havana, Cuba
- Occupation: Actress

Alina Rodríguez (4 October 1951 – 27 July 2015, Havana) was a Cuban actress. She acted in films, television series and theater for more than three decades, and became a favorite among audiences and critics. She most notably performed as Regla in the 2000 film Lista de Espera and as the teacher Carmela in the 2014 film Behavior. She received the IFFI Best Actor Award (Female): Silver Peacock Award for her work in Behavior at the 45th International Film Festival of India, as well as the Havana Star Prize for Best Actress at the 15th Havana Film Festival New York. She died on 27 July 2015, at the age of 63.
