= Habanastation =

2011 film

- Film poster
- Directed by: Ian Padrón
- Written by: Felipe Espinet
- Produced by: Noel Alvarez; Ian Padrón
- Starring: Claudia Alvariño Díaz
- Release date: 25 August 2011 (Traverse City Film Festival)
- Running time: 95 minutes
- Country: Cuba
- Language: Spanish

Habanastation is a 2011 Cuban drama film directed by Ian Padrón, and starring Claudia Alvariño Díaz. Filmed in a slum in western Havana, the film addresses inequalities in Cuba through the relationship between two children of different social strata. The film was selected as the Cuban entry for the Best Foreign Language Film at the 84th Academy Awards, but did not make the final shortlist.

== Cast ==
- Claudia Alvariño Díaz as Maestra Claudia
- Rubén Araujo as Compinche del ñato
- Blanca Rosa Blanco as Moraima
- René de la Cruz Jr. as Director de Escuela
- Ernesto Escalona as Mayito
- Pedro Fernández as Chofer de Guagua
- Rigoberto Ferrera as Chofer Almendrón
- Andy Fornanis as Carlos Roqued

== See also ==
- List of submissions to the 84th Academy Awards for Best Foreign Language Film
- List of Cuban submissions for the Academy Award for Best Foreign Language Film
