= Sergio and Sergei =

2017 film

- Film poster
- Directed by: Ernesto Daranas
- Written by: Ernesto Daranas; Marta Daranas
- Produced by: Joel Ortega; Jaume Roures; Ramon Samada
- Starring: Tomás Cao; Héctor Noas; Ron Perlman
- Edited by: J.M. Quevedo González
- Music by: Tom Linden; Micka Luna
- Release dates: 8 September 2017 (TIFF); 11 June 2018 (Cuba)
- Running time: 93 minutes
- Country: Cuba
- Languages: Spanish; Russian; English
- Box office: $23,268

Sergio and Sergei (Spanish: Sergio & Sergei) is a 2017 Cuban drama film directed by Ernesto Daranas. It was selected as the Cuban entry for the Best Foreign Language Film at the 91st Academy Awards. However, it was not on the final list of submitted films released by Academy of Motion Picture Arts and Sciences in October 2018.

== Plot ==
Sergio is a professor of Marxist philosophy at Havana. He is also a radio ham. His Jewish-American contact Peter sends him a modern radio. Through it, Sergio contacts and befriends Sergei, a Soviet cosmonaut on the Mir space station. Meanwhile, in 1991 brings the end of the Soviet Union. Sergei has to wait until the new Russia can rescue him. Sergio endures the hardships of post-Soviet Cuba.

With the help of his balsero (raft building) building neighbor, Sergio distills moonshine and his mother makes cigars, so that his daughter Mariana has milk. Their informer neighbor Ramiro snitches to officer Lía about Sergio's illegalities. Sergei is concerned with the hardships suffered by his family in post-Soviet Russia and threatens to denounce them publicly. Sergio contacts Peter who pressures an FBI acquaintance.

Out of national pride, Russian president Boris Yeltsin orders Sergei's rescue. After the landing, Sergio and Sergei rejoice via radio. In a dreamlike-sequence, Ramiro breaks free of gravity and flies to Mir.

== Cast ==
- Tomás Cao as Sergio, a Cuban professor and radio ham
- Héctor Noas as Sergei Asimov, a Soviet cosmonaut and radio ham
- Ron Perlman as Peter, an American radio ham

== Reception ==
Sergio and Sergei has grossed a worldwide total of $23,268. On review aggregator website Rotten Tomatoes, the film holds an approval rating of 86% based on seven reviews, with an average rating of 5.5/10.

== See also ==
- List of submissions to the 91st Academy Awards for Best Foreign Language Film
- List of Cuban submissions for the Academy Award for Best Foreign Language Film
