= Eliseo Alberto =

Eliseo Alberto de Diego García Marruz (September 10, 1951 – July 31, 2011) was a Cuban-born Mexican writer, novelist, essayist and journalist. His numerous works include the novel Caracol Beach. Alberto was nicknamed Lichi.

== Biography ==
Alberto was born in Arroyo Naranjo, Cuba, on September 10, 1951. His mother was Bella García Marruz. His father, Eliseo Diego, was one of Cuba's best known poets and a member of a well known Havana-based family which included writers, screenwriters and musicians. Alberto's father often held tertulias, or gatherings of writers and other Cuban literary figures, at their home when he was growing up. He worked as a journalist, based in Havana.

Alberto fled into exile in Mexico in 1990. The Cuban government had executed Arnaldo Ochoa and had begun to more strictly persecute writers and other intellectuals during the late 1980s and early 1990s. Nobel laureate Gabriel García Márquez reportedly helped Alberto escape Cuba and find a new home in Mexico City. He became a Mexican citizen in 2000. Alberto never returned to Cuba and spoke of his experiences in exile, "The worse thing about exile is that the places you inhabit don't remind you of anything ... exile becomes your homeland."

Alberto's novels often touched on the themes of Christian morality, including punishment, redemption and forgiveness. He focused much of his attention on characters living in his native city, Havana. Some of his novels set in Havana include La fábula de José (José's Fable) and La eternidad por fin comienza un lunes (Eternity Finally Begins on a Monday), about the life of a lion trainer, Tartufo, who grieves after the death of the lion, named Goldwyn Mayer.

Although known as a novelist, Alberto was also a poet and screenwriter for films and television shows. He worked as a professor at film schools in Cuba, Mexico and the United States, including the Sundance Institute. His credits as a screenwriter included the film Guantanamera.

A fierce critic of Cuba's Communist government, Alberto released a 1997 book criticizing Fidel Castro, entitled Informe contra mi mismo or Dossier Against Myself. In the 1997 book, Alberto revealed that the Cuban government had asked him to spy on his father's tertulias in 1978 while he was serving in the Cuban military. He was also asked to spy on Cuban exiles returning to the country. Alberto spoke about the book at the Miami Book Fair in 1997.

He was awarded the Premio Alfaguara de Novela literary prize for Caracol Beach in 1998. The novel, perhaps his best known work, follows a war veteran living in a fictitious town in Florida who is haunted by visions of a Bengal tiger with wings. Caracol Beach was translated into English for publication in the United States.

Eliseo Alberto died of complications from a kidney transplant, including heart and respiratory failure, in Mexico City on July 31, 2011, at the age of 59. He had been diagnosed with kidney failure in 2009 and received the transplant on July 18, 2011. His funeral was held in Mexico City, while his ashes were returned to Havana.

== Books ==
- La fábula de José (2001), Ed. Alfaguara. ISBN 9788420441818
- Caracol Beach (1998), Ed. Alfaguara. ISBN 9788420483702
- Informe contra mi mismo (1997), Ed. Alfaguara. ISBN 9788420465548
