= Behavior (film) =

2014 film

- Film poster
- Directed by: Ernesto Daranas
- Written by: Ernesto Daranas
- Produced by: Esther Masero, Isabel Prendes, Danilo León, Joel Ortega, Adriana Moya
- Starring: Alina Rodríguez; Armando Valdés Freire
- Cinematography: Alejandro Pérez
- Edited by: Pedro Suárez
- Music by: Juan Antonio Leyva; Magda Rosa Galbán
- Production companies: Ministerio de Cultura; Instituto Cubano del Arte y la Industria Cinematográficos; RTV Comercial
- Distributed by: Latido Films
- Release date: January 2014
- Running time: 108 minutes
- Country: Cuba
- Language: Spanish

Behavior (Spanish: Conducta) is a 2014 Cuban drama film directed by Ernesto Daranas. In English writing, the film is usually referred to by the title Behavior. The film premiered in February 2014, and played at the Málaga Film Festival before having its US premieres simultaneously at the Chicago Latino Film Festival and Havana Film Festival New York in April 2014. Behavior was then screened in the Contemporary World Cinema section at the 2014 Toronto International Film Festival. It was selected as the Cuban entry for the Best Foreign Language Film at the 87th Academy Awards, but was not nominated.

== Cast ==
- Armando Valdés Freire as Chala
- Alina Rodríguez as Carmela
- Silvia Águila as Raquel
- Yuliet Cruz as Sonia (Chala's mother)
- Armando Miguel Gómez as Ignacio
- Amaly Junco as Yeni
- Miriel Cejas as Marta (substitute teacher)
- Idalmis García as Mercedes (school principal)
- Tomás Cao as Carlos (re-education school principal)
- Héctor Noas as Pablo (Yeni's father)
- Aramís Delgado as Consultant
- Yoan Angarica as Yoan (Chala's friend)
- Richard Andrade as Richard (Chala's friend)
- Cristian Guerra as Niño (Chala's rival)
- Roxana Pérez as María Paula (Yeni's friend)
- Roque Moreno as Policeman
- Anniet Forte as Mirta

== Reception ==
In Cuba, reception was very favorable, from the audience as well from the critics. One critic commented: "With packed cinema halls and long lines to get tickets, [Behaviour's] exhibition cycle promises to be long and could be of greater impact if the country didn't have more of 85% of its cinema halls closed down or destroyed."

The movie kindled an intense social debate and even the Ministry of Education eventually promoted its discussion in the schools. In several interviews, Daranas stated: "The educational system is just a pretext [in the film] to talk about issues which are inherent to most official institutions and not just in Cuba. Carmela's classroom is a counterpoint to the state of things – perhaps a parable of a possible Cuba, a space were differences are respected, where everybody's opinion counts and common sense rises above the handlings of bureaucrats and politics."

Howard Feinstein, from Screen Daily, said: "In a film that has taken Cuba by storm and is in the midst of a streak of overseas awards, former documentarian Daranas smoothly pulls together dual journeys that might not otherwise intersect so credibly. […] Reception should be positive, with such pluses as first-rate performances, especially Daranas's brilliant work with children, and an inventive script outweighing a few rough technical edges."

Daniel Grivel, from Ciné-Feuilles, said: "Excellent in his direction of actors and with a fraternal gaze on his countrymen, Ernesto Daranas makes us the gift of a moving and positive tale."

Dennis Harvey, in his review for Variety, said: "Daranas' direction tamps down the script's implicit moralizing and melodramatic elements by playing everything in an agreeably low-key, naturalistic tenor."

Stephen Holden, from The New York Times, said: "The children, their teachers and their parents represent a lively cross-section of contemporary Cuban society."

John DeFore, from Hollywood Reporter, commented: "Daranas' screenplay is sufficiently focused on the daily hassles of life in Cuba that uncertainties over the characters' fates rarely loom large enough to feel like plot devices; similarly, none of the performances seems calculated to draw our sympathy away from other characters. […] Some cast members' performances would look considerably better with just one or two adjustments to reaction shots; and administrative wrangling over Carmela's job goes on long enough that it threatens to throw the film's balance off. If it's uneven, though, the film benefits from its restrained portrayal of the tenderness between Chala and Carmela, who care for each other when family members who should cannot."

== Awards ==
At the Málaga Spanish Film Festival, Behavior won the awards in the Latin American section for best film, best director, and best actress (Alina Rodriguez), as well as the audience award in that section.

The film won the Havana Star Prize for Best Film at the 15th Havana Film Festival New York, with Alina Rodriguez winning for Best Actress.

At the Lima Film Festival in August 2014, Behavior won the Audience Prize. Alina Rodríguez received the IFFI Best Actor Award (Female): Silver Peacock Award at the 45th International Film Festival of India. At the Brasilia International Film Festival in August/September 2014, Behavior won the prize for best script.

In 2015, Behavior won The Golden Slipper Award for the Best Feature Film for Youth, as well as the International Ecumenical Jury Prize at the Zlín Film Festival.

The film won awards at two of the most important European festivals with children juries: at the Giffoni Film Festival (Italy) in 2014, it won the Gryphon Award for Best Feature Film in the Generator +13 section. At the SCHLINGEL International Film Festival in 2014, Behavior won the Junior Film Award and the FIPRESCI Award.

The film was selected, by a commission of the Cuban Film Institute, to be Cuba's official submission for the Academy Awards (United States) and the Goya Awards (Spain). While not shortlisted for the Oscar, Behavior did secure a nomination for the Goya Award for Best Latin American Film, but the award went to Damián Szifron's Wild Tales.

The film was also nominated for 8 categories at the Platino Awards (Ibero-American cinema) and received a nomination for Best Ibero-American Film at the Ariel Awards (Mexico).

== See also ==
- List of submissions to the 87th Academy Awards for Best Foreign Language Film
- List of Cuban submissions for the Academy Award for Best Foreign Language Film
