= Humberto Solás =

Cuban film director

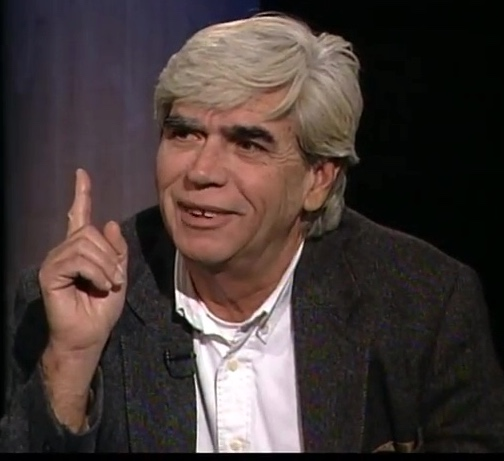
- Solás on CUNY TV's Charlando con Cervantes, 1996
- Born: 4 December 1941; Havana, Cuba
- Died: 17 September 2008 (aged 66); Havana, Cuba
- Occupation: Film director
- Years active: 1959-2008

Humberto Bárbaro Solás Borrego (4 December 1941 – 17 September 2008) was a Cuban film director. Most known for Lucía (1968), which explored the lives of Cuban women during different periods in Cuban history.

== Career ==
Solás cinematic style borrows from Luchino Visconti's mise en scene and is permeated by sometimes heavy melodrama. He started making shorts at a very young age and directed his first medium length film Manuela in 1967. The success of this film led him to direct Lucía, told in three stories from three different moments of Cuban history, each seen through the eyes of a different woman named Lucia.

Solás won 13 awards for filmmaking and has been nominated for an additional nine. His 1968 film Lucía won the Golden Prize and the Prix FIPRESCI at the 6th Moscow International Film Festival. His 1985 film A Successful Man was entered into the 15th Moscow International Film Festival.

In 1977 he was a member of the jury at the 10th Moscow International Film Festival. He served on the jury twice at the Berlin International Film Festival, in 1977 and 1997. In 2003, he founded Gibara's Poor Cinema Festival, "open to filmmakers with limited funds". Solás was awarded Cuba's National Film Prize in 2005.

Humberto Solás died of cancer on September 17, 2008, at the age of 66.

== Filmography ==
Solás directed twenty-four films, from La Huida in 1959 to Barrio Cuba and Adela in 2005, wrote twelve and produced one. The following is an incomplete filmography:

- 1958: La Huida
- 1963: El refrato (short)
- 1964: El Acoso (short)
- 1967: Manuela
- 1968: Lucía
- 1972: Un dia de noviembre
- 1975: Cantata de Chile
- 1981: Cecilia
- 1986: Un hombre de exito
- 1991: El siglo de las Luces
- 2001: Miel para Oshún
- 2005: Barrio Cuba
- 2005: Adela
