= Isabel Santos =

Portuguese politician (born 1968)

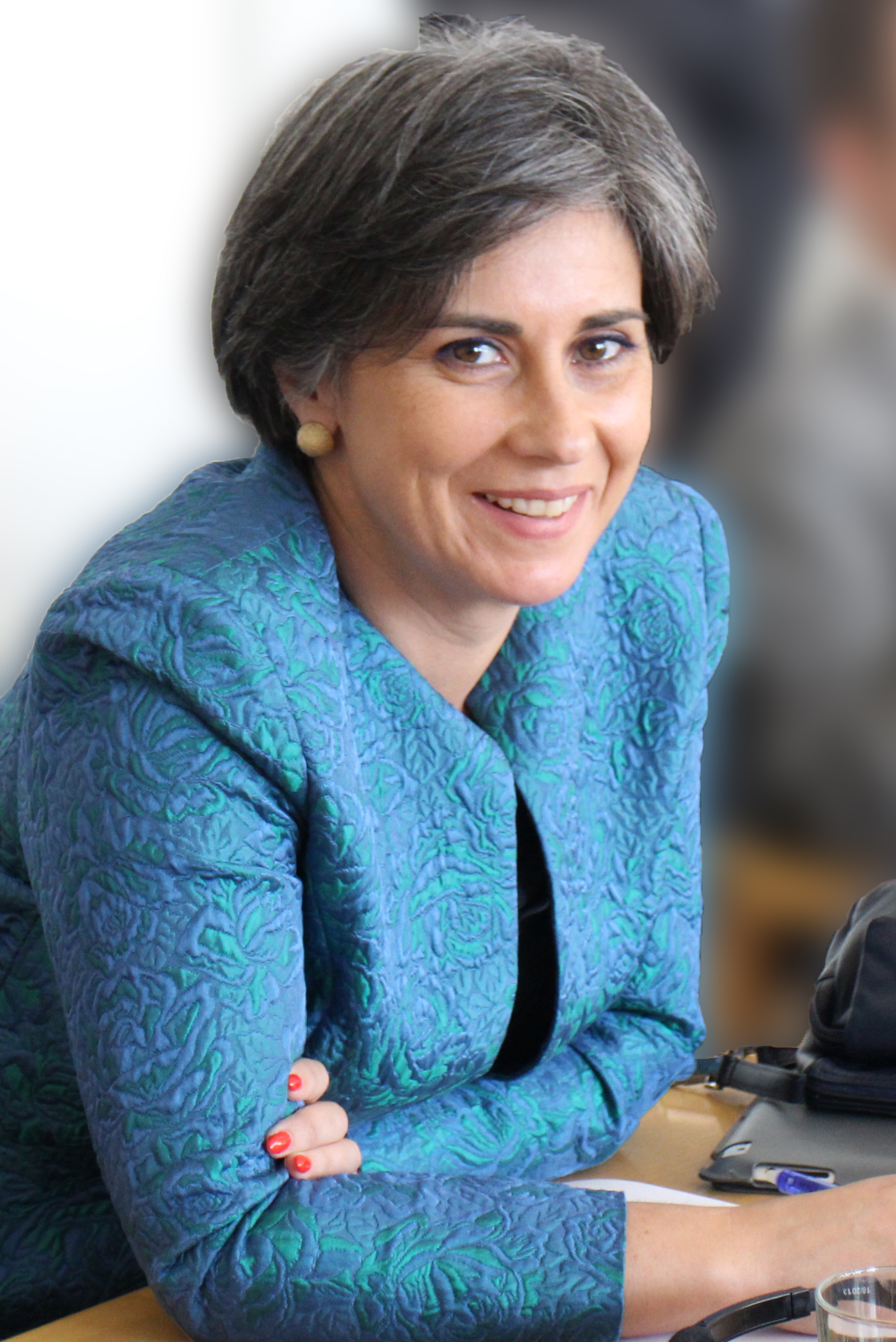

Member of the European Parliament for Portugal
- In office 1 July 2019 – 15 July 2024

Member of the Assembly of the Republic
- In office 23 October 2015 – 2019
- In office 10 March 2005 – 20 June 2011
- Constituency: Porto

Personal details
- Born: Maria Isabel Coelho Santos; 12 February 1968 (age 58) Valbom, Gondomar, Porto District, Portugal
- Party: Socialist Party
- Parents: Joaquim Fernando dos Anjos Coelho (father); Maria Adelina Cardoso Coelho (mother)
- Education: University of Porto
- Occupation: Politician
- Profession: civil servant

Maria Isabel Coelho Santos (born 12 February 1968) is a Portuguese politician of the Socialist Party who was a Member of the European Parliament.

== Political career ==
=== Member of the Portuguese Parliament ===
Santos was a member of the Assembly of the Republic from 2015 until 2019 and from 2005 until 2011. During her time in parliament, she served on the Committee on Foreign Affairs.

In addition to her committee assignments, Santos was a member of the Portuguese delegation to the Parliamentary Assembly of the Organization for Security and Co-operation in Europe. In this capacity, she served as the Assembly's vice-chair and led several election monitoring missions, including for the 2017 elections in Germany and the 2018 midterm elections in the United States.

=== Member of the European Parliament ===
Since becoming a Member of the European Parliament, Santos has been serving on the Committee on Foreign Affairs and of its Subcommittee on Human Rights. She is also a member of the Democracy Support and Election Coordination Group (DEG), which oversees the Parliament's election observation missions.

In addition to her committee assignments, Santos chairs the parliament's delegation for relations with the Mashriq countries and is a member of the delegation to the Euro-Latin American Parliamentary Assembly. She is also part of the European Parliament Intergroup on Anti-Racism and Diversity and the European Parliament Intergroup on LGBT Rights.

== Other activities ==
- Fight Impunity, Member of the Honorary Board (–2022)
