= Suite Habana =

2003 film

- Directed by: Fernando Pérez
- Written by: Fernando Pérez
- Starring: Francisco Cardet
- Music by: Edesio Alejandro
- Distributed by: ICAIC (Cuba); Cinema Tropical (U.S.)
- Release date: 2003
- Running time: 80 minutes
- Country: Cuba
- Language: Spanish

Suite Habana is a 2003 Cuban documentary directed and written by Fernando Pérez.

The documentary was filmed with fictional cinema techniques depicting a day in a life of thirteen real people, from a ten-year-old child with Down syndrome to a 79-year-old lady who sells peanuts in the street.

The film has no dialogue, using sound and image to evoke emotional effect. Several stories are juxtaposed to convey the plot points, an unusual approach in Cuban cinema, where spoken words are often used extensively.

== Critical reception ==
After the film's premiere in Cuba, national critics ranked it as one of the best Cuban films in decades. The film gathered several awards at international film festivals. Variety called it "A lyrical, meticulously crafted and unexpectedly melancholy homage to the battered but resilient inhabitants of a battered but resilient city."

== Awards ==
Fernando Perez receiving the Grand Coral at the Havana Film Festival

HAVANA FILM FESTIVAL - 2003

- Best Director
- Best Music
- Best Sound
- Best Film Poster
- FIPRESCI prize
- Grand Coral - First Prize

UPEC Cultural Circle Award

Goya Awards (Spanish Academy Awards) - 2004

- Candidate to the Best Spanish Language Foreign Film (Mejor Película Extranjera de Habla Hispana)

Gramado Film Festival - 2004

- Kikito Critics Prize
- Special Jury Award

Donostia-San Sebastián International Film Festival - 2003

- SIGNIS Award

Cuban Press Association Award
El Mégano Award

- for its courageous vision of Havana's daily life and its artistic and powerful use of images and sounds

Glauber Rocha Award

Martin Luther King Memorial Center Award

== See also ==
- List of Cuban films
