= Cuban Institute of Cinematographic Art and Industry =

Cuban film organization

ICAIC
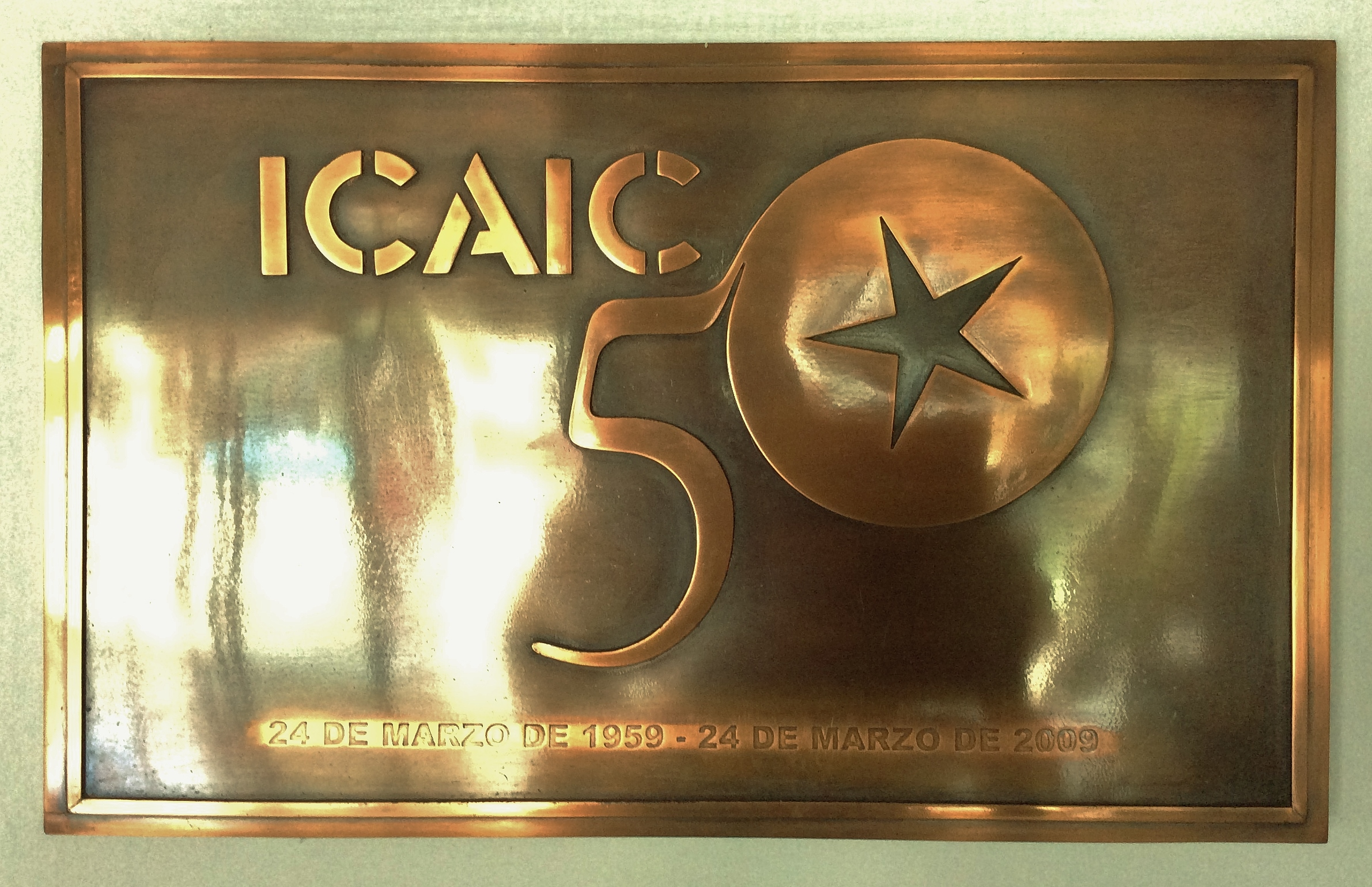
- ICAIC logo for its 50th anniversary
- Industry: cinematography
- Founded: 1959
- Founder: José Massip
- Headquarters: Cuba

The Cuban Institute of Cinematographic Art and Industry (ICAIC, Instituto Cubano del Arte e Industria Cinematográficos) was established by the Cuban government in March 1959 after the Cuban Revolution. Its prominent members are Sara Gómez, Tomás Gutiérrez Alea, Julio García Espinosa, Alfredo Guevara and Santiago Álvarez.

The ICAIC is an organization of the film industry to produce, distribute and exhibit films and related work following the Cuban Revolution. Its aim is to use film as a powerful mass communication medium to mobilize and educate people, improve the quality of Cuba films with appreciation among the masses and reach a wide public. Through educating the new generation of young directors, one of its responsibilities is to transform Cuba from a country of cinematic consumption to one of production.

== History of the ICAIC ==
=== The creation of the ICAIC ===
Following the success of the Cuban Revolution in 1959, the new Cuban government viewed the film industry as an instrument of social change. Cuba prioritized film as a communications strategy to build revolutionary culture. The Cuban government invested substantial funds for public investment in both film production and film exhibition. These efforts led to the creation of the Cuban Institute of Cinematographic Art and Industry (ICAIC). Under the conception of ICAIC “cinema is an art”, and cinema constitutes “an instrument of opinion and formation of individual and collective consciousness”.

=== In the 1960s ===
Due to some institutions established before ICAIC, they organized workshops to train technicians. These institutions include the Film Department at Havana University, Sociedad Cultural "Nuestro Tiempo" (Cultural Society "Our Times") and the Catholic Center of Cinematographic Orientation (CCOC). Therefore, Cuba's film industry did not lack skilled technicians, but it lacked experienced directors. Tomás Gutiérrez Alea and Julio García Espinosa were the only two main directors in Cuba in the 1960s, so the international program for educating young directors became indispensable. ICAIC sent trainee directors to work as assistants in France, Italy, East Germany, and elsewhere. Working as an assistant helped trainees learn basic filmmaking skills and become more comfortable with directing.

In 1960, Cine Cubano, the ICAIC’s film journal, was published. It includes films, interviews, filmographies, and movie plots. They put education into powerful words. Cine Cubano invites all people to submit their writings, share their opinions on the films, as well as teach their critical thinking. Beyond subsidies from the government, ICAIC receives a lot of sponsorships from Cine Cubano. Thanks to these sponsorships, the ICAIC has money to spend on financing films, training filmmakers and educating audiences.

Due to the U.S. monopolization, ICAIC only produced about eight or nine features in a year. After that, the US trade embargo made Hollywood films less accessible to Cuba. To keep Cuba's theaters in business, the ICAIC imported a large number of movies from France, Italy, Japan, and other countries.

=== In the 1970s ===
Cuba continues in a circle of underdevelopment. The communist Castro government focused on agricultural development, especially in sugar production, in 1969, which was called the Year of the Decisive Effort. The aim was to produce a ten-million-ton sugar harvest in 1970, which it failed to achieve. Due to the sugar production project, the government tightened the control on subsidizing the ICAIC. Therefore, Cuba cinema entered a "gray period" in the 1970s. ICAIC suffered many problems such as limited financial and technical resources. The number of audiences who were willing to go to the theaters decreased due to the growth of television in the 1970s. Compared to the very productive period of the 1960s, an overall decline in quality exists in the 1970s. During that decade, some of the young directors trained abroad returned to Cuba and contributed to the Cuban film industry after training. Although the films were not extraordinary, it helped maintain the Cuban film industry. In 1979, ICAIC establishes International Festival of the New Latin American in Havana. This festival is to celebrate Latin American cinema by gathering outstanding directors, producers and people who contributes to Latin American's film industry. Moreover, it is to bring world attention to cinema from Cuba and the rest of Latin America.

=== In the 1980s ===
Cuba in the 1980s had not fully escaped the economic legacy of its past. Despite the economic influence, the passion of the ICAIC on education through cinema did not decline. ICAIC started working on international coproduction with Spain and the Soviet Union. During the 1980s, ICAIC has changed the organization structure and formed a separate office only for exhibition and associated activities for educating people. Also, the Escuela International de Cine y Televisión (International School of Film and Television) got founded by the ICAIC in 1986. Active directors, editors, producers, sound technicians, and other experts from around the world have been invited to this school to share their experience. EICTV helps the way for new modes of producing and distributing films, which prepares elites for new generation. Those changes point out that the ICAIC is devoted to educate people and draw people’s attention by organizing activities.

=== The "Special Period" (1990–1995) ===
The collapse of the Soviet Union put Cuba into a crisis because the United States embargo of Cuba had resulted in heavy Cuban reliance on trading partners in COMECON, which dissolved in 1991. People in Cuba suffered from daily shortages such as electricity blackouts, severe gasoline rationing, huge cuts in public transportation, and bicycles from China. Filmmakers, artists and intellectuals suffered the same consequence as everyone else. ICAIC only completed three features in 1990. At 1991, due to the economic crisis, it also led people to escape the island.

The “Special Period" resulted in a drastic reduction in resources for film production and distribution. From 1991 to 2000, the ICAIC produced only 31 feature films. In 1990, its production of newsreels documenting the socialist revolution (the Noticiero ICAIC Latino-americano) ceased entirely.

As a result of the economic difficulties, the ICAIC engaged in co-production with other countries, such as Spain, (Germany) and Mexico. Fresa y chocolate (Strawberry and Chocolate) is one of the significant movies co-produced with Spain during the Special Period.

During this period, co-productions between ICAIC and the United States provided opportunities for civic engagement. For example, the United States Department of State collaborated with ICAIC in 1998 to screen Amistad as part of an effort to increase "cultural diplomacy" built around shared national histories of racial struggles.

=== Recent years ===
In 2000, the filmmaker Alfredo Guevara stepped down as president of the ICAIC in order to direct the International Havana Film Festival. Following his departure, the Cuban writer Omar Gonzalez replaced him, leading the ICAIC as its first ever non-filmmaker president and nominating other non-filmmakers to the organization's staff. As the head of the organization until 2013, Gonzalez focused on generating revenue and promoting the state's political ideology.

In recent years, the ICAIC has sought international partnerships in its effort to preserve its audiovisual archive and globally cement the country's cinematic heritage. In 2009, on the 50th anniversary of the ICAIC, the Noticiero ICAIC Latino-americano (Latin American newsreel) was included in UNESCO's Memory of the World Register. In 2023, UNESCO also added the ICAIC's collection of movie posters to the Memory of the World Register. The screen printed posters of 20th century films feature original artwork by Cuban graphic artists and designers who worked with the ICAIC, including Alfredo Rostgaard, Eduardo Muñoz Bachs, Rafael Morante, Antonio Fernández Reboiro, René Azcuy and Antonio Pérez (Ñiko).

ICAIC celebrated its 60th anniversary in 2019.

== See also ==
- Cinema of Cuba
- List of Cuban films
