= Fernando Pérez (director) =

Cuban film director

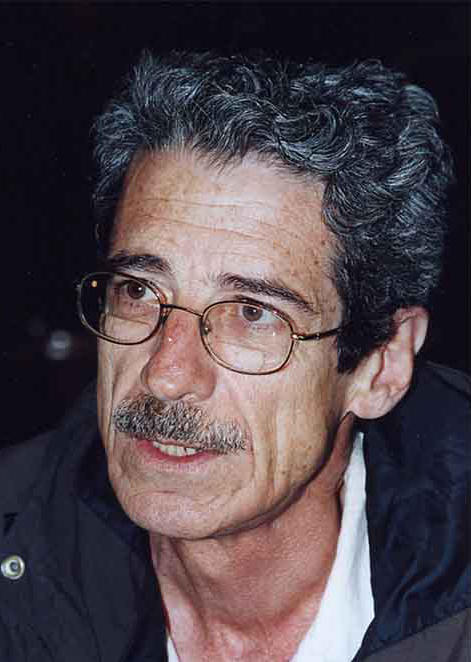
Fernando Pérez Valdés, Cuban film director

Fernando Pérez Valdés (born 19 November 1944) is a prominent Cuban film director.

== Career ==
Pérez graduated from the University of Havana with a degree in Language and Spanish Literature, and began working in the Cuban film industry in 1971 as an assistant director, before directing his first documentary in 1975.

His feature debut was the drama Clandestinos (1987) but it was not until Madagascar (1994) that he garnered significant international recognition. Pérez later directed La Vida es Silbar (1998) and Suite Habana (2003). Suite Habana is considered by some critics to be the best Cuban film in decades. Variety hailed it as "A lyrical, meticulously-crafted and unexpectedly melancholy homage to the battered but resilient inhabitants of a battered but resilient city." Madrigal tells a story about life in the theater world. His next film was a biopic that covered the childhood and early teenage years of Cuban national hero Jose Marti entitled Marti: El ojo del Canario, which premiered in 2010 and earned several awards in the film Festival Circuit. In recent years he completed La Pared de las Palabras (2014), Últimos Dias en la Habana (2016), Insumisas (2018) and El mundo de Nelsito (2023).

In the spring term 2016 Pérez was the fifth Friedrich Dürrenmatt Guest Professor for World Literature at the University of Bern.

As an actor, he played a role in the Cuban independent film Blue Heart (film) (2021).

== Cinematic style and aesthetic legacy ==
Pérez's cinema is characterized by a strong poetic sensibility and an intimate approach to his characters. His work combines elements of fiction and documentary filmmaking, with particular attention to visual composition, the expressive use of lighting, framing of the urban space, and silence as narrative devices. In his films, Cuban reality is often presented in connection with memory, dreams, imagination, and the subjective experiences of individuals. Films such as Life Is to Whistle and Suite Habana have been noted for their symbolic treatment of the city of Havana and for a mise-en-scène that combines documentary observation with poetic construction. His style has been associated with a conception of cinema as a form of reflection on identity and the human condition, through a combination of everyday realism, lyrical elements, and a strong visual and sonic dimension.

== Selected filmography ==
- Clandestinos (1987)
- Hello Hemingway (1990)
- Madagascar (1994)
- Life Is to Whistle (1998)
- Suite Habana (2003)
- Madrigal (2006)
- José Martí: el ojo del canario (2010)
- Last Days in Havana (2016)
- Insumisas (2018)
- El mundo de Nelsito (2023)
