= Adolfo Llauradó =

Cuban actor (1941–2001)

- Born: Bartolomé Adolfo Llauradó Salmerón; 29 September 1941; Santiago de Cuba, Cuba
- Died: 3 November 2001; Havana, Cuba
- Occupation: Actor
- Years active: 1950s–2001

Bartolomé Adolfo Llauradó Salmerón (29 September 1941 – 3 November 2001), known professionally as Adolfo Llauradó, was a Cuban actor who worked in theatre, film, radio and television. He worked in more than 20 Cuban feature films, including Manuela (1966), Lucía (1968), La primera carga al machete (1969), The Days of Water (1971), Portrait of Teresa (1979) and Un señor muy viejo con unas alas enormes (1988).

== Early life and career ==
Llauradó was born in Santiago de Cuba in 1941. Since his childhood he worked in radio in his native city, and later joined a theater troupe. In 1955 he went to Havana, where he worked in radio and television before joining the Teatro Nacional in 1959. He subsequently worked with the Conjunto Dramático Nacional and, in 1964, joined Teatro Estudio, where he became one of the company's lead performers. His theatre career included performances in both Cuban and international repertory. Some of them include Santa Camila de La Habana Vieja, Morir del cuento, Las tres hermanas, Bodas de sangre, El pagador de promesas, Dos viejos pánicos and En el parque. In 1966, Llauradó played Lalo in José Triana's La noche de los asesinos, directed by Vicente Revuelta for Teatro Estudio. The production received the Premio El Gallo de La Habana in 1966.

== Film ==
Llauradó became a regular presence in Cuban cinema during the 1960s and 1970s. His film roles included Tomás in Humberto Solás's Lucía and Máximo Gómez in Manuel Octavio Gómez's La primera carga al machete. He subsequently appeared in films like Los días del agua, El hombre de Maisinicú, El otro Francisco, Rancheador, Retrato de Teresa, Maluala, Polvo rojo and Habanera. His performance in Rancheador, directed by Sergio Giral, received the award for best male performance at the Panama International Film Festival in 1977. In later years, Llauradó appeared in films including Cartas del parque, Un señor muy viejo con unas alas enormes, El elefante y la bicicleta, Las profecías de Amanda and Rosa, la china. Rosa, la china, directed by Valeria Sarmiento, was his final feature-film appearance.

== Television ==
Llauradó worked in Cuban television from the 1950s onward, beginning with Así comenzó la historia in 1957. His television work included adaptations of literary and dramatic works such as Jean-Paul Sartre's The Flies, Honoré de Balzac's Thérèse Raquin, George Bernard Shaw's Saint Joan, Jean Giraudoux's Ondine, Honoré de Balzac's Le Père Goriot and Eugene O'Neill's Long Day's Journey into Night. His later television work included the 2001 teleplay La espera, directed by Vicente González Castro. For La espera, Llauradó received the Premio Caricato for best male performance in 2001.

== Documentary filmmaking ==
In the 1990s, Llauradó turned to work as a documentary filmmaker. He directed Carilda, desaparece el polvo (1994), about the Cuban poet Carilda Oliver Labra, Divas (1995), and Esmeralda (2000). Alongside his documentary work, he collaborated with students and emerging filmmakers at the Escuela Internacional de Cine y Televisión. In his later years he also acted in student films.

== Critical reception ==
Film critic and scholar Jorge Ruffinelli specifically associated Llauradó with his performances as Tomás in the third episode of Lucía and Ramón in Portrait of Teresa. Ruffinelli recalled Llauradó as “celando a la iletrada guajira, su mujer” in Lucía and, in Retrato de Teresa, as “the husband who was as unfaithful and chauvinistic as he was vulnerable”. He concluded that, rather than simply playing the cruel slave drivers and other villains he sometimes portrayed, “Adolfo Llauradó forged the image of a passionate, jealous and domineering man, with human characteristics rather than as a cliché”. Llauradó himself later explained his approach to Tomás in Lucía: “I had to understand the character. Perhaps at that time I understood him because I was extremely jealous”. He said that the role allowed him to channel feelings he carried within himself when he was young. In Retrato de Teresa, Llauradó played Ramón, whose machismo and infidelity create the central conflict with Teresa, played by Daisy Granados. Film scholar John Mraz noted that the two leading actors spent considerable time familiarizing themselves with the lives of the workers they portrayed. Llauradó explained his understanding of Ramón by saying that although he had come to agree intellectually with women's equality, established customs still affected his response to Teresa's demands for independence.

== Awards and distinctions ==
- 1977 – Best Male Performance, Panama International Film Festival, for Rancheador.
- 1984 – Acting award, Havana International Theatre Festival, for Santa Camila de La Habana Vieja and Morir del cuento.
- 1988 – Distinción por la Cultura Nacional.
- 2001 – Premio Caricato for Best Male Performance, for the television play La espera.
- 2001 – Medalla Alejo Carpentier.

The 1986 production of En el parque, directed by Vicente Revuelta and starring Llauradó and Alina Rodríguez, received a Festival de Teatro de Camagüey award for staging. Contemporary and later sources differ over whether Llauradó also received an individual acting award for the production; the surviving retrospective evidence independently documents Rodríguez's acting recognitions. The individual award is therefore not included here as an uncontested distinction.

== Death and legacy ==
Llauradó died in Havana on 3 November 2001 and buried in his native Santiago de Cuba. In 2003, the Sala Teatro Adolfo Llauradó in Havana was named in his honor. The theatre, located in the former Teatro Estudio complex in El Vedado, began operating under his name on 28 February 2003. The Premio de Actuación Adolfo Llauradó was subsequently established to recognize young performers in Cuban theatre, film and television. The award has included separate categories for theatre, film and television.

== Selected filmography ==
- Cuba 58 (1962)
- Manuela (1966)
- Lucía (1968)
- The First Charge of the Machete (1969)
- Los días del agua (1971)
- El hombre de Maisinicú (1973)
- El otro Francisco (1974)
- Rancheador’’ (1976)
- Portrait of Teresa (1979)
- Maluala (1979)
- Habanera (1984)
- Amor en campo minado (1987)
- Cartas del parque (1988)
- Un señor muy viejo con unas alas enormes (1988)
- El elefante y la bicicleta (1992)
- Las profecías de Amanda (1999)
- Rosa, la china (2001)

== See also ==
- Cuban cinema
