= Güijes =

Cuban Folklore

Güijes (also known as Jigües o Chichiricúes) are mythical creatures in Cuban folklore that live in bodies of fresh water. Although their physical description varies between sources, they are often depicted as short-statured, black skinned hominids. Some depictions resemble stereotypical African pygmies, while others resemble monstruous, hairy beasts. They are often naked, or scantly clad in leaves.

Güijes are characterized as mischievous and malicious, or occasionally playful and fun-loving. They can be summoned in many ways including by offering a cigar, circling a holy ceiba 12 times at midnight, or by an intentional group of seven men named Juan (siete Juanes).

== Cultural references ==
As stock characters in Cuban folklore, references to güijes can be found throughout Cuban music, film, literature, and art. Some famous references include:

- El Güije by Silvio Rodriguez, song
- A recurring character on El Camino de los Juglares, a Cuban children's show
- El Güije original animation by Instituto Cubano del Arte e Industria Cinematográficos (ICAC)
- Referenced in 'Viva Cuba', film by Juan Carlos Cremata Malberti
- Nūñez, Julia Calzadilla (1993). Los Chichiricú del charco de la Jícara (in Spanish). Ediciones Colihue SRL. ISBN 950-581-556-5.
- "Balada del Güije" poem in the 1934 anthology "West Indies Ltd." by Nicolás Guillén
