= Divá Bára (film) =

1949 film directed by Vladimír Čech

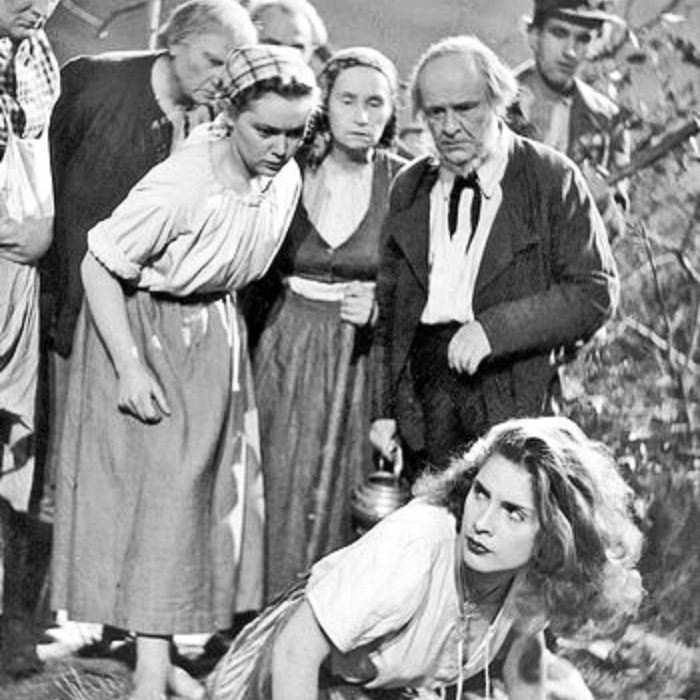
- Directed by: Vladimír Čech
- Written by: Vladimír Čech, Dalibor C. Vačkář, Miloslava Přikrylová
- Music by: Dalibor C. Vačkář
- Production company: Československý státní film
- Distributed by: Československý státní film
- Release date: 29 April 1949
- Running time: 76 min.
- Country: Czechoslovakia
- Language: Czech

Divá Bára (Wild Bára, Wild Barbara) is a 1949 Czechoslovak film based on the short story with the same name by Božena Němcová.

== Credited cast ==
- Vlasta Fialová, Bára
- Jana Dítětová, Eliška (Elška), friend of Bára
- Marie Brožová, parson's sister
- Robert Vrchota, hunter
- Jaroslav Vojta, parson
- Gustav Hilmar, village elder
- Jan Pivec, manor steward Sláma
- Josef Kemr, Josífek
- Marie Rýdlová
- Antonín Rýdl
- Josef Maršálek
- Josef Vošalík
