= Emilia Krakowska =

Polish actress (born 1940)

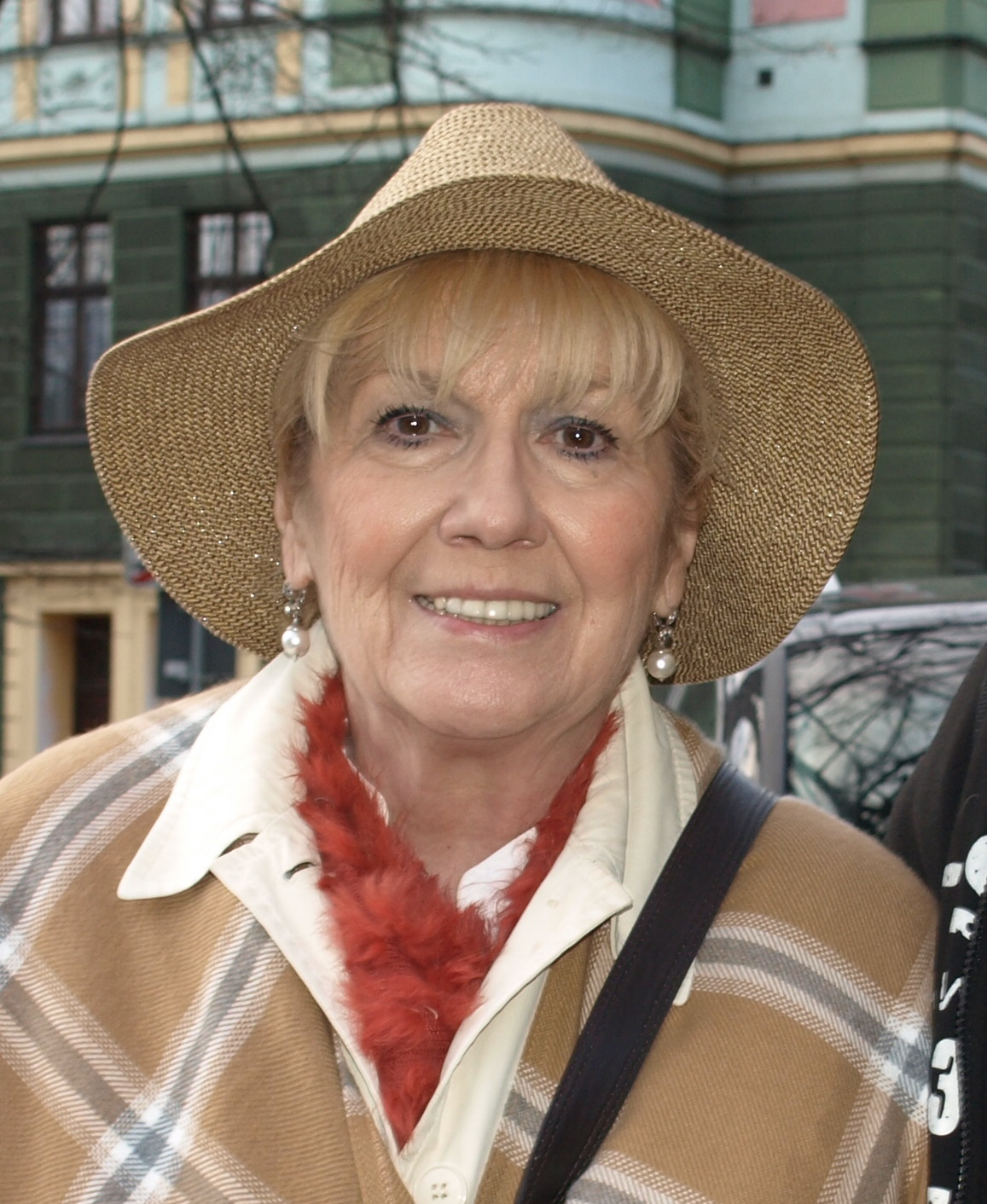
- Krakowska in 2012
- Born: 20 February 1940 (age 86); Poznań, Poland
- Occupation: actor

Emilia Krakowska (born 20 February 1940 in Poznań) is a Polish entertainer, film and theater actress.

== Biography ==
She graduated from the high school in Drezdenko and the Theatre Academy in Warsaw (1963). She worked in the following theaters: Powszechny in Warsaw (1964-1968), National (1968-1978), Contemporary in Warsaw (1978-1985) and Variety in Warsaw (1985-1991) and Teatr Powszechny in. Jan Kochanowski in Radom in 2008; Wroclaw Comedy Theatre, Drama Theatre; Alexander Hungarian Bialystok and the New Theatre in Slupsk.

She consolidated her film actress career in a number of television series. In the 1980s, she was a member of the National Council for Culture. She belonged to a group of actors who boycotted the Polish stage after the introduction of martial law in 1981.

In 2005, during the X Festival of Stars in Międzyzdroje she participated in the Promenade of Stars.

In 2013 she was rewarded by the Polish section of the International Association of Theatre Critics.

=== Private life ===
She was married four times, and is the mother of two daughters from the first and second marriage.

== Filmography ==
- 2013: Na krawędzi – Janina Orpik, matka Marty
- 2013: Lekarze – Władysława „Sophie" Żera (odc. 25)
- od 2012: Barwy szczęścia – Antonina
- 2012-2014: Galeria – Aniela
- 2009: Ojciec Mateusz – Alicja Lendo (odc. 16 „Wycieczka")
- 2007-2008: Hela w opałach – Krystyna Trojańska, była teściowa Heli
- 2005: Magiczne drzewo – babcia Schulz
- 2004 – 2009: Pierwsza miłość – Natalia Strońska-Radosz
- 2003: Ciało – Babcia Wanda
- 1999 – 2007, 2009: Na dobre i na złe – Gabriela Kalita
- 1993: Czterdziestolatek. 20 lat później – inżynier Halina Małecka-Klecka
- 1985: Chrześniak – Zosia
- 1980: Tylko Kaśka – sąsiadka Okońska
- 1977: Nie zaznasz spokoju – Krystyna
- 1976: Brunet wieczorową porą – nauczycielka oprowadzająca dzieci po muzeum
- 1974: Ziemia obiecana – Gitla
- 1973: Droga – Stefa (odc. 2 „Numer próbny")
- 1973: Chłopi – Jagna Pacześ (Borynowa)
- 1973: Jak to się robi – Alina Kubacka, kierowniczka Domu Pracy Twórczej „Muza"
- 1972: Chłopi – Jagna
- 1972: Wesele – Marysia, siostra panny młodej
- 1972: Kopernik – żona złodzieja Kacpra (odc. 3)
- 1971: Seksolatki – Wanda, partnerka Marka Kowalika
- 1970: Brzezina – Malina – wiejska dziewczyna
- 1964: Pingwin – dziewczyna w budce telefoniczne
- 1964: Nieznany – pielęgniarka

== Polish dubbing ==
- 2009: Hannah Montana: Film – Babcia Ruby
