= 7th Moscow International Film Festival =

Film festival

- Location: Moscow, Soviet Union
- Founded: 1959
- Awards: Grand Prix
- Festival date: 20 July – 3 August 1971
- Website: http://www.moscowfilmfestival.ru

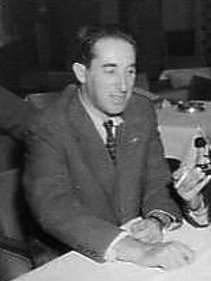
Grigori Kozintsev, 1958

The 7th Moscow International Film Festival was held from 20 July to 3 August 1971. The Golden Prizes were awarded to the Italian film Confessions of a Police Captain directed by Damiano Damiani, the Japanese film Live Today, Die Tomorrow! directed by Kaneto Shindo and the Soviet film The White Bird Marked with Black directed by Yuri Ilyenko.

== Jury ==
- Grigori Kozintsev (USSR - President of the Jury)
- Chinghiz Aitmatov (USSR)
- Paulin Soumanou Vieyra (Senegal)
- Sergei Gerasimov (USSR)
- Erwin Geschonneck (East Germany)
- Karel Zeman (Czechoslovakia)
- Giuliano Montaldo (Italy)
- James Aldridge (Great Britain)
- Galsaniin Rinchensambu (Mongolia)
- Armando Robles Godoy (Peru)
- Beata Tyszkiewicz (Poland)
- Youssef Chahine (Egypt)

== Films in competition ==
The following films were selected for the main competition:

English title	Original title	Director(s)	Production country
Akseli and Elina	Akseli ja Elina	Edvin Laine	Finland
The White Bird Marked with Black	Belaya ptitsa s chyornoj otmetinoj	Yuri Ilyenko	Soviet Union
The Birch Wood	Brzezina	Andrzej Wajda	Poland
In the Family	Em Família	Paulo Porto	Brazil
The Sandpit Generals	The Sandpit Generals	Hall Bartlett	United States
Goya or the Hard Way to Enlightenment	Goya – oder der arge Weg der Erkenntnis	Konrad Wolf	East Germany, Soviet Union, Bulgaria, Yugoslavia
Güemes: la tierra en armas	Güemes – la tierra en armas	Leopoldo Torre Nilsson	Argentina
Girl Nyun	Chị Nhung	Nguyễn Đức Hinh, Đặng Nhật Minh	North Vietnam
The Days of Water	Los días del agua	Manuel Octavio Gómez	Cuba
Son-in-Law	Khurgen khuu	Dejidiin Gigjid	Mongolia
Spaniards in Paris	Españolas en París	Roberto Bodegas	Spain
The Key	Klíč	Vladimír Čech	Czechoslovakia
Cromwell	Cromwell	Ken Hughes	Great Britain
Mathias Kneissl	Mathias Kneissl	Reinhard Hauff	West Germany
Last Crusade	Mihai Viteazul	Sergiu Nicolaescu	Romania, France, Italy
Mon oncle Antoine	Mon oncle Antoine	Claude Jutra	Canada
Knife	السكين Knife	Khaled Hammada	Syria
L'Opium et le Bâton	L'Opium et le Bâton	Ahmed Rachedi	Algeria
Wrathful Journey	Gnevno patuvane	Nikola Korabov	Bulgaria
Confessions of a Police Captain	Confessione di un commissario di polizia al procuratore della repubblica	Damiano Damiani	Italy
Sagina Mahato	Sagina Mahato	Tapan Sinha	India
Hail, Mary!	Салют, Мария!, Salyut, Maria!	Iosif Kheifits	Soviet Union
Live Today, Die Tomorrow!	Hadaka no jukyusai	Kaneto Shindo	Japan
The Toth Family	Isten hozta, őrnagy úr!	Zoltán Fábri	Hungary
Law Breakers	Les Assassins de l'ordre	Marcel Carné	France, Italy
Fellagas	Fellagas	Omar Khlifi	Tunisia, Bulgaria
Black Seed	Crno seme	Kiril Cenevski	Yugoslavia
Mr. Naive	Aghaye hallou	Dariush Mehrjui	Iran
Emitaï	Emitaï	Ousmane Sembène	Senegal

== Awards ==
- Golden Prize:
  - Confessions of a Police Captain by Damiano Damiani
  - Live Today, Die Tomorrow! by Kaneto Shindo
  - The White Bird Marked with Black by Yuri Ilyenko
- Golden Prize for Direction: Andrzej Wajda for The Birch Wood
- Silver Prizes:
  - Emitaï by Ousmane Sembène
  - The Key by Vladimír Čech
  - In the Family by Paulo Porto
- Special Prizes:
  - Goya or the Hard Way to Enlightenment by Konrad Wolf
  - The Days of Water by Manuel Octavio Gómez
- Prizes:
  - Best Actor: Daniel Olbrychski for The Birch Wood
  - Best Actor: Richard Harris for Cromwell
  - Best Actress: Ada Rogovtseva for Hail, Mary!
  - Best Actress: Idalia Anreus for The Days of Water
- Diplomas:
  - Ensemble of actors for Son-in-Law
  - Young actress: Kin Zung for Girl Nyun
- Prix FIPRESCI: The Days of Water by Manuel Octavio Gómez
- Special Mention: Little Big Man by Arthur Penn (non-competition film)
