= Františkovy Lázně =

- Town
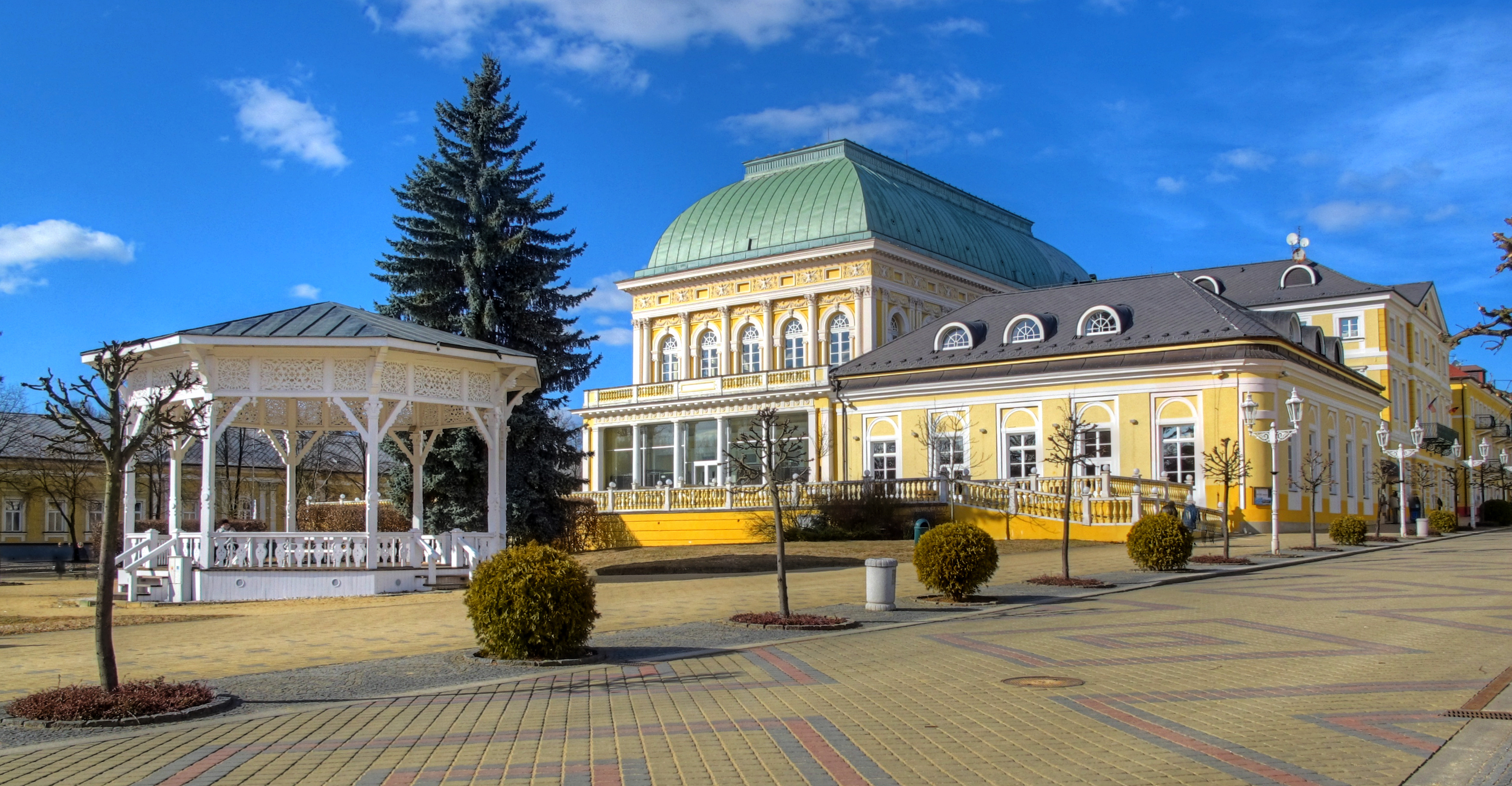
- Community Centre

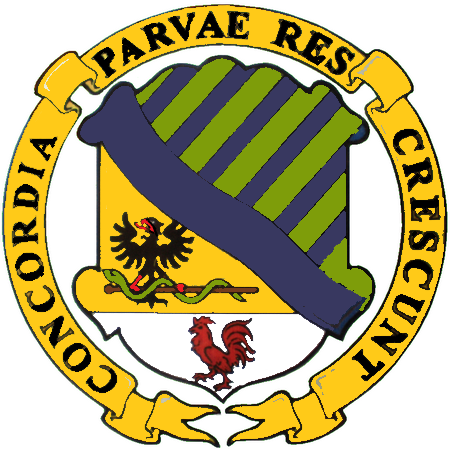
- Flag Coat of arms

- Location in the Czech Republic
- Coordinates: 50°7′14″N 12°21′7″E
- Country: Czech Republic
- Region: Karlovy Vary
- District: Cheb
- Founded: 1793

Government
  - Mayor: Lenka Průšová

Area
  - Total: 25.76 km^{2} (9.95 sq mi)
- Elevation: 442 m (1,450 ft)

Population (2026-01-01)
  - Total: 5,648
  - Density: 219.3/km^{2} (567.9/sq mi)
- Time zone: UTC+1 (CET)
  - Summer (DST): UTC+2 (CEST)
- Postal code: 351 01
- Website: www.mufrlazne.cz

UNESCO World Heritage Site
- Part of: The Great Spa Towns of Europe
- Criteria: Cultural: (ii)(iii)
- Reference: 1613
- Inscription: 2021 (44th Session)

Františkovy Lázně (Czech pronunciation: [ˈfraɲcɪʃkovɪ ˈlaːzɲɛ]; German: Franzensbad) is a spa town in Cheb District in the Karlovy Vary Region of the Czech Republic. It has about 5,600 inhabitants. The town is located in the Cheb Basin.

Františkovy Lázně was founded in 1793. Together with nearby Karlovy Vary and Mariánské Lázně, it forms the so-called West Bohemian Spa Triangle. The town centre is well preserved and is protected as an urban monument reservation. It is also part of the transnational UNESCO World Heritage Site under the name "Great Spa Towns of Europe" because of its natural springs and spa architecture.

== Administrative division ==
Františkovy Lázně consists of eight municipal parts (in brackets population according to the 2021 census):

- Františkovy Lázně (2,986)
- Aleje-Zátiší (59)
- Dlouhé Mosty (44)
- Dolní Lomany (235)
- Horní Lomany (890)
- Krapice (47)
- Slatina (416)
- Žírovice (355)

== Etymology ==
Both the Czech and German names mean "Francis' spa".

== Geography ==
Františkovy Lázně is located about 5 kilometres (3 mi) north of Cheb, in the historical Egerland region. It lies in the westernmost part of the Cheb Basin. The highest point is the hill Na Skále at 483 m (1,585 ft) above sea level.

The stream Slatinný potok, a tributary of the Ohře, flows through the municipal territory. The area is rich in fishponds, the largest of which is Amerika. Its western part with an island is protected as a nature reserve and is an important nesting place and migration stop for water birds. The eastern part of the pond is used for recreation.

== History ==
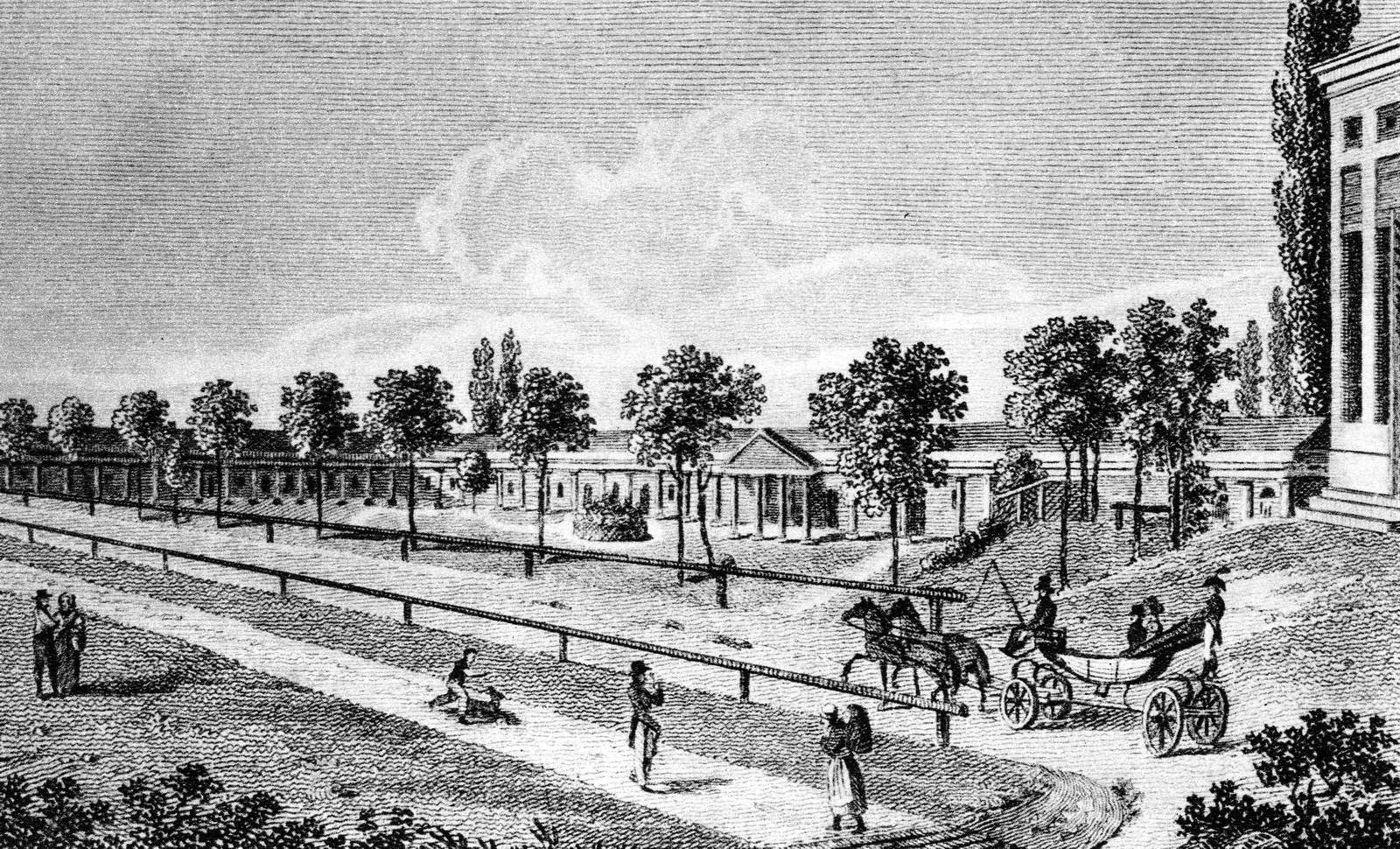
Colonnade, about 1850

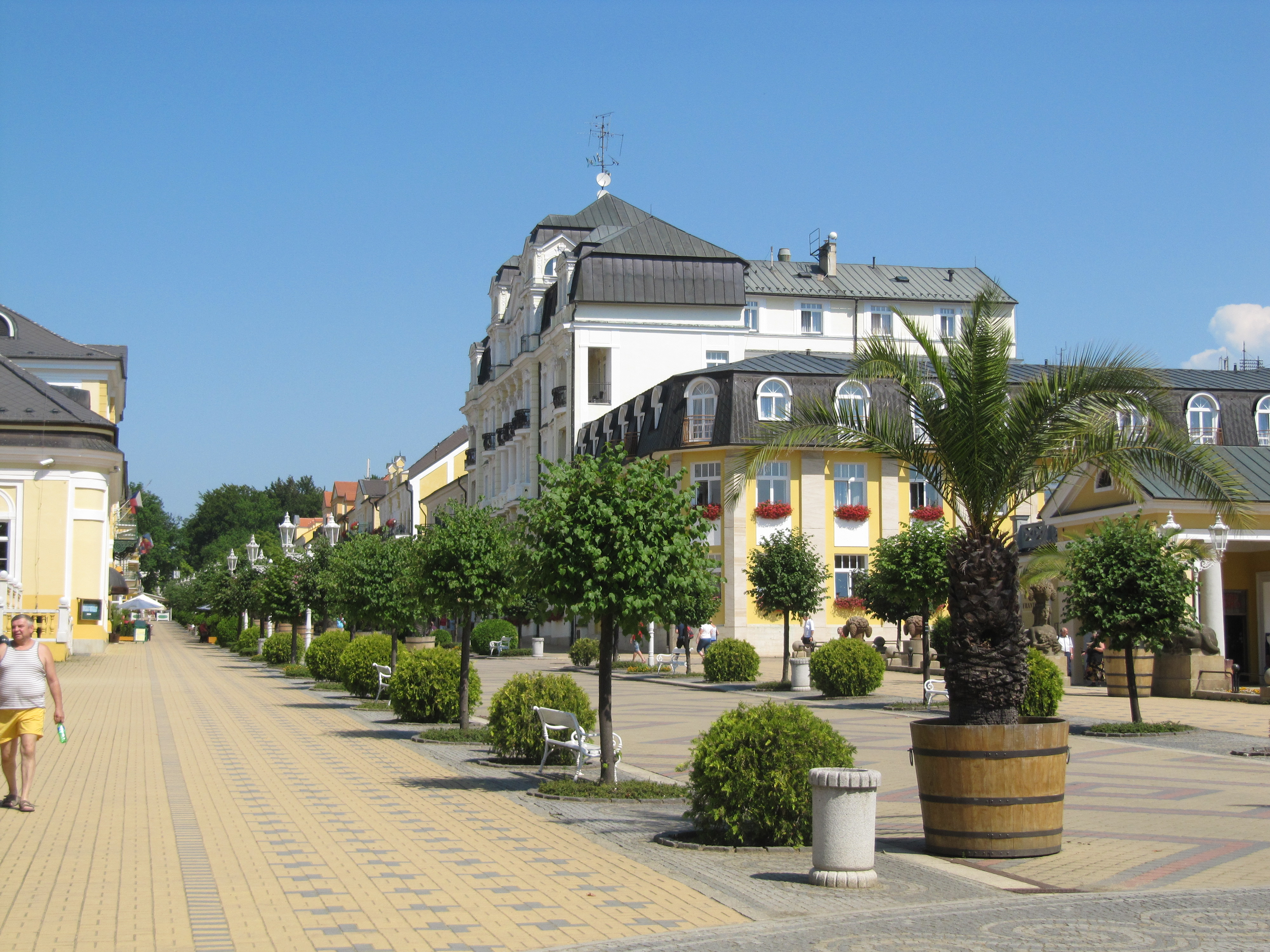
Národní boulevard

The salutary effects of the surrounding springs were known from the late 14th century on. The medical doctor Georgius Agricola (1494–1555) mentioned the mineral water available to Cheb citizens. The sources from which, according to ancient law, water was drafted and brought to the town, were first used locally for salutary purposes. Later, the water was also shipped in earthenware bottles, and in 1700, it reportedly sold more water than all other spas in the Empire combined. About 1705, an inn was erected at the site of a mineral spring later known as Franzensquelle.

On 27 April 1793, the town was officially founded under the name Kaiser Franzensdorf, after Emperor Francis II, and later renamed Franzensbad. The spa was founded by Eger-based doctor Bernhard Adler (1753–1810). He promoted the expansion of spa facilities and the accommodation for those seeking healing and promoted the transformation of the swampy moorland with paths and footbridges to well-known sources. The town was laid out around 24 springs in an orthogonal plan.

When in 1791 Adler had a pavilion and a water basin erected at the Franzensquelle, he sparked the Egerer Weibersturm ("Women's storm of Eger") by numerous women who earned their livelihood in the scooping, transport and sale of the water in Eger. Feeling their water-bearing rights threatened, they demolished his premises. The town council of Cheb intervened and made the extension of Franzensbad as a health resort possible. The result was an extensive recreation area, with easy access from the town of Cheb. In 1852, the spa became an independent municipality.

Johann Wolfgang von Goethe was one of the most famous guests in the early days; his visits to Franzensbad were extensively reported in the book written by Johannes Urzidil Goethe in Böhmen (1932). Other notable visitors were Ludwig van Beethoven, Johann Strauss Jr., Božena Němcová, Archduke Charles I of Austria, and Emperor Franz Joseph I of Austria, who promoted Františkovy Lázně to a town in 1865.

During the 19th century, patients included numerous aristocrats, especially Russian nobles, and at the same time, widely known doctors bolstered the reputation of Franzensbad as a therapeutic resort. Franzensbad offered one of the first peat pulp baths in Europe, popular especially with female guests. At the turn of the 19th and 20th centuries, the spa was visited by up to 20,000 patients and almost 80,000 spa tourists.

Until 1918, the town was part of the Bohemian crown land of Austria-Hungary. After World War I, the town's reputation began to fade. Then part of the new state of Czechoslovakia, the spa lost much of its patronage and was hit hard by the Great Depression of 1929. After World War II, the German-speaking population was expelled under the Beneš decrees. The spa, officially renamed Františkovy Lázně in Czech, was nationalised under the rule of the Communist Party. After the Velvet Revolution of 1989, a stock company was established to revive the status of Františkovy Lázně as a venue for international guests.

== Demographics ==
Historical population

Year	Pop.	±%
1869	3,070	—
1880	4,397	+43.2%
1890	4,354	−1.0%
1900	4,382	+0.6%
1910	5,239	+19.6%

Year	Pop.	±%
1921	5,608	+7.0%
1930	6,497	+15.9%
1950	3,335	−48.7%
1961	4,752	+42.5%
1970	4,849	+2.0%

Year	Pop.	±%
1980	5,192	+7.1%
1991	5,184	−0.2%
2001	5,261	+1.5%
2011	5,481	+4.2%
2021	5,032	−8.2%

Source: Censuses

== Spa ==
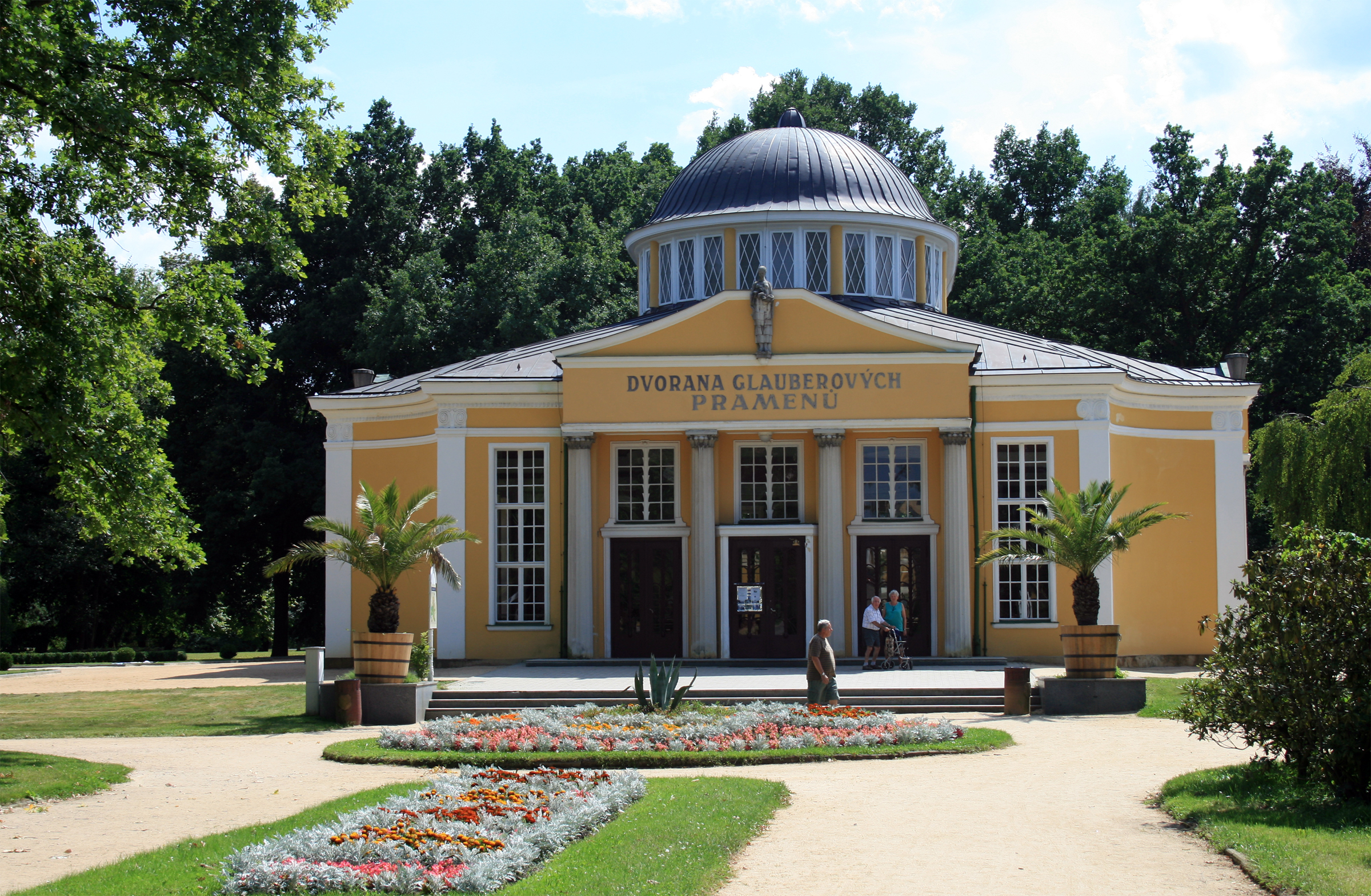
Glauber's springs

Twenty-three out of the 24 springs in the town are actively used, and local natural mineral water has a relatively high content of dissolved carbon dioxide, although the ratios of the chemical components vary across all of the springs. The mineral-rich springs are formed from the infiltration of precipitation into the sedimentary Cheb Basin. The effects of the carbonic baths are shown in the better performance of the cardiovascular system, in the mild decrease of blood pressure in the pulse, in the lower occurrence of chronic inflammatory processes in the body, and also in terms of rheumatics, and the improved blood circulation in tissues and the vegetative stabilisation.

The local mud treatments represent a traditional curative method with thermal, chemical and mechanical effects. The treatment has a positive effect on the mobility of muscles and the pain in treated tissues.

The local spa corporation is the biggest in the Czech Republic. It unites eight spa houses and hotels with a capacity of about 1,500 beds. It operated 24 mineral springs, 12 of which are still in operation.

== Transport ==
The I/21 road (which connects Cheb and the D6 motorway with the Czech–German border crossing in Vojtanov; part of the European route E49) runs through Františkovy Lážně. The I/64 road splits from it and connects Františkovy Lážně with Aš. The I/6 road (the continuation of the D6 motorway that leads to the border crossing in Pomezí nad Ohří; part of the European route E48) runs south of the town.

Františkovy Lázně is located on the railway line Cheb–Hof.

== Culture ==
The Božena Němcová Theatre was built in the current area in 1868. The new theatre building was built in the Neoclassical style in 1927–1928 and interiors were decorated in Art Deco style.

The town has two museums: the Municipal Museum and the small private Museum of Motorcycles and Cars.

In Františkovy Lázně is the water park Aquaforum Lázně Františkovy Lázně.

== Sights ==
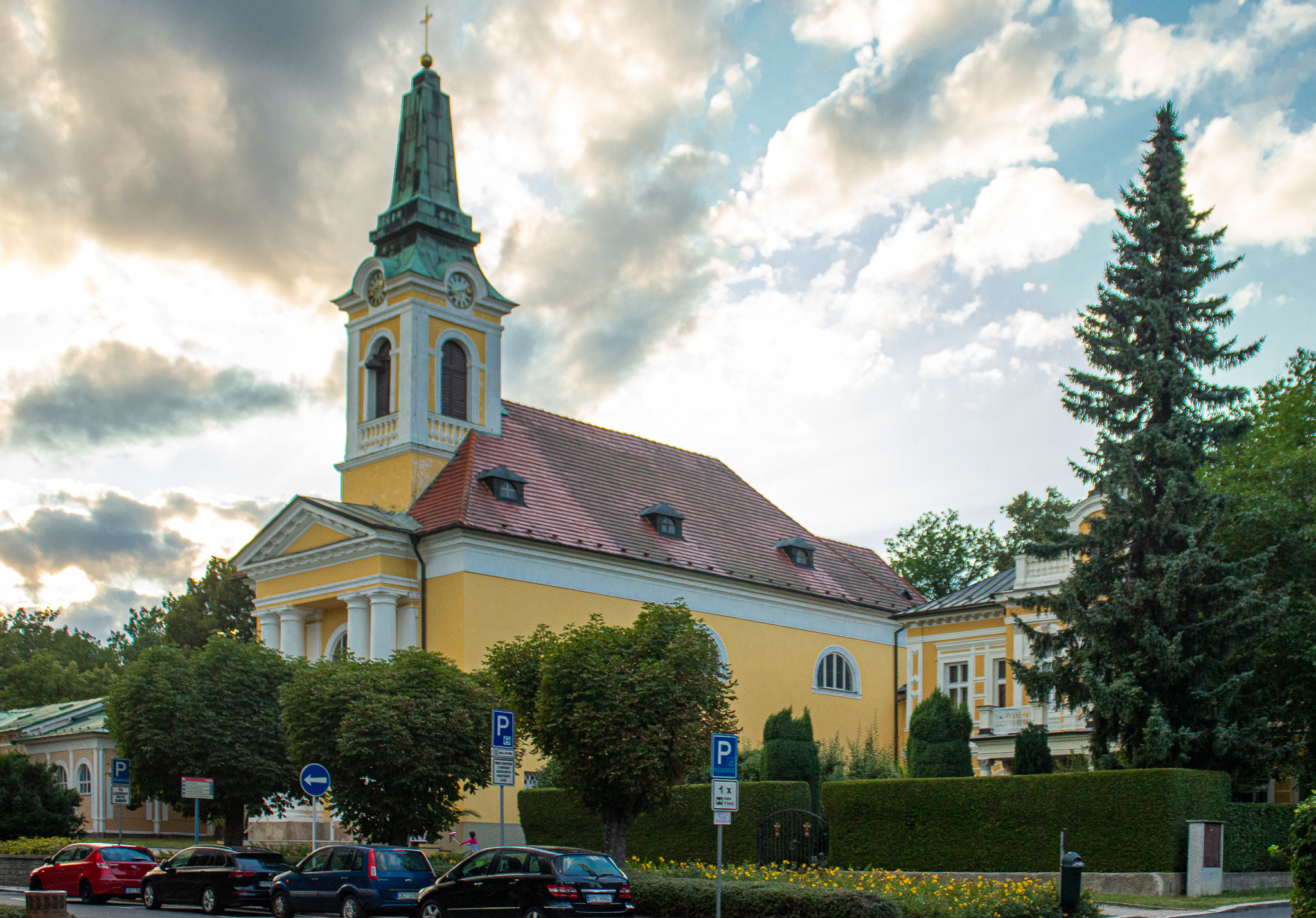
Church of the Exaltation of the Holy Cross

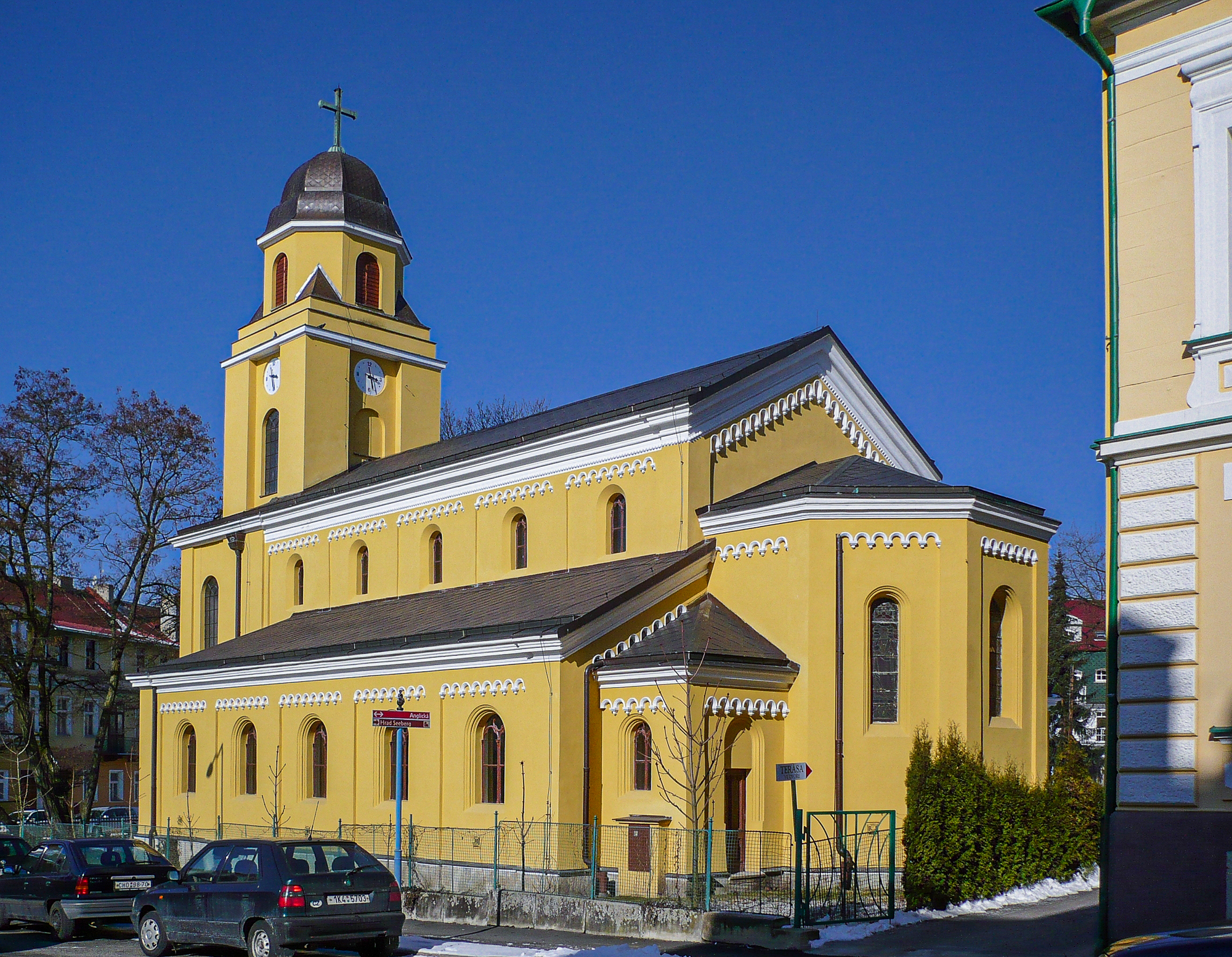
Church of Saints Peter and Paul

Since 1992, the historic town centre has been protected as an urban monument reservation. In 2021, the town became part of the transnational UNESCO World Heritage Site under the name "Great Spa Towns of Europe" because of its natural springs and its architectural testimony to the popularity of spa towns across Europe in the 18th through 20th centuries.

The Social House is the dominant feature of the spa centre. It was built in 1877 in the Neo-Renaissance style. It is the venue of congresses, balls and other social events, and the building also houses a casino.

The Church of the Exaltation of the Holy Cross was built in the Empire style in 1815–1820. This Roman Catholic church is one of the best examples of purely Empire sacral buildings in the country.

The Church of Saint Olga is an Orthodox church. It was built in the spirit of Russian Baroque buildings in 1887.

The Church of Saints Peter and Paul is an Evangelical church. It was built in the Neo-Romanesque style in 1875–1880. The prismatic tower with Cubist elements dates from the 1920s.

The Church of Saint James the Great is located in Horní Lomany. It was built in the Baroque style in 1739–1741.

== Notable people ==
- Karl Müller (1866–1942), Austrian astronomer
- August Brömse (1873–1925), Czech-German painter
- Friedrich Stelzner (1921–2020), German academic surgeon
- Miroslav Kostelka (born 1951), diplomat and politician
- Ladislav Takács (born 1996), footballer

== Twin towns – sister cities ==
Františkovy Lázně is twinned with:

- Bad Soden, Germany
