= Paula Alí =

Cuban actress (1938–2026)

- Born: Paula Andrea Alí Rivera; 26 January 1938; Candelaria, Cuba
- Died: 3 August 2026 (aged 88); Havana, Cuba
- Occupation: Actress
- Years active: 1959–2026

Paula Andrea Alí Rivera (26 January 1938 – 3 August 2026) was a Cuban film, television and stage actress. Beginning her career as a model on television in the 1950s, she began acting on stage with Teatro Martí in 1965 and, later, the Teatro Estudio and Teatro El Público. Alí also worked as a film and television actress, performing in films such as Letters from the Park (1988), The Elephant and the Bicycle (1994), Nothing More (2001), Horn of Plenty (2008), Esther Somewhere (2013) and Neurótica anónima (2026) and television shows including ¡Oh, La Habana!. In 2026, shortly before her death, Alí was given a lifetime achievement award by the National Union of Writers and Artists of Cuba.

== Career ==
Alí began working in the entertainment industry in 1959, as a model. Six years later, in 1965, she had begun working on stage and joined the Havana-based Teatro Martí. In 1970, Alí joined the Teatro Estudio and, later, the Teatro El Público. Working in the theatre, she performed both domestically and in Latin American countries such as Colombia, Ecuador, and Venezuela and European countries including Portugal, Spain, and Yugoslavia. With the Teatro Estudio, she performed in renditions of Virgilio Piñera's Aire frío, Federico García Lorca's Blood Wedding and La casa de Bernarda Alba, and José Antonio Rodríguez's Los inventos de un escaparate. In 2002, with Teatro El Público, she played Celestina in a performance of La Celestina directed by Carlos Díaz. Her performance, where she acted Celestina as a softer force, was well received. Her performance in Una mujer sola won the Segismundo award and awards from the National Union of Writers and Artists of Cuba in 1990.

Upon being cast in telenovelas, Alí became a well-known and respected actress in Cuba. She played roles in telenovelas, dramas, and comedy shows. In the comedy Punto G (transl. G-spot), which also featured her nephew, she played the role of Rosa Matriz. She also worked in films and short films. Alí played a cleaning woman in the 1990 short film Oscuros Rinocerontes Enjaulados and, alongside Cuban actresses Isabel Santos and Coralia Veloz Fernández, acted in the 2004 short film Leo y Julieta. The story depicted a lesbian relationship and was only shown for one day at a film festival. Also in the early 2000s, she performed in Nothing More; in 2003, she won the best actress award from the Cartagena International Film Festival for her role.

Awards earnt by Alí during her lifetime include a National Culture Award, an Artista de Mérito de la Radio y la Televisión award (2012), the Raúl Gómez García medal, and a small screen award and lifetime achievement award from Agencia Artística de Artes Escénicas ACTUAR. On 22 July 2026, shortly before her death, she was given a lifetime achievement award by the National Union of Writers and Artists of Cuba.

== Personal life and death ==
Paula Andrea Alí Rivera was born in Candelaria, Cuba, on 26 January 1938. She died in Havana on 3 August 2026, at the age of 88. Her death was confirmed by the National Union of Writers and Artists of Cuba. (Note: Many sources mislabel her age as "90".)

Alí had a nephew who was also an actor.

== Credits ==
=== Film ===
- Letters from the Park (1988)
- Supporting Roles (1989)
- Oscuros Rinocerontes Enjaulados (1990, as the Cleaning Woman)
- The Elephant and the Bicycle (1994)
- Guantanamera (1995)
- Vertical Love (1997)
- The Waiting List (2000)
- Miel para Oshún (2001)
- Nothing More (2001)
- Leo y Julieta (2004)
- Perfecto amor equivocado (2004)
- Horn of Plenty (2008)
- Esther Somewhere (2013, as Julietta)
- Viva (2015)
- ¿Por qué lloran mis amigas? (2018)
- Neurótica anónima (2026)

=== Television ===
- Enamorada del mar
- Retablo personal
- Las huérfanas de la Obrapía
- Salir de noche
- ¡Oh, La Habana!
- La otra esquina
- Vuelve a mirar
- Los hijos de Pandora
- Punto G (as Rosa Matriz)
- Sábados de gloria (2025)

=== Stage ===
- Aire frío (1981)
- Blood Wedding (1983)
- La casa de Bernarda Alba (1981)
- La Celestina (directed by Carlos Díaz)
- Los inventos de un escaparate (1981)
- Milanés
- Morir del cuento
- Plácido
- El premio flaco
- Santa Camila de La Habana Vieja
- La última carta de la baraja
- Una mujer sola
