= Adam Sławiński =

Polish composer

Adam Sławiński (born 27 November 1935, in Leśniczówka) is a Polish composer.

In the years 1957–1962, he worked as an editor of music in Telewizja Polska. Then he composed music for television series and has written music for some 40 films and serials. In the years 1974–1975, he was deputy managing editor of the music of Polskie Radio and in the years 1990–1991, he was director of the Program 2 Polskiego Radia.

Sławinski also wrote many of Poland's popular songs.

== Selected filmography ==
Soundtracks:

- Skok (1967)
- Gra (1968)
- Chłopi (1973)
- Za dzień, za rok, za chwilę... (1976)
- Najdłuższa wojna nowoczesnej Europy (1979-1981)
- Komediantka (1987)
