= Anatoly Alexandrov (composer) =

Soviet-Russian composer

Anatoly Alexandrov Анатолий Александров
- Born: May 25, 1888; Moscow, Russian Empire
- Died: April 16, 1982 (aged 93) Moscow, Russian SFSR, Soviet Union
- Occupations: Composer, pianist

Anatoly Nikolayevich Alexandrov (Note: Russian: Анато́лий Никола́евич Алекса́ндров, romanized: Anatoly Nikolayevich Aleksandrov, anglicized: Alexandrov) (May 25, 1888 [O.S. May 13], Moscow – April 16, 1982, Moscow) was a Soviet and Russian composer of works for piano and for other instruments, and pianist. His initial works had a mystical element, but he downplayed this to better fit socialist realism. He led a somewhat retiring life, but received several honors.

Alexandrov was the son of a Professor of Tomsk State University. He attended the Moscow Conservatory (which he left in 1915), where he was a pupil of Nikolai Zhilyayev, Sergei Taneyev and Sergei Vasilenko (theory), Alexander Ilyinsky (composition) and Konstantin Igumnov (pianoforte). His early music revealed the influence of Nikolai Medtner and Alexander Scriabin. He was appointed Professor at the Moscow Conservatory in 1923. Viktor Belyaev, Alexandrov's first biographer, wrote in 1926: "If Myaskovsky is a philosopher, and Feinberg a psychologist, then Alexandrov is, before anything else, a poet." Alexandrov was also a strong proponent of Stanchinsky and edited much of his compositions for publication.

== Works ==
=== For orchestra ===
- Symphony No. 1 in C, Op. 92 (1965)
- Symphony No. 2 in B♭, Op. 109 (1977/78)
- Piano Concerto, Op. 102 (1974)
- Overture on Russian folksongs, Op. 29 (1915, rev. 1930)
- Overture on two Russian folksongs, Op. 65 (1948)
- Stage and Film music

=== Vocal music ===
- Two Worlds, opera (1916) (after the drama Two Worlds by Apollon Maykov)
- The Forty First, opera, Op. 41 (1933–35, unfinished, after Boris Lavrenyov's novel)
- Bela, opera, Op. 51 (1940–45) (after Bela from A Hero of Our Time)
- Дикая Бара, Dikaya Bara, opera, Op. 82 (1954–57) (after Wild Bara by Božena Němcová)
- Levsha, opera, Op. 103 (1975) (after Levsha)
- many songs for voice and piano

=== Chamber music ===
- String Quartet No. 1 in G, Op. 7(1914, rev. 1921)
- String Quartet No. 2 in C♯ minor, Op. 54 (1942)
- String Quartet No. 3, Op. 55 (1942)
- String Quartet No. 4 in C major, Op. 80 (1953)
- Cello Sonata in G major, Op. 112 (1981/82)

=== Piano sonatas ===
- Sonata No. 1 in F♯ minor, Op. 4. "Märchensonate" (1914)
- Sonata No. 2 in D minor, Op. 12 (1918)
- Sonata No. 3 in F♯ minor, Op. 18 (1920, rev. 1956 und 1967)
- Sonata No. 4 in C, Op. 19 (1922, rev. 1954)
- Sonata No. 5 in G♯ minor, Op. 22 (1923, rev. 1938)
- Sonata No. 6 in G, Op. 26 (1925)
- Sonata No. 7 in D, Op. 42 (1932)
- Sonata No. 8 in B♭, Op. 50 (1939–44)
- Sonata No. 9 in C minor, Op. 61 (1945)
- Sonata No. 10 in F, Op. 72 (1951)
- Sonata No. 11 in C, Op. 81 "Sonate-Fantasie" (1955)
- Sonata No. 12 in B minor, Op. 87 (1962)
- Sonata No. 13 in F♯ minor, Op. 90 "Märchensonate" (1964)
- Sonata No. 14 in E, Op. 97 (1971)

=== Other piano works ===
- 6 Preludes, Op. 1 (revised by the composer, 1961)
- 2 Pieces, Op. 3 (revised by the composer, 1919)
- "Obsession passée", 4 Fragments, Op. 6 (1911–17)
- Poem, op. 9 (1915)
- 4 Preludes, Op. 10 (1916)
- Two Fragments from the Music to the Drama by M. Maeterlinck "Ariana and Blue-Beard", op. 16a
- Visions, 5 pieces, op. 21 (1919-1923)
- Three Pieces, op. 27 (1927)
- 3 Etudes, Op. 31
- Little Suite No. 1, Op. 33 (1929)
- "Eight Pieces after themes from Songs of the People of the USSR", Op. 46 (1937)
- 4 Narratives, Op. 48 (1939)
- Ballad, Op. 49 (1939)
- Suite Fantasia after opera "Bela", three pieces, op. 51b
- Echoes of the Theatre, six pieces, op. 60
- Four Miniature Pictures, op. 66 (1937)
- Bashkirian Melodies, 9 pieces, op. 73 (1950)
- Four Pieces, op. 75 (1951)
- Russian Folk Melodies, volume 2, 10 pieces, op. 76 (1951)
- Little Suite No. 2, Op. 78 (1952)
- "Romantic Episodes", 10 pieces, Op. 88 (1962)
- Elegy and Waltz, Op. 89 (1964)
- Four Pieces from Incidental Music for Films, op. 92 (1967)
- Pages From A Diary, Book 1, ten pieces, op. 94 (1967)
- Pages From A Diary, Book 2, ten pieces, op. 95 (1967-1968)
- Three Fugues, op. 100 (1973)
- Little Suite No. 3, Op. 102 (1973)
- "My Soul -- Elysium of Visions", 5 pieces, Op. 110 (1979)
- "Visions", 2 pieces, Op. 111 (1979, unfinished)

==== Instrumental music ====
Suite for Wind Quartet (Flute, Oboe, Clarinet, Bassoon)
