= KLIC =

KLIC may refer to:

- KLIC (AM), a defunct radio station (1230 AM) licensed to serve Richwood, Louisiana, United States
- Klíč (mountain), a peak of the Lusatian Mountains
- The Key (1971 film) (Czech: Klíč), a 1971 Czech film
- Kulicke & Soffa Industries
- Kullback–Leibler divergence
- Klic, former stage name of the British House music artist Medlar

== People ==
- Karel Klíč (1841–1926), Czech painter, photographer and illustrator
- Sandro Klić (born 1981), Croatian footballer
