= Skok =

- Pronunciation: Slovene: [skɔ̀k]

Origin
- Languages: Slovenian, Croatian, Belarusian, Ukrainian and Russian
- Meaning: jump, leap
- Region of origin: Europe

Other names
- See also: Springer (surname), Jumper

Skok (Cyrillic: Скок) is a Slovenian, Croatian, Belarusian, Ukrainian and Russian surname.

It is derived from the Slavic word skok for "leap, jump", or more precisely the Slovene word skočiti for "to jump, to leap". The surname Skok has its highest density in Slovenia, where it was used in the 15th and 16th century as a nickname for Christian refugees from the Turks, who had fled the territories conquered by the Ottoman Empire to the southeast.

== Notable people with the name ==
- Craig Skok (born 1947), American baseball player
- Heidi Skok, American operatic soprano
- Jane Skok, South African-American professor
- Janez Skok (born 1963), Slovenian slalom canoeist
- Joža Skok (1931–2017), Croatian literary historian
- Margaret Skok, Canadian diplomat
- Matevž Skok (born 1986), Slovenian handball player
- Petar Skok (1881–1956), Croatian linguist
- Viacheslav Skok (born 1946), Russian water polo player
