= Wild Bára =

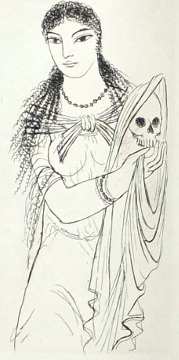
Wild Bára, illustration by Antonín Procházka, 1934

Wild Bára (Czech: Divá Bára) is an 1856 romantic short story by Božena Němcová with elements of fantasy. It is a story of a village girl, who is nice and cheerful, but her courage, independence and unusual appearance do not meet the expected stereotypes and she is not accepted by the superstitious villagers.

== Plot ==
Bára (Note: Bára is a diminutive of the name Barbora or Barbara) was single child of a shepherd Jakub whose wife died a long time ago. Soon after the childbirth a mysterious accident happened to her mother: she was cooking when she was six weeks after the childbirth and supposed to be in bed, and was found fainted. Since this happened right at the high noon, villagers started to suspect that the girl was a "wild child" brought by a noon witch: they decided that she has too big eyes, too big head, etc. This is how she got her nickname, Wild Bara.

Bára grows up as a good-natured girl, but her independence and unusual behavior are met with the prejudice from the villagers. A strong and emotional friendship develops between Bára and priest's daughter Elška.

Elška falls in love with a medical student from Prague, but she had to marry the manor steward Sláma. Bára decides to help Eliška. She plans to pretend to be a ghost at the cemetery and scare Sláma to leave Eliška alone, but the villagers discover the ruse and punish Bára by locking her in the cemetery chapel for a night.

Eventually all comes to a happy end for Bára and her friends.

== Commentary ==
Dáša Francíková cites Wild Bára as an example of intimate and strong bonds between women in Božena Němcová's novels, summarizing the relationship of Bára and Elška.

Alfred Thomas argues that the two contrasting characters of the two heroines (plain and masculine Bára and pretty and feminine Elška) "reflect the two halves of writer's identity".

== Adaptations and translations ==
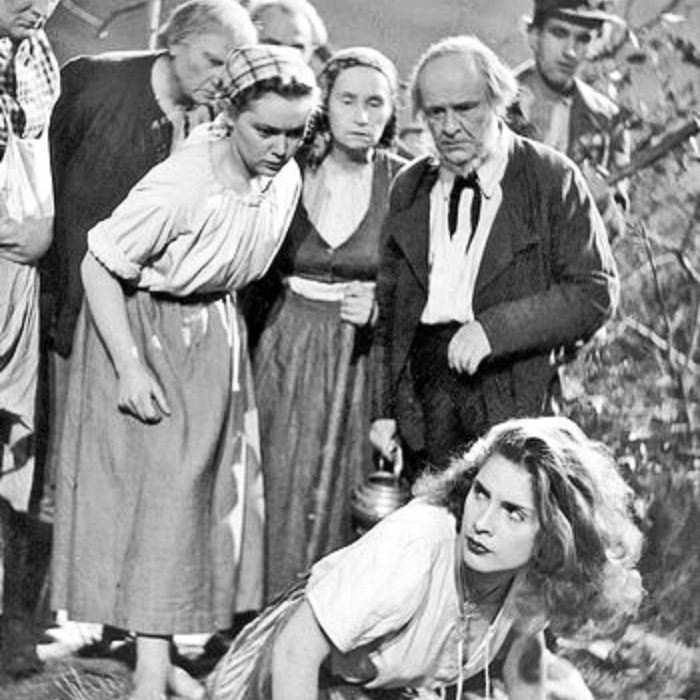
A scene from the 1949 film, Vlasta Fialová as Wild Bára

- Divá Bára, a 1949 film by Vladimír Čech
- Дикая Бара, Dikaya Bara, opera, Op. 82 (1957) by Russian composer Anatoly Alexandrov
- In 2014 a musical was staged with music by Miloš Štědroň and Leoš Kuba, libretto by Milan Uhde, starring Žofie Dařbujánová.

It was translated into Russian as Дикая Бара, Dikaya Bara in 1854 and in 1984 and in German as Die wilde Bara in 1962.
