= Nothing More (film) =

2001 film

- Directed by: Juan Carlos Cremata Malberti
- Written by: Juan Carlos Cremata Malberti
- Starring: Thais Valdés
- Release date: 30 November 2001
- Running time: 90 minutes
- Country: Cuba
- Language: Spanish

Nothing More (Spanish: Nada) is a 2001 Cuban comedy film directed and written by Juan Carlos Cremata Malberti. It was selected as the Cuban entry for the Best Foreign Language Film at the 75th Academy Awards, but it was not nominated.

== Cast ==
- Thais Valdés as Carla Pérez
- Nacho Lugo as Cesar
- Daisy Granados as Cunda
- Paula Ali as Cuca

== See also ==
- List of submissions to the 75th Academy Awards for Best Foreign Language Film
- List of Cuban submissions for the Academy Award for Best Foreign Language Film
