= The First Charge of the Machete =

1969 Cuban historical film directed by Manuel Octavio Gómez

- Directed by: Manuel Octavio Gómez
- Screenplay by: Manuel Octavio Gómez; Alfredo L. del Cueto; Jorge Herrera; Julio García Espinosa
- Starring: Adolfo Llauradó; José Rodríguez; Idalia Anreus
- Cinematography: Jorge Herrera
- Edited by: Nelson Rodríguez
- Music by: Leo Brouwer; Pablo Milanés
- Release date: 1969
- Country: Cuba
- Language: Spanish

The First Charge of the Machete (La primera carga al machete) is a 1969 Cuban historical film directed by Manuel Octavio Gómez. It dramatizes the beginning of the Ten Years' War against Spanish colonial rule, particularly the first use of the machete as a weapon by Cuban insurgents underthe leadership of Máximo Gómez. The film deliberately combines historical fiction with documentary techniques. It had its world premiere at Directors' Fortnight at the 1969 Cannes Film Festival.

== Plot ==
The film is set during the opening stages of the Ten Years' War in 1868. After a battle with Cuban rebels, wounded Spanish soldiers describe the attack and the effectiveness of the Cuban insurgents' machetes, followed by interviews with residents of Bayamo who discuss the aftermath of the battle. A Spanish column led by Spanish commanders Campillo and Quirós is dispatched against the insurgents to retake the city, while the Cuban forces, led by Máximo Gómez, prepare for battle. Rather than presenting the events solely through conventional dramatic scenes, the film repeatedly adopts the appearance of a contemporary documentary. Characters address the camera as a simulated interviews, alternated with an always handheld camera, which also moves through crowds and battle scenes. A wandering troubadour, played by Pablo Milanés, provides commentary about the events. The climatic battle is a machete charge against the Spanish troops, which lead the rebels to victory. The film creates a deliberate anachronistic connection of 100 years between the nineteenth-century war and the revolutionary Cuba of 1969.

== Cast ==
- Adolfo Llauradó as Máximo Gómez
- José Rodríguez
- Idalia Anreus
- Eslinda Núñez
- Julio Vega
- Ana Viñas
- Pablo Milanés
- Raúl Pomares
- Miguel Benavides

== Production ==
=== Cinematic Style ===
The film was produced by ICAIC as part of the cultural commemoration of the centenary of the beginning of Cuba's wars of independence. Gómez reconstructed the historical events while deliberately giving them the appearance of a contemporary documentary.

José Rojas Bez wrote about the film's high-contrast black-and-white photographyby Jorge Herrera, which is integrated to simulated interviews and documentary-style staging,a s well as to the battle scenes to emulate documentary conventions and the look of early cinema. Sound recordist Raúl García later discussed the production of the film and its use of synchronized sound recording in an interview published by Cuban film scholar Juan Antonio García Borrero. García described Gómez's intention to make the historical events appear as though they were being recorded as a contemporary reportage and discussed the technical challenges of recording synchronized sound while the camera was continuously moving. Juan-Navarro describes Herrera's cinematography during the final battle as highly stylized, with the photography taking on the appearance of a daguerreotype and the imagery becoming increasingly abstract.

== Reception ==
Cuban critic and filmmaker Daniel Díaz Torres discussed the film in Pensamiento Crítico in 1970. He emphasized the importance of its projection of the historical material into the contemporary present and its use of documentary techniques to make the reconstructed events appear spontaneous and convincing. Díaz Torres particularly highlighted the film's use of interviews with historical characters rather than conventional scenes. In his opinion, the device gives the film a sense of spontaneity and immediacy.

French critic Sylvie Pierre also discussed the film in Cahiers du cinéma in June 1969. Pierre described it as resembling a direct-cinema report about events a century in the past, emphasizing the tension between documentary form and historical fiction. The film has been discussed by some critics as a peak example of the experimental tendencies in late-1960s Cuban cinema. Michael Chanan describes its reconstruction of the opening battle as if it were a contemporary documentary, which uses high-contrast black-and-white cinematography suggestive of early cinema with handheld camerawork and direct location sound. The film has subsequently been discussed in scholarship on Cuban historical cinema, documentary aesthetics and the relationship between revolutionary politics and historical representation.

== Awards and nominations ==
- 1969 — Gold Medal (selection), Venice Film Festival
- 1969 — Luis Buñuel Prize, awarded by the Spanish film critics accredited at the Venice Film Festival
- 1969 — Belgian Jury Prize, International Art and Essay Film Tournament, Leuven, Belgium
