= Oscuros Rinocerontes Enjaulados =

- Directed by: Juan Carlos Cremata
- Release date: 1990
- Country: Cuba
- Language: Spanish

Oscuros Rinocerontes Enjaulados is a 1990 Cuban short film.

== Description ==
Using a broad range of experimental techniques, the film takes on some of the giants of absurdist and surreal filmmaking. Made by a graduate of the first generation of students from the film school at San Antonio de los Baños, Cuba, this black and white parody of bureaucracy in Cuba features a cleaning woman who discovers that her boss is making obscene phone calls. The film was directed by Juan Carlos Cremata, then a Cuban student at the EICTV (International Film School of San Antonio de los Baños). The short film made the festival rounds winning several awards and is now considered a Latin American Classic.

== Cast ==
- Paula Alí
- Elier Gonzalez
- Sandra Ibarra
- Rita Marie Diaz
- Charles Nettey

== Awards ==
- Gran Premio "El Chicuelo". IV Festival de Cine Joven, La Habana, Cuba
- Premio "Saúl Yelín" de la Federación Nacional de Cine Clubes de Cuba. 1990.
- Premio "Yara". Centro Cinematográfico. La Habana, 1990.
- Grand Prize EISENSTEIN at the Wilhelmshaven International Film Festival, Germany, 1992.
- Archived at Museum of Modern Art (MOMA), 1996.
