= The Birch Wood =

1970 Polish film

- Directed by: Andrzej Wajda
- Starring: Olgierd Łukaszewicz; Daniel Olbrychski; Emilia Krakowska
- Music by: Andrzej Korzynski
- Release date: 10 November 1970
- Running time: 99 minutes
- Country: Poland
- Language: Polish

The Birch Wood (Polish: Brzezina) is a 1970 Polish drama film directed by Andrzej Wajda based on a novel by Jarosław Iwaszkiewicz. It was entered into the 7th Moscow International Film Festival where Wajda won the Golden Prize for Direction and Daniel Olbrychski won the award for Best Actor.

== Cast ==
- Olgierd Łukaszewicz - Stanislaw
- Daniel Olbrychski - Boleslaw
- Emilia Krakowska - Malina
- Marek Perepeczko - Michal
- Elzbieta Zolek - Ola
- Danuta Wodyńska - Katarzyna
