= The Days of Water =

1971 film

- Spanish: Los días del agua
- Directed by: Manuel Octavio Gómez
- Written by: Bernabé Hernández; Manuel Octavio Gómez
- Produced by: Miguel Mendoza
- Starring: Idalia Anreus
- Cinematography: Jorge Herrera
- Edited by: Nelson Rodriguez
- Music by: Leo Brouwer
- Production company: Instituto Cubano del Arte e Industria Cinematográficos
- Distributed by: Tricontinental Film Center; Kimbara Cine Cubano
- Release date: July 1971
- Running time: 110 minutes
- Country: Cuba
- Language: Spanish

The Days of Water (Spanish: Los días del agua) is a 1971 Cuban drama film directed by Manuel Octavio Gómez. It was entered into the 7th Moscow International Film Festival, where it won a Special Prize, the Prix FIPRESCI, and Idalia Anreus won the award for Best Actress.

== Plot ==
Based on actual events that occurred in 1936 in Cuba's Pinar Del Río, the film tells the story of Antoñica Izquierdo, a peasant who attributed healing powers through water.

== Cast ==
- Idalia Anreus as Antonica
- Raúl Pomares as Lino
- Adolfo Llauradó as Felipe
- Mario Balmaseda as Toni
- Eugenio Angel Dominguez as artist painting Jesus Christ

== Themes ==
Gómez described the film as a search for Cuba's own cultural values and for a “national, decolonizing, and revolutionary expression” of Cuban reality. The film's visual and ideological complexity has subsequently received scholarly attention. Laura Jaramillo highlights its treatment of ritual and popular belief and the tension between religious experience, political authority and revolutionary secularism. Oscar Quiros, in an article published in the journal Screen, discusses Manuel Octavio Gómez's Los días del agua (1971) as an example of "imperfect cinema” related to Julio García Espinosa’s definition. Quiros describes the film as a “rather convincing documentary-like feature film” and notes that its visual techniques create the impression that it was filmed before the invention of cinema. He also examines the film's characterization, describing Antoñica as “honest but simple minded,” the journalist as “sceptical and keen,” and the businessman as “unscrupulous.” Quiros interprets these characters as examples of the use of social types in imperfect cinema, in which characters embody particular qualities and social positions.
