= Great Spa Towns of Europe =

UNESCO World Heritage site

The Great Spa Towns of Europe
UNESCO World Heritage Site
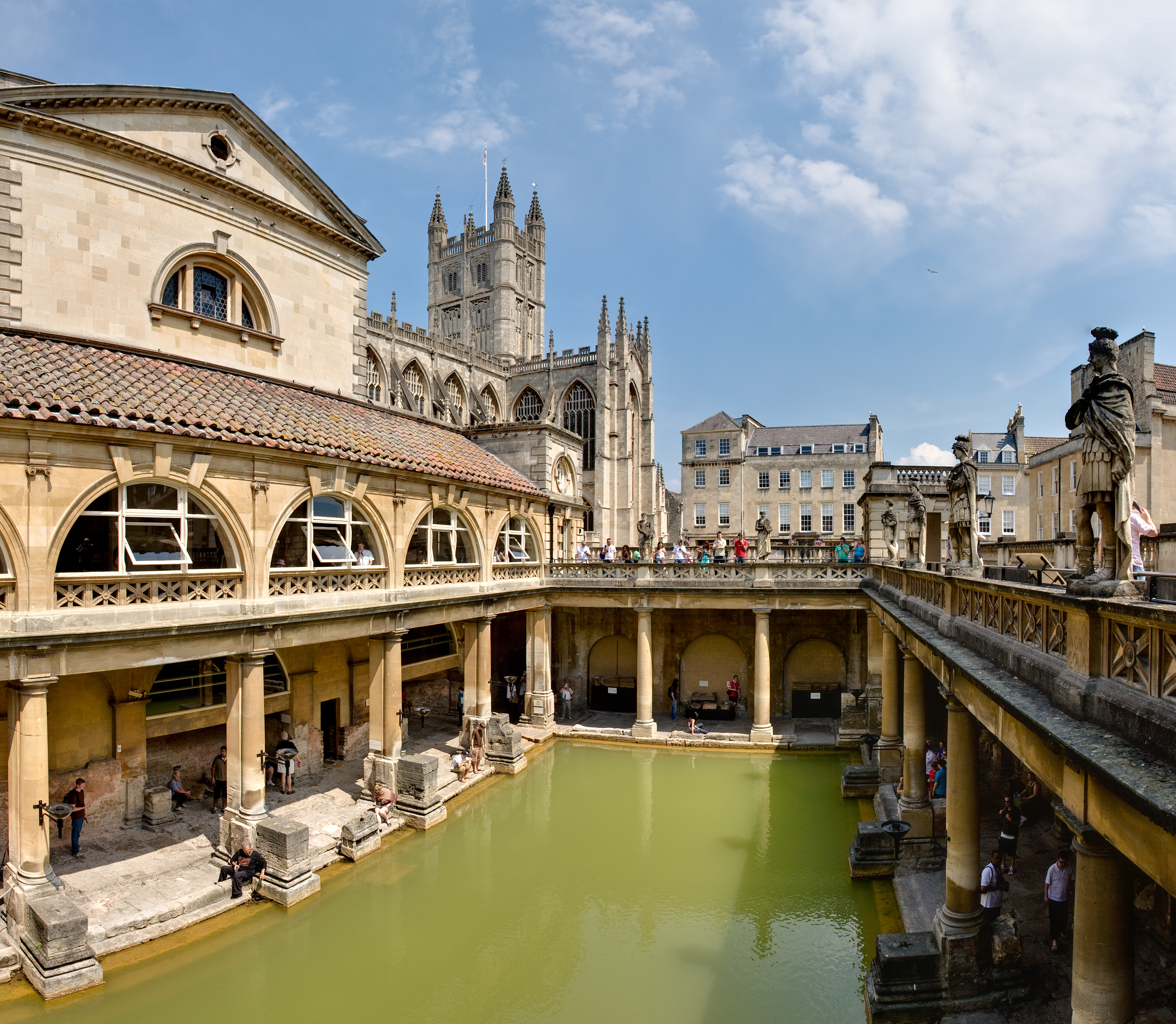
- The Roman Baths in Bath, England, one of the spa towns within the World Heritage Site
- Interactive map of The Great Spa Towns of Europe
- Location: Austria, Belgium, Czech Republic, France, Germany, Italy, United Kingdom
- Includes: Eleven spa towns in Europe
- Criteria: Cultural: (ii)(iii)
- Reference: 1613
- Inscription: 2021 (44th Session)
- Area: 7,014 ha (17,330 acres)
- Buffer zone: 11,319 ha (27,970 acres)

The Great Spa Towns of Europe is a transnational World Heritage Site consisting of a selection of 11 spa towns across seven European countries. They were developed around natural mineral water springs. From the early 18th century to the 1930s, Western Europe experienced an increase in spa and bathing culture, leading to the construction of elaborate bath houses. These would often include gardens, casinos, theatres, and villas surrounding the springs and the bath houses.

== Nomination ==
The city of Bath was originally inscribed on UNESCO's World Heritage List in 1987.

The efforts to get the Great Spas of Europe onto the World Heritage List began in 2012, and the nomination was submitted in 2019. On 24 July 2021, the Great Spas of Europe was officially inscribed on the World Heritage List.

== List of spa towns ==
Town	Country	ID	Picture
Baden bei Wien	Austria	1613-001	
Spa	Belgium	1613-002	
Františkovy Lázně	Czech Republic	1613-003	
Karlovy Vary	Czech Republic	1613-004	
Mariánské Lázně	Czech Republic	1613-005	
Vichy	France	1613-006	
Bad Ems	Germany	1613-007	
Baden-Baden	Germany	1613-008	
Bad Kissingen	Germany	1613-009	
Montecatini Terme	Italy	1613-010	
Bath	United Kingdom	1613-011	

== Map ==
The Great Spa Towns of Europe
The Great Spa Towns of Europe
1 Baden bei Wien
2 Spa
3 Františkovy Lázně
4 Karlovy Vary
5 Mariánské Lázně
6 Vichy
7 Bad Ems
8 Baden-Baden
9 Bad Kissingen
10 Montecatini Terme
11 Bath
