= Letters from the Park =

1988 film

- Directed by: Tomás Gutiérrez Alea
- Written by: Tomás Gutiérrez Alea
- Starring: Víctor Laplace
- Release date: 1988
- Running time: 87 minutes
- Country: Cuba
- Language: Spanish

Letters from the Park (Spanish: Cartas del parque) is a 1988 Cuban drama film directed by Tomás Gutiérrez Alea. The film was selected as the Cuban entry for the Best Foreign Language Film at the 61st Academy Awards, but was not accepted as a nominee.

== Cast ==
- Víctor Laplace
- Ivonne López Arenal
- Miguel Paneke
- Mirta Ibarra
- Adolfo Llauradó
- Elio Mesa
- Paula Ali

== See also ==
- List of submissions to the 61st Academy Awards for Best Foreign Language Film
- List of Cuban submissions for the Academy Award for Best Foreign Language Film
