= The Peasants (1973 film) =

Chłopi
- Directed by: Jan Rybkowski
- Written by: Jan Rybkowski; Ryszard Kosiński
- Starring: Władysław Hańcza; Emilia Krakowska; Krystyna Królówna; Ignacy Gogolewski
- Cinematography: Marek Nowicki
- Music by: Adam Sławiński
- Release date: 7 December 1973
- Running time: 166 minutes
- Country: Poland
- Language: Polish

The Peasants (Polish: Chłopi) is a Polish historical film directed by Jan Rybkowski. It was released in 1973. It is based on Władysław Reymont's novel of the same name.

This is a film version of the TV series Chłopi from 1972.

== Cast ==
- Władysław Hańcza as Maciej Boryna
- Emilia Krakowska as Jagna
- Ignacy Gogolewski as Antek
- Krystyna Królówna as Hanka
- Tadeusz Fijewski as Kuba
- Jadwiga Chojnacka as Dominikowa, Jagna's mother
- August Kowalczyk as mayor Piotr
- Franciszek Pieczka as parish priest
