= Aquaforum Lázně Františkovy Lázně =

Water park in the Czech Republic

Coordinates: 50°7′2″N 12°21′26″E

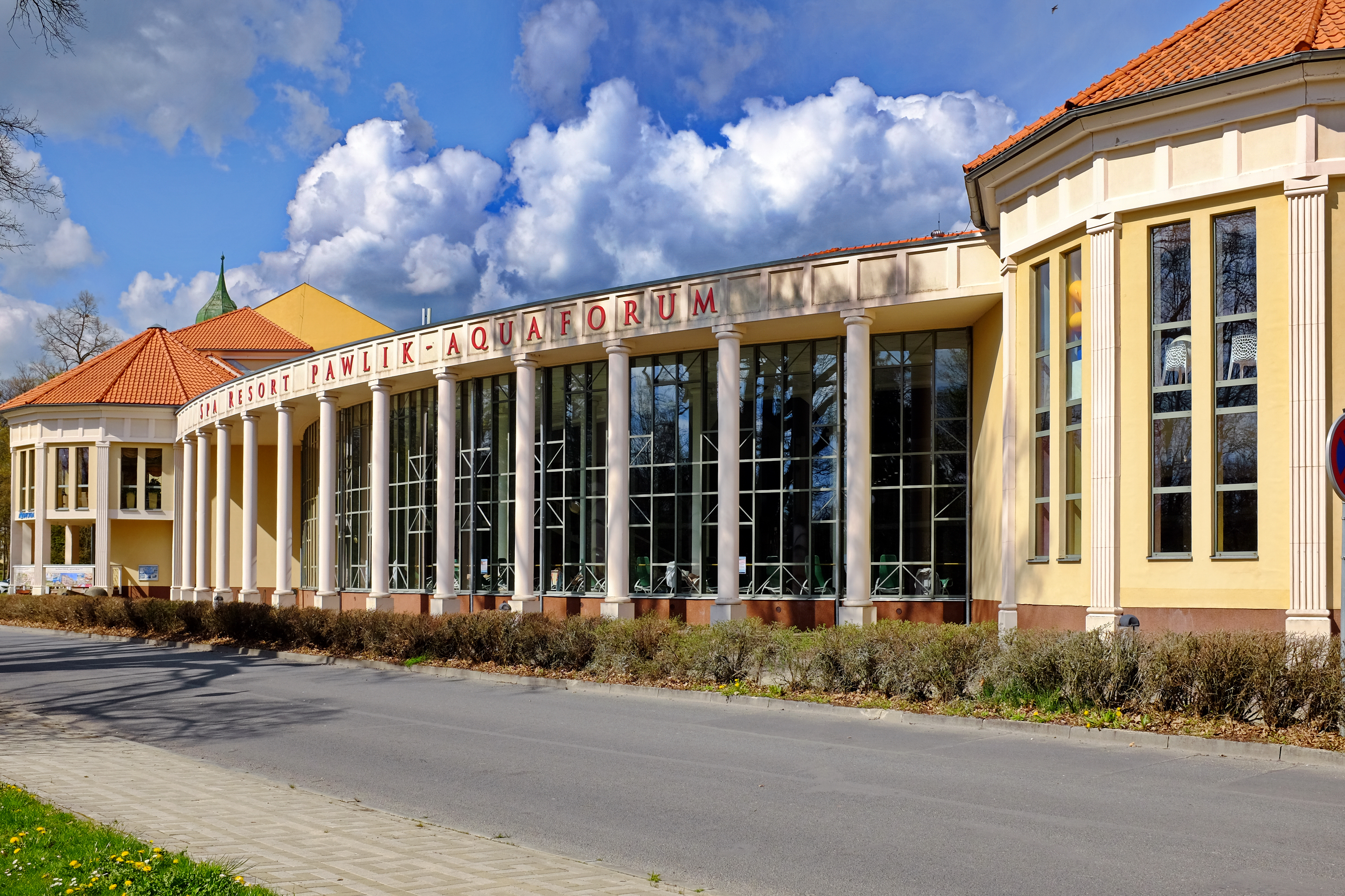
Entrance in 2021

Aquaforum Lázně Františkovy Lázně is a water park in Františkovy Lázně in the Karlovy Vary Region of the Czech Republic.

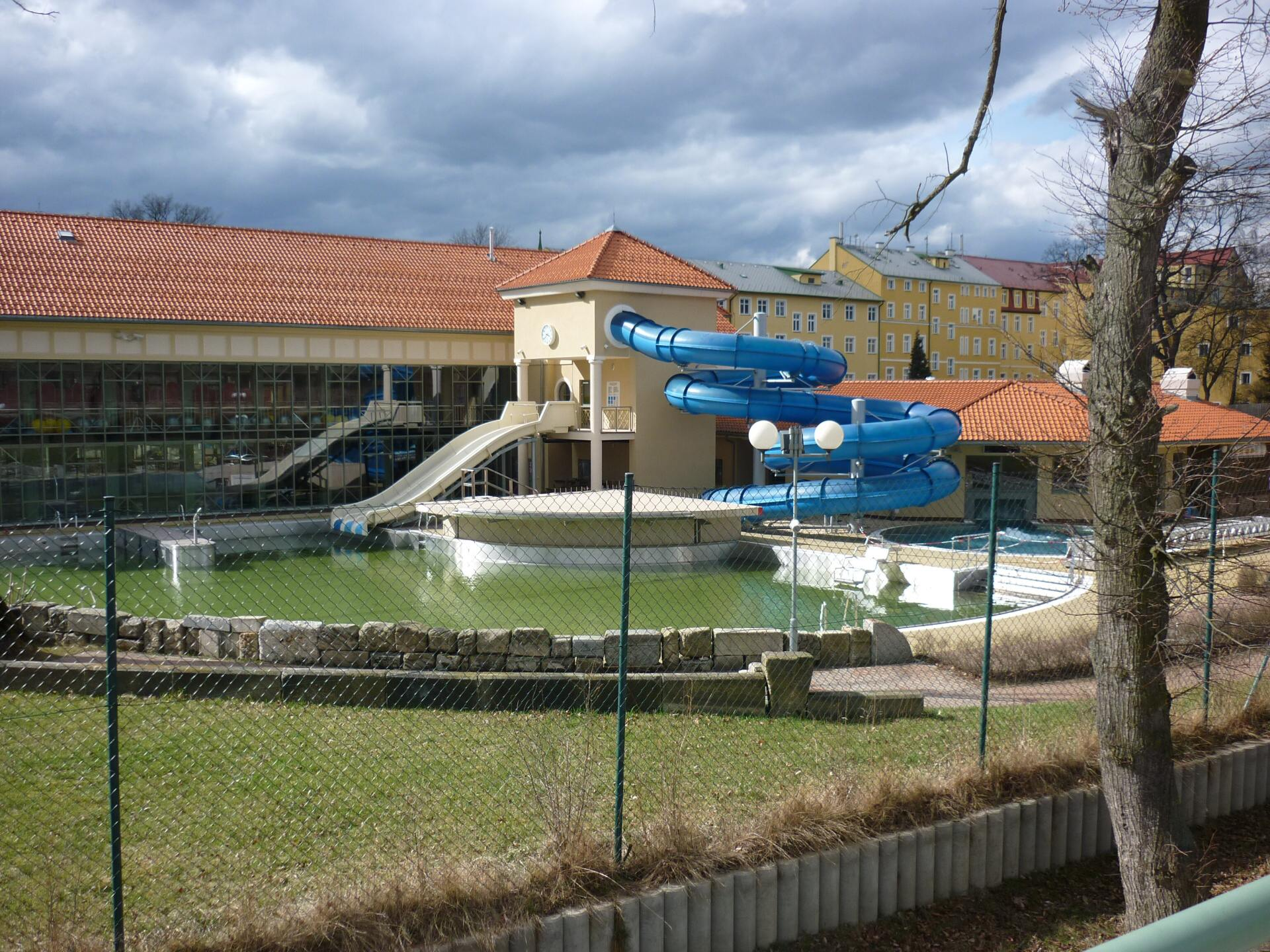
View of flume and slides
