= Božena Němcová Theatre =

Theatre in Františkovy Lázně, Czech Republic

Coordinates: 50°07′11″N 12°21′15″E

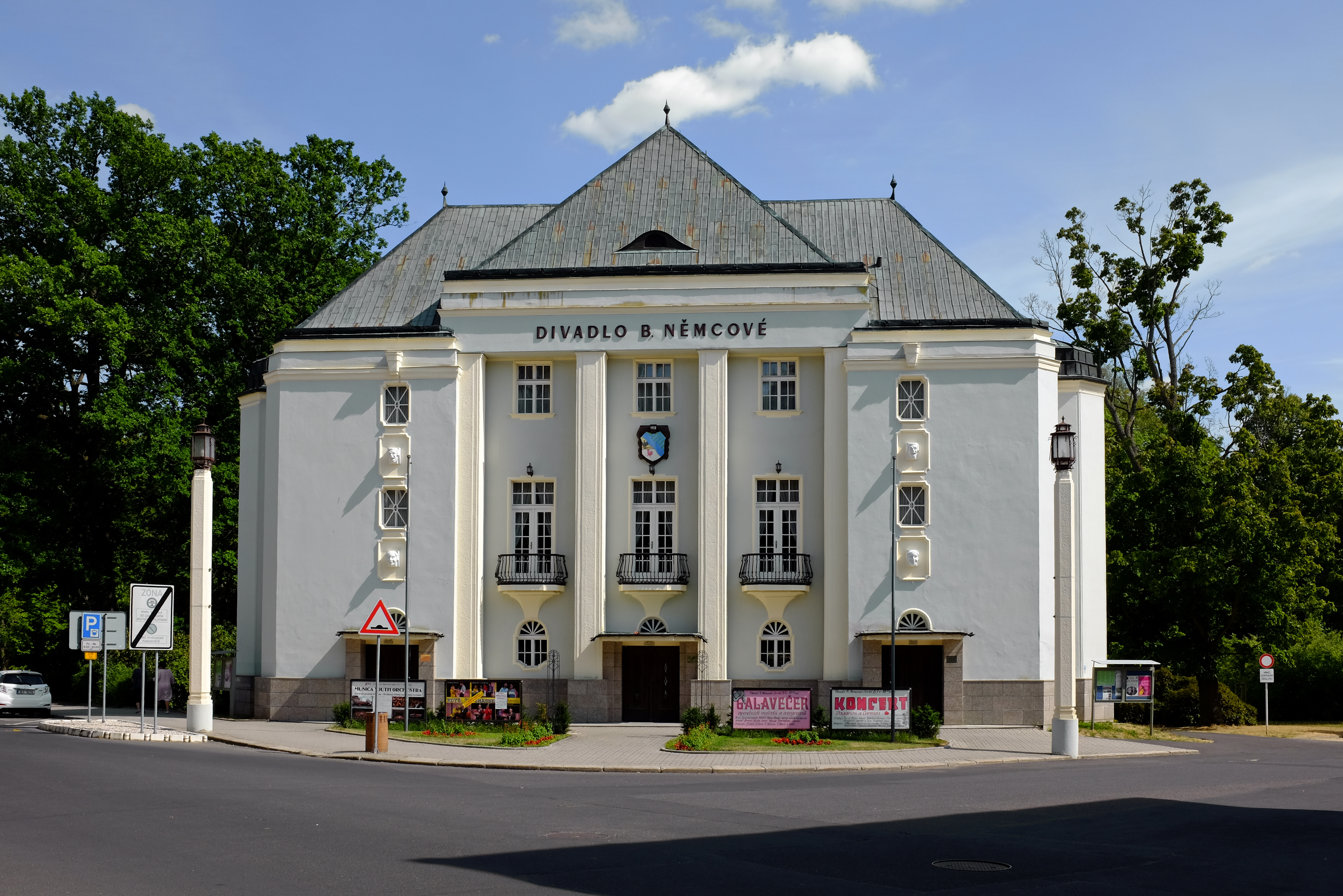
Front view

The Božena Němcová Theatre (Czech: Divadlo Boženy Němcové) is a theatre in Františkovy Lázně, Czech Republic.

== Location ==
The theatre is an isolated building at the edge of the town park with its façade facing the crossing of Ruská and Dr. Pohoreckého streets.

== History ==
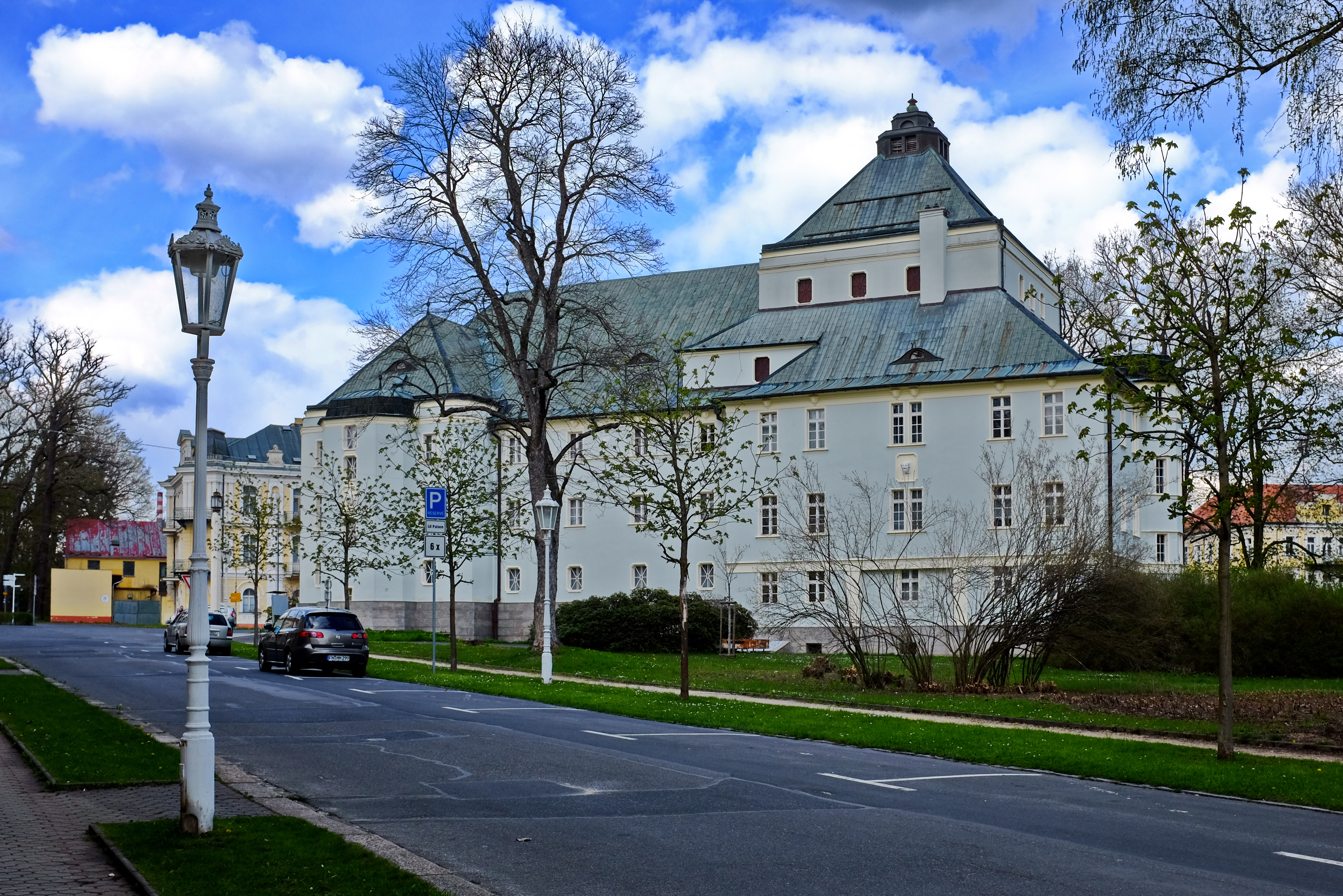
Side view

The theatre in the town was established in 1808 in a converted utility building. It operated during summer times of the spa season and in winters it returned to be a storage building.

In 1868, a special theatre building was built at the current location of the theatre. In 1927–1928 the new theatre building was built in the Neoclassical style under the direction of the chief architect Artur Payr and interiors were decorated in Art Deco style. It was named after Božena Němcová on 8 November 1962.

In 2018, the building was designated a cultural monument of the Czech Republic.
