= Bernhard Adler =

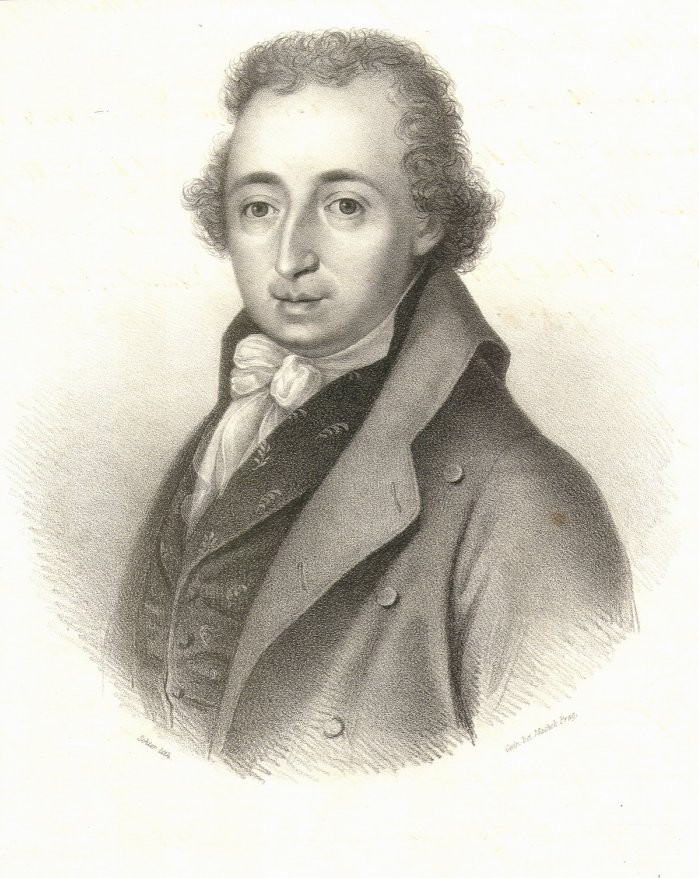
Bernhard Adler

Bernhard Vinzenz Adler (12 September 1753 – August 1810) was a German physician in Bohemia. He is the founder of the spa town of Franzensbad in West Bohemia, now known as Františkovy Lázně.

== Life ==
Adler was born at Eger, Habsburg monarchy (now Cheb, Czech Republic). As a graduate of the gymnasium, Adler studied medicine at the University of Vienna, funded by scholarships from the foundations of the city of Eger. In 1782, he earned his doctorate with his thesis De acidulis Egranus. In this chemico-medical treatise, he pointed out the healing power of the medicinal and gas springs rising at Schlada (now Slatina) near Eger in the regions swampy mineral-rich moorland, flowing through the meanders of the Schladabach.

=== Foundings ===
After a brief stint practicing as a physician in Vienna, Adler was appointed city physician (Stadtphysikus) in 1783, shortly afterwards Kreisphysikus and in 1793 well doctor. He is considered to be the founder of the spa town of Franzensbad (Františkovy Lázně), which developed with the support of Heinrich Franz von Rottenhan near the village of Schlada. The name Kaiser-Franzensdorf, named after the Austrian Emperor Francis II of Habsburg-Lorraine (1768-1835), was renamed Kaiser-Franzensbad in 1807, and was named after the end of the First World War and the Austro-Hungarian monarchy from 1918 onwards Franzensbad. After the end of the Second World War in 1945, the town was renamed to its Czech version, Františkovy Lázně.

In 1808, Adler had acquired the Gasquelle, from time immemorial called "the Polterer", the cold spring and the Louise source, along with the salt source in 1816 and the meadow source in 1820. He promoted the expansion of existing spa facilities and the accommodation for those seeking healing and promoted the transformation of the swampy moorland with paths and footbridges to well-known sources, from which water was drawn according to ancient law and brought to Eger. When Adler wanted to limit this right to collect water, in 1791 the Egerer Weibersturm ('Eger Women's Storm') occurred. The women who earned their livelihood by drawing, transporting and selling the water in Eger bitterly resisted his plans. They felt their water-carrying rights were threatened and obstructed his plans. The town council of Eger intervened and allowed the development to continue as a spa.

The result was a sophisticated recreational area, with easy access from the city of Eger. Johann Wolfgang von Goethe was one of its most famous guests in its early days, whose visits to Franzensbad were extensively reported on in Johannes Urzidil's book Goethe in Bohemia (1932, revised 1962 and 1965), and Ludwig van Beethoven, accompanied by Antonia Brentano and her family. Numerous aristocrats, especially Russian aristocrats, were patients of Franzensbad's doctors Anton Alois Palliardi, Paul Cartellieri, Lorenz von Köstler, and Josef Cartellieri, which bolstered the reputation of Franzensbad as an exclusive resort. Its reputation began to fade after the end of the First World War. Adler died in 1810 as a Royal Imperial Councillor.

=== Coat of arms ===
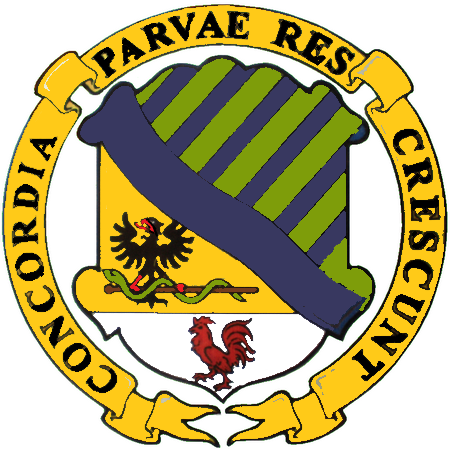
Coat of arms in honour of the founder and the sponsor

Kaiser-Franzensbad, the bathing triangle of what is now Karlovy Vary, Mariánské Lázně and Františkovy Lázně, the three famous spa resorts of West Bohemia, received full town rights in 1865 and adopted the former town seal as a town guard. The coat of arms recalled Adler and Heinrich Franz Graf von Rottenhan (1737–1809), the promoter of the construction of the health resort by the regional government in Prague in the time of its origin.

The coat of arms of the town of Franzensbad, which dates back to its granting of town privileges in 1852, is diagonally divided. The right half shows in green a corrugated bar, symbolizing a silver wavy river, which from the right upwards several rays as source flows. The left half shows, as a tribute to Adler, a black eagle, which holds in the catches the Rod of Asclepius as a sign of the healing arts. In the lower half is a red rooster, in memory of Heinrich Franz Graf von Rottenhan (died 1809), a large landowner in West Bohemia, Colonel Burggraf of the Kingdom of Bohemia and Minister of Justice, as well as his recognition for his benevolent cooperation in founding of Franzensbad.

The inscription on the coat of arms is: "CONCORDIA PARVAE RES CRESCUNT" (by Eintracht) and has similarity with the coat of arms of the Frankish noble family Rottenhan. In 1902, in the middle of the colonnade of the Colonnade, in honour of Adler, a monument erected was by Karl Wilfert the Elder was erected in front of the middle pavilion of the Colonnade.
