= Viva Cuba =

2005 film by Juan Carlos Cremata Malberti

- Directed by: Juan Carlos Cremata
- Written by: Juan Carlos Cremata Malberti; Manolito Rodriguez
- Produced by: Nicolas Duval-Adassovsky
- Starring: Luisa Maria Jiménez; Alberto Camilo Pujol Acosta
- Cinematography: Alejandro Pérez Gómez
- Edited by: Angélica Salvador Alonso; Sylvie Landra
- Music by: Slim Pezin; Amaury Ramírez Malberti
- Production companies: DDC Films; TVC Casa Productora; La Colmenita; El Ingenio; Cuban Institute of Radio and Television
- Release date: February 2005 (Cuba)
- Running time: 80 minutes
- Country: Cuba
- Language: Spanish

Viva Cuba is a 2005 Cuban tragicomedy film, directed and co-written by Juan Carlos Cremata, with Manolito Rodriguez as the other co-writer. It was the first Cuban film to be awarded the ‘Grand Prix Écrans Juniors’ for children's cinema at the 2005 Cannes Film Festival.

In Viva Cuba, a road movie fairy tale, Cremata tackles localized Cuban problems from the literal point of view of the country's children. He lowers the camera to the eye level of the film's protagonists, Malú (Malú Tarrau Broche) and Jorgito (Jorgito Miló Ávila).

== Background ==
Viva Cuba is a Cuban independent film that explores emigration and the effects it can have on children who have to leave friends and extended families behind. Youngsters are often uprooted without being consulted and then must contend with their new surroundings. In one scene, Malú and Jorgito discuss when they might reunite. The best they can hope for is to forget one another as their lives change and they face new pleasures and challenges. The viewer knows they are unlikely to ever see each other again, unless Malú's mother can be granted re-entry, which is extremely unlikely given the state of Cuban immigration laws.

== Plot ==
Viva Cuba takes place in Cuba and the two main characters are Malú, who comes from a middle-class family and is raised by her single mother, and Jorgito, whose mother is a poor socialist and his father an alcoholic. The film uses the two children from two different backgrounds to show how these children symbolize the people of Cuba and whether or not they can predict the outcomes of the future.

What neither woman recognizes is the immense strength of the bond between Malú and Jorgito. Following the death of Malú's grandmother, the children find out that Malú's mother is planning to leave Cuba to go to another country, where she has a boyfriend, Jorgito suggests they run away and travel to the other side of the island to find Malú's father and persuade him against signing the forms that would allow Malú and her mother to leave the country, followed by him saying that if they were to hug strongly, they would be inseparable, even if Malú were to leave Cuba.

Both children are seen preparing for the journey as their social statuses greatly contrast. Malú's clean clothes and her plastic drinking cup at breakfast and her toys are compared to Jorgito's uncleaned clothes and the use of a metal cup for breakfast. The two children embark on their journey, avoiding the police sent to search for the two of them. The disappearance of both children brings their mothers closer together in their grief.

Jorgito loses the map he brought with him, and tensions rise between the two children. Not to mention, Malú sang on stage at a festival that was broadcast over the air. The kids' parents saw Malú on TV and had the implication that Malú and Jorgito were, in fact, traveling towards the lighthouse. Jorgito then becomes infuriated with Malú.

They insult each other; Malú brings up Jorgito's social status, and Jorgito calls Malú's mother a slut. However, they were stuck with each other for the rest of the journey. One day, Malú gets hungry, and the two kids find a tent containing tons of food and goods, although they don't know who it belongs to. The kids fight over who gets to eat what food until the owner of the tent arrives, asking why they were trespassing. Malú explains their story, while she and Jorgito also try to explain that they didn't want to be friends anymore. The owner of the tent tells them that true friends always stay friends, even if they fight, causing Malú and Jorgito's bond to reform.

When they reach the lighthouse where Malú's father works, the forms have already been signed before she can persuade him otherwise. The parents (minus Malú's father), having reached the lighthouse before the kids got there, begin to beat their children and argue among each other. The two children run away from the fight and console each other on a cliff, as a large wave washes over them, and the film ends.

== Conclusion ==
After this tough and long journey, the children realize at the end that they cannot stop what is going to happen, just the same that the people of Cuba can fight for a change, and it probably will not happen. The children then run off and stand on top of a cliff, they hug, and the water storms on top of them. It can be implied that they jumped off because they were unhappy with the outcome. This symbolizing that the people of Cuba during this time were also still unhappy with the way things were going and that they could not change them. Another implied ending is that after the children hug they jump off the cliff and commit suicide. The end of the film is unknown as to what exactly happened whether the children lived or died, just as the future of Cuba during that time was unknown as to whether things would become better or worse. The children symbolize how people of Cuba were reacting during that time. They were unaware of exactly how the past will impact their future and just how drastic those changes will be for the future of Cuba.

== Reception ==
The film became a box office hit and went on to win many awards nationally and internationally as it was displayed at many film festivals around the world, including 2005 Cannes Film Festival, where it won the Grand Prix Ecrans Juniors Award, plus awards in countries as diverse as Australia, Italy, Guatemala, Germany, France, and Taiwan. In 2008, it was shown all over Venezuela. The film was screened at the Sonoma County Cuban Film Festival in Sebastopol, CA, in July 2015.

== Awards ==
Viva Cuba won 34 national and international awards in all, including:

- Grand Prix Ecrans Juniors, Cannes, 2005
- Best Film award at the International Children Cinema and Television Festival in Taiwan.
- Special Mention, Cinecircoli Giovanili Socioculturale. Giffoni International Film Festival, Italia, 2005.
- Premio en las categorías de dirección, guión, dirección de fotografía y edición. Premio Caracol. UNEAC, 2005.
- Premio especial otorgado por la Unión de Pioneros José Martí. UNEAC, 2005.
- Premio de ayuda à la distribución. XIII Festival de Cine de españa y América Latina. Bélgica, 2005.
- Premio à la Mejor Edición. VIII Festival de Cine Infantil. Guayana, Venezuela, 2005.
- Premio à la Mejor Película. VIII Festival de Cine Infantil. Guayana, Venezuela, 2005.
- Reconocimiento Especial de la Agencia Internacional de Noticias Prensa Latina. 27 Festival Internacional del Nuevo Cine Latinoamericano. La Habana, Cuba, 2005.
- Premio del Oyente de la Emisora radio Progreso. 27 Festival Internacional del Nuevo Cine Latinoamericano. La Habana, Cuba, 2005.
