= Carlos Diaz (theater director) =

Cuban theatre director

- Born: Havana, Cuba
- Movement: Cuban culture Performing arts theater

Carlos Diaz is a Cuban theatre director. Diaz studied dramaturgy and theatre at Havana's Superior Institute of Art (ISA). He started his career as a theatre and art critic and later took on the role of director. He is the director of theatre company Teatro El Publico.

== History ==
After founding the theatre company Teatro El Publico in 1992, Diaz's first production billed "North American Theatre Trilogy" featured two plays by Tennessee Williams (The Glass Menagerie and A Streetcar Named Desire), and one play by Robert Anderson (Tea and Sympathy). His company, which operates out of Trianon Theatre on Calle Linea, has premiered over 40 plays in the last 15 years and has become a Havana institution.

His work also includes the short stories "The Wolf," "The Forest and the New Man," and "Strawberry and Chocolate" of Cuban writer Senel Paz, which Diaz developed into plays, emphasizing the sensuality, expressiveness, and Cuban-ness of the stories. The play was then adapted into a film in 1994, starring the same actor Vladimir Cruz.

In 1985, at the Ensayo Theatre, and again in 2007 at the El Publico Theatre, Diaz directed the Jean-Paul Sartre play The Respectful Prostitute; Sartre was an early and enthusiastic supporter of the Cuban revolution. Diaz also directed Federico García Lorca's play The Audience, which Lorca began working on in Cuba in 1929. Its opening in Havana in 1994 caused a scandal as it portrayed the theme of homosexuality. Diaz chose to perform the controversial play a second time in 1996 and then again in 1998.

Despite its Cuban emphasis, El Publico has found success during its trips to Ecuador (1994), Spain (1997), Colombia (1998), and Venezuela (2000). It has also toured throughout Cuba, and it's currently performing in a temporary location at theatre Adolofo Llayrado Theater on Calle 11, while its usual theatre, El Publico, is renovated.
