= The Key (1971 film) =

1971 film

- Directed by: Vladimír Čech
- Written by: Kamil Pixa; Vladimír Čech
- Starring: František Vicena
- Cinematography: Václav Hunka
- Release date: 14 May 1971
- Running time: 85 minutes
- Country: Czechoslovakia
- Language: Czech

The Key (Czech: Klíč) is a 1971 Czechoslovak drama film directed by Vladimír Čech. It was entered into the 7th Moscow International Film Festival where it won a Silver Prize.

== Cast ==
- František Vicena as Jan Zika
- Wilhelm Koch-Hooge as Friedrich
- Zdenek Kampf as Nergl
- Vlasta Vlasáková as Milada
- Eva Jirousková as Blazena Preislerová
- Oldřich Velen as Josef Preisler
- Jürgen Frohriep as Nemecký chirurg
- Miloslav Holub as Jankovský
- Alena Hessová as Ziková
- Josef Chvalina as Doktor
