= Vlasta Fialová =

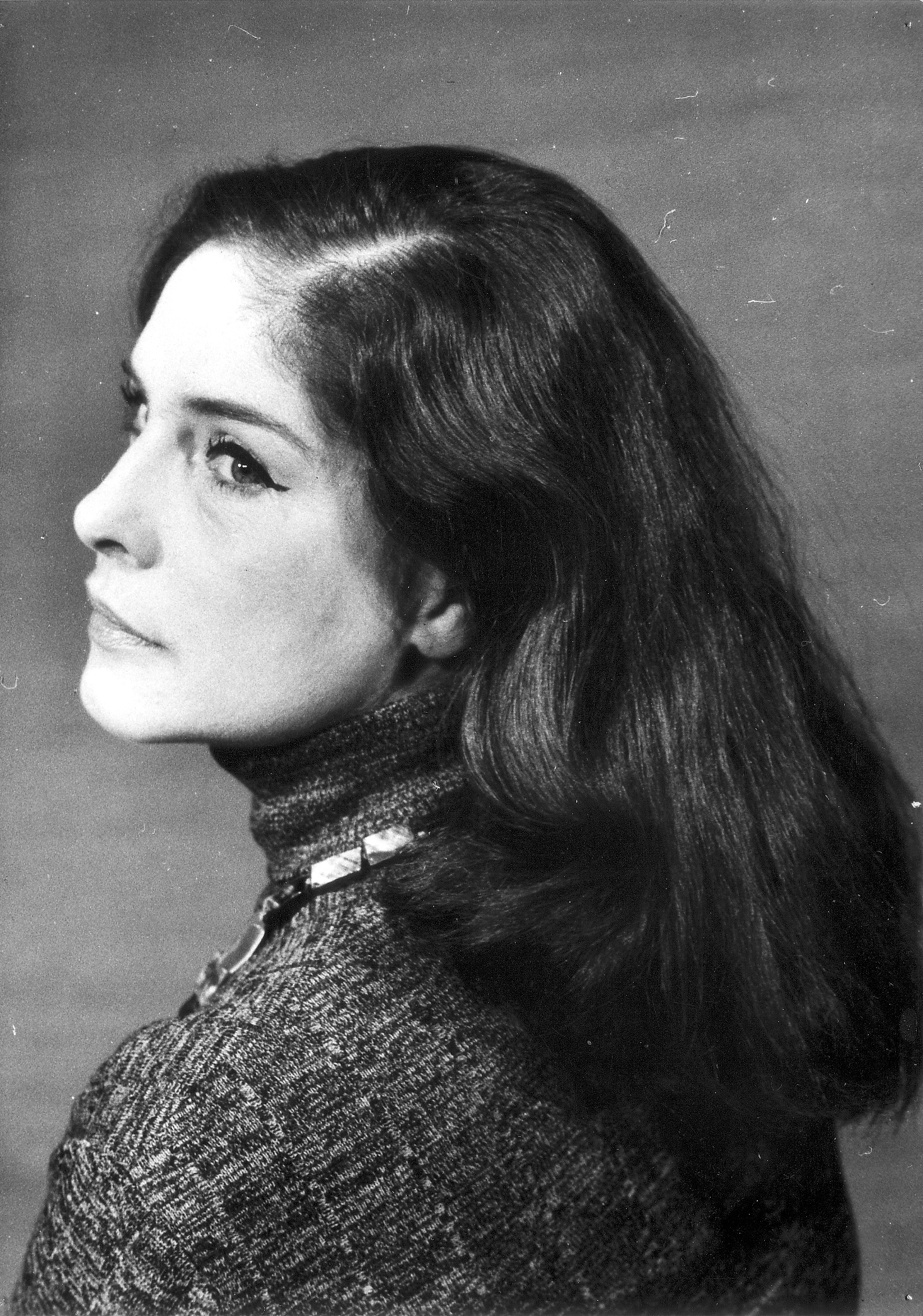
Vlasta Fialová

Vlasta Fialová (20 January 1928 – 13 January 1998) was a Czech film and stage actress, and educator. She is best known for the role of the protagonist in the film Wild Bára. Nearly entire her theatrical career, since 1950 to her death, is associated with the National Theatre Brno. In 1964 she was awarded the honorary title of the Merited Artist of Chechoslovakia.

In 2006 a documentary Tichý život Divé Báry about her was released by Czech Television.
