= Juan Carlos Cremata Malberti =

Cuban film director

Juan Carlos Cremata Malberti (born November 18, 1961, in Havana, Cuba) is a Cuban film director. He started his career as an author and actor for children's TV shows made for the Cuban Institute of Radio and Television from 1981 to 1987. He is known for directing the movie Viva Cuba, which received the Best Children's Film award at the Cannes International Film Festival in 2005.

== Biography ==
=== Childhood ===
Cremata Malberti grew up in Havana's Vedado district, with his mother Iraida Malberti Cabrera, a choreographer and film director who used to work in children's television. He obtained his Dramatic Arts degree in 1986 from the Havana's Superior Institute of Art. He then went on to study at and graduate from the International Film School of San Antonio de los Baños in 1990, having already created his classic Oscuros Rinocerontes Enjaulados, an experimental short film that went around the world gathering awards in several film festivals.

=== Teaching Experience ===
Between 1994 and 1995, Cremata Malberti taught editing and directing in Buenos Aires. In 1996, he became a Guggenheim fellow and spent a year in New York City. Then, in 1998, he was invited to participate in a film-writing workshop at the Sundance Institute in Utah.

=== Film Making ===
After writing and acting for children's TV shows for 6 years, Cremata Malberti dedicated his career to feature-length films. His specialty is bittersweet comedies, depicting the Cuban society, its roots and its daily life.

Cremata Malberti's first commercial film was the documentary La época, El encanto y Fin de siglo made in 2000.

His first feature film was Nada in 2001. This film was noted within the Cuban film industry for its innovative mise en scène. The movie tells the story of Carla, a woman living in Havana, who gets a visa to go to the United States but suddenly realizes that happiness may not be where she thinks it is. This first film features autobiographical details, including the film's setting in Havana's Vedado district.

Nada was supposed to have been followed by Nadie (Nobody) and Nunca (Never), but Cremata Malberti didn't get the financing for his trilogy project.

Fame came to Juan Carlos Cremata when Viva Cuba was released in 2005, and won more than 30 national and international awards. It was the first Cuban film to be awarded, “Grand Prix Écrans Juniors” for children's cinema at the 2005 Cannes International Film Festival.

His latest film, El Premio Flaco, adapted from Cuban writer Hector Quintero's play, tells the story of a woman whose luck changes drastically when she wins a contest sponsored by a soap company. This low-budget film received a hearty welcome for his premiere at the Havana Film Festival.

== Awards ==
Cremata Malberti has won many awards for his various films.

=== Viva Cuba ===
Viva Cuba has won 34 prizes, including

- Grand Prix Ecrans Juniors, Cannes, 2005
- Best Film award at the International Children Cinema and Television Festival in Taiwan.
- Special Mention, Cinecircoli Giovanili Socioculturale. Giffoni International Film Festival, Italia, 2005.
- Premio a la Mejor Edición. VIII Festival de Cine Infantil. Guayana, Venezuela, 2005.
- Reconocimiento Especial de la Agencia Internacional de Noticias Prensa Latina. 27 Festival Internacional del Nuevo Cine Latinoamericano. La Habana, Cuba, 2005.

=== Nada ===
Nada has won 19 prizes, including

- Premio Coral de Opera prima at the 23rd Festival Internacional del Nuevo Cine Latinoamericano, La Havana, Cuba, 2001.
- Best edition prize at the 14th Cinemafest San Juan, Puerto Rico.
- Caracol UNEAC prize for best director, 2002.
- Shortlisted for "la Quinzaine des Réalisateurs” at Cannes International Film Festival, 2002.
- Best feature-length film at the International Festival of Miami, United States, 2003.

=== Oscuros Rinocerontes Enjaulados ===
- Gran Premio "El Chicuelo". IV Festival de Cine Joven, La Habana, Cuba
- Premio "Saúl Yelín" de la Federación Nacional de Cine Clubes de Cuba. 1990.
- Premio "Yara". Centro Cinematográfico. La Habana, 1990.
- Grand Prize EISENSTEIN at the Wilhelmshaven International Film Festival, Germany, 1992.
- Archived at Museum of Modern Art (MOMA), 1996.

== Filmography ==
- 1984-1987
  - Cuando yo sea grande (30 episodes): Children's TV series for Cuban television
  - Y dice una mariposa... (25 episodes): Children's TV series for Cuban television
  - Diana (short film)
- 1991: Oscuros Rinocerontes Enjaulados (short film)
- 1999: La época, el encanto y fin de siglo (documentary)
- 2002: Nada (feature)
- 2005: Viva Cuba (feature)
- 2009: El premio Flaco (feature)

== See also ==
- Cuban cinema
