= Jane Skok =

Jane Skok is the Sandra and Edward H. Meyer Professor of Radiation Oncology at New York University.

== Biography ==
Skok was born in Johannesburg. She earned a PhD at University College London in immunology and genetics. After completing her PhD, she left science to care for her two children, one of whom was chronically ill.

Ten years later and with four children, Skok decided that she would return to science by completing a master's degree in immunology at Imperial College London.

In 1999, she was awarded a Wellcome Trust Career Re-entry Fellowship, and started doing postdoctoral research at the Medical Research Center in Imperial College with Amanda Fisher. In 2002, she became a senior lecturer in the Department of Immunology and Molecular Pathology at University College London. In 2006, she moved to New York and became an assistant professor of pathology at NYU School of Medicine. She was promoted to full professor in 2014. Since 2017, she has been the Sandra and Edward Meyer Chair of Radiation Oncology.

Hurricane Sandy destroyed much of Skok's research in 2013. Her lab was shut down for ten months, and relocated to NYU's Washington Square campus.
