= The Magic Tree (TV series) =

2004 Polish TV series

- Country of origin: Poland
- Original language: Polish
- No. of episodes: 7

Production
- Running time: 27 minutes

Original release
- Network: TVP Polonia
- Release: April 10, 2004 – 2006

The Magic Tree (Polish: Magiczne drzewo, pronounced Polish pronunciation: [maˈɡitʂnɛ ˈdʐɛvɔ]) is an International Emmy Award-winning Polish-produced television series that ran from 2004 to 2006 on Telewizja Polska, directed by Andrzej Maleszka. A movie continuation under the same title was produced in 2009. A book series, consisting of ten books was also published:

- Czerwone Krzesło (The Red Chair)
- Tajemnica Mostu (Mystery of the Bridge)
- Olbrzym (Giant)
- Pojedynek (Duel)
- Gra (Game)
- Cień Smoka (Shadow of the Dragon)
- Świat Ogromnych (World of the Giants)
- Inwazja (Invasion)
- Berło (The Scepter)
- Czas Robotów (Time of the Robots)

A spin-off series has been made (Bohaterowie Magicznego Drzewa (The Heroes of the Magic Tree)), currently containing one book: Porwanie (The Abduction).

== Plot overview ==
The series follows the story of a magical oak tree whose special properties are unknown to the world until it is cut down and turned into a variety of items.

== Episodes ==
Episode #	Title
TV SERIES
01	Drewniany pies ("The Wooden Dog")
02	Kostka ("The Dice")
03	Kredka ("The Crayon")
04	Berło ("The Sceptre")
05	Bracia ("Brothers")
06	Para ("A pair")
07	Połykacze książek ("Bookworms")
MOVIE
	Magiczne drzewo ("The Magic Tree")

== Awards ==
- 2007 International Emmy Awards
  - Won: Children and Young People Award

For the first episode Drewniany pies ("The Wooden Dog"):

- 2004 Chicago International Children's Film Festival
  - Won: Children's Jury Award - Certificate of Merit: Live-Action Television Production
  - 2nd place: "Adult's Jury Award": Live-Action Television Production
