= Jorge Ruffinelli =

Uruguayan academic and critic (1943–2026)

Jorge Enrique Ruffinelli Altesor
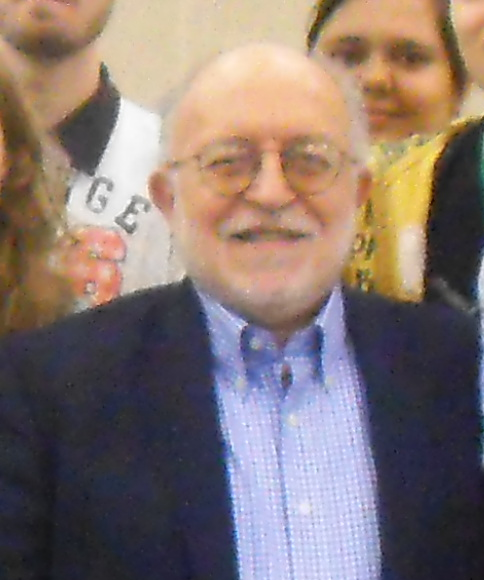
- Ruffinelli in 2012
- Born: December 16, 1943; Montevideo, Uruguay
- Died: February 4, 2026 (aged 82)
- Education: Facultad de Letras de la UDELAR (Uruguay)
- Occupations: Writer, literary critic, researcher, college professor: Associate Professor at the University of Buenos Aires (1973); Professor at the University Veracruzana (1974); Full Professor at Stanford University (1986)
- Spouse: Cristina Meneghetti
- Children: Alvaro, Andrea, Gerardo, Paula
- Relatives: Parents: Augustine Ruffinellis, Selika Altesor
- Writing career
- Notable works: La sonrisa de Gardel, Montevideo: Trilce (2004); Víctor Gaviria, los márgenes al centro, Madrid: Turner / Casa de América, 2ª edición (2005), Universidad de Guadalajara (2009); Sueños de realidad. Fernando Pérez: tres décadas de cine, Alcalá: Universidad de Alcalá/FNCL (2005); El cine de Patricio Guzmán, en busca de las imágenes verdaderas, Santiago de Chile: Uqbar Editores (2008); América Latina en 130 películas. Santiago de Chile, Uqbar Editores (2010); América Latina en 130 documentales. Santiago de Chile, Uqbar Editores (2012).
- Notable awards: 1980: Premio Nacional de Ensayo, Instituto de Bellas Artes/Casa de la Cultura Gómez Palacio, por su libro Literatura e ideología: el primer Mariano Azuela; 2008: Premio Salon Rouge, Asociación de Críticos Cinematográficos de Uruguay - FIPRESCI.

Jorge Enrique Ruffinelli Altesor (December 16, 1943 – February 4, 2026) was a Uruguayan academic and critic.

== Life and career ==
In his youth, Ruffinelli was a disciple of Ángel Rama and a contributor to the weekly Marcha. He fled to Argentina during Uruguay's military dictatorship. There, he taught at Universidad de Buenos Aires.

Later, he was professor of Latin American Literature at the Universidad Veracruzana and Stanford University.

Ruffinelli was considered an expert in Latin American cinema and participated as a jury member in several international festivals. He died on February 4, 2026, at the age of 82. He was working on Encyclopaedia of Latin American Cinema at the time of his death.

== Works ==
- Paradise Lost of Gained: The Literature of Hispanic Exile (co-edited with Fernando Alegria, Arte Público Press, 1991)
- La sonrisa de Gardel (Trilce, 2004)
- América Latina en 130 películas (Uqbar, 2010)
- Encyclopaedia of Latin American Cinema (unfinished)
