= Vladimír Čech (director) =

Czech film director

- Born: 25 September 1914; České Budějovice, Bohemia, Austria-Hungary (now Czech Republic)
- Died: 2 February 1992 (aged 77); Prague, Czechoslovakia
- Occupations: Film director, screenwriter
- Years active: 1939–1980

Vladimír Čech (25 September 1914 – 2 February 1992) was a Czechoslovak film director and screenwriter. He directed more than 35 films between 1941 and 1980. His 1971 film The Key was entered into the 7th Moscow International Film Festival where it won the Silver Prize.

== Selected filmography ==
- Divá Bára (1949)
- The Key (1971)
