= Heidi Skok =

American singer

- Born: Heidi Skok; June 19, 1968 (age 58); Richmond Heights, Ohio, US
- Education: Carnegie Mellon University, Duquesne University
- Occupations: Opera (soprano, mezzo-soprano and contralto); Singing teacher
- Years active: 1991–

Heidi Skok is an American operatic soprano, mezzo-soprano and contralto who has had a career in concerts and in operas since the early 1990s. She has performed with many leading opera companies and orchestras in the United States and in other countries around the world.

== Early life and education ==
Heidi Skok was born on June 19, 1968, in Richmond Heights in Ohio, US. Her father was a probate judge and her mother is a retired court reporter. At Riverside High School, Skok acted in musicals and won a Lake County Rotary award for best lead actress in a musical. She graduated from Carnegie Mellon University in Pittsburgh.

== Career ==
Skok's vocal career began professionally in 1990 with the Pittsburgh Opera under the management and guardianship of Tito Capobianco. She sang secondary soprano parts at the Metropolitan Opera from 1991 to 2003. Skok sang mostly under the baton of James Levine in German, Czech, English, and Russian operas.

She was a member of the Metropolitan Opera's Young Artist Development program from 1991 to 1994 and from 1998 to 2003, was on the MET's roster as a Soprano. Skok sang regionally as well, including major roles as Pamina, Donna Elvira, the Countess, Gretel, Fiordiligi, and Michaela with Pittsburgh Opera, Lyric Opera of Kansas City, and Wolf Trap opera and others. She has sung many recitals including at the Ravinia Festival and the Marlboro Festival.

In 2003 the Metropolitan Opera retired her soprano voice. During her soprano career, Skok appeared in many concert halls around the world, including the Carnegie Hall in New York City, Jordan Hall in Boston and The 92nd Street Y in New York City. She sang as a soprano on four different continents overall. She sang at concerts in Argentina, Austria, Israel, Italy, and Uruguay.

In 2006, while singing with the Albany Symphony conducted by Maestro David Janower, Skok and Maestro Janower found the soprano repertoire of course less navigable and Skok started performing as a Mezzo-soprano. She sang successfully at Carnegie Hall as a Mezzo and many other concerts. Through further vocal development however, the Mezzo-soprano still felt the repertoire to be a bit high and in 2021, Skok embraced the Contralto repertoire with ease. Skok has been on many voice faculties at conservatories and universities since 1995 including The New School University, Bennington College, The University of Kentucky, The New England Conservatory, Oberlin College Conservatory, The College of Saint Rose and Lakeland Community College. She won awards including The Center for Contemporary Opera, The MET National Council auditions (regional) Opera Index and The Center for Contemporary Opera and a Sullivan Award from Opera America.

Skok returned to professional opera in February 2023, when she sang as a contralto in St. Augustine, Florida.

== Singing teacher ==
Skok started a company, Skok Studio LLC, in 1995. There she was able to offer her vocal programmes to everyone who was interested in, she was doing that both online and in person. At the same time she had diverse roles transitioning from a celebrated soprano to a professional contralto in 2021. She founded Resonanz Opera in 2009. She is the founder of Resonanz Opera which began in 2009 in Albany, New York and transferred to Mentor, Ohio in 2017 where it had two successful seasons helping opera singers from around the country in a summer operatic season.

Skok is the owner and master Vocal Instructor at Skokstudio Vocal Instruction LLC, an online vocal instruction business that helps singers across the country improve their singing skills.
