= Idalia Anreus =

Cuban actress (1932–1998)

- Born: 1932; Sagua La Grande, Cuba
- Died: January 3, 1998 (aged 65–66); Elizabeth, New Jersey, United States
- Occupation: Actress
- Years active: Early 1960s-1983

Idalia Anreus (1932 – January 3, 1998) was a Cuban actress who worked in both theatre and film. A self-taught actress, she began working in children's theatre through her younger sister, theatre actress Gladys Anreus. In the late 1960s and early 1970s she worked in the Teatro Estudio theatre group, and by the late 1970s she had moved on to the Teatro Politico Bertold Brecht group.

In 1968 she married film director Manuel Octavio Gómez; she would appear in leading roles in many of his films. Her first film was the 1966 La salación, a comedy directed by her future husband, where two of her sisters, Dinorah and Nereyda also acted. She appeared in eleven films between 1966 and 1983. Throat cancer forced her retirement from acting by the mid-1980s. She died of a heart attack when she was visiting her sisters in Elizabeth, New Jersey.

She won the award for Best Actress at the 7th Moscow International Film Festival for her role in Los dias del agua.

== Filmography ==
Year	Title	Role	Notes
1966	La salación		
1967	Tulipa		
1968	Lucía		
1968	La odisea del General José		
1969	La primera carga al machete		
1971	Los dias del agua	Antonica	
1975	Ustedes tienen la palabra		
1976	Un día de noviembre		Uncredited
1978	Una mujer, un hombre, una ciudad...		
1979	Retrato de Teresa		
1981	Guardafronteras		
1983	El señor presidente		
