= Manuel Octavio Gómez =

Cuban film director (1934–1988)

- Born: November 14, 1934
- Died: January 2, 1988 (aged 53)
- Occupations: Film director and writer

Manuel Octavio Gómez (November 14, 1934 – January 2, 1988) was a prolific Cuban film director and writer. He began his career making documentaries during the first years of the ICAIC before moving increasingly into fiction. He is better known for his seminal 1969 Cuban film The First Charge of the Machete. His 1971 film The Days of Water won the Prix FIPRESCI at the Moscow International Film Festival.

== Career ==
Gómez's transition from documentary to fiction was accompanied by an increasing interest in historical subjects and in the relationship between individual experience and broader social change. His films frequently combined documentary conventions with staged fiction. This approach became particularly pronounced in La primera carga al machete, which reconstructs an episode from the Ten Years' War while using techniques associated with documentary and cinéma vérité. Scholar Santiago Juan-Navarro has characterized the film as a seminal work of Cuban revolutionary cinema and a landmark of Latin American experimental film. He has analyzed Gómez's use of documentary-style interviews, direct sound, handheld camerawork and a pseudo-verité aesthetic, as well as the film's use of historical reconstruction to connect the events of the nineteenth century with the political present in which it was produced. The visual style of the film has been closely associated with the contributions of cinematographer Jorge Herrera. A retrospective presented by the University of Zaragoza quotes filmmaker and camera technician Adriano Moreno as attributing much of the film's status to the collaboration between Gómez and Herrera.

Gómez's next film The Days of Water (1971) was based on events surrounding Antoñica Izquierdo, a peasant woman in pre-revolutionary Cuba who became known for attributing healing powers to water. The film starred Idalia Anreus and used popular religious practice and ritual as central elements of its narrative. Laura Jaramillo's study of Gómez's cinema argues that The Days of Water uses ritual performance and popular mythology to explore the relationship between revolution, superstition and cultural identity. The study also places the film within debates surrounding the concept of "imperfect cinema", arguing that it expands the concept beyond more explicitly militant forms of revolutionary filmmaking.

== Filmography ==
- Story of a Battle (Historia de una batalla) - 1962
- Cuentos del Alhambra - 1963
- El encuentro - 1964
- La salación - 1966
- Tulipa - 1967
- The First Charge of the Machete (La primera carga al machete) - 1969
- The Days of Water (Los días del agua) - 1971
- You Have the Floor (Ustedes tienen la palabra) - 1973
- The Earth and the Sky (La tierra y el cielo) - 1976
- Woman, Man, City (Una mujer, un hombre, una ciudad...) - 1978
- Patakin Means Fable (¡Patakín! quiere decir ¡fábula!) - 1981
- Mr. President (El señor presidente) - 1983
- Gallego - 1988
