= Božena Němcová =

Czech writer

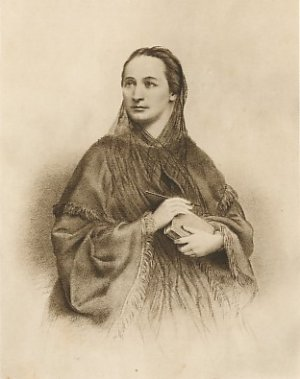
- Engraving of Němcová by Jan Vilímek
- Born: Barbora Novotná; 4 February 1820 ? Vienna, Austrian Empire
- Died: 21 January 1862 (aged 41); Prague, Bohemia, Austrian Empire
- Resting place: Vyšehrad Cemetery
- Occupation: Writer
- Spouse: Josef Němec (m. 1837)
- Children: Hynek Němec; Karel Němec; Theodora Němcova; Jaroslav Němec
- Writing career
- Notable works: Divá Bára; Babička; V zámku a v podzámčí; Chyže pod horami
- Literary movement: Czech National Revival

Božena Němcová (Czech pronunciation: [ˈboʒɛna ˈɲɛmt͡sovaː]; 4 February 1820 – 21 January 1862) was a Czech writer of the final phase of the Czech National Revival movement. Her "first published work was a patriotic poem, 'To the Bohemian Women', which brought her to the attention of a circle of writers and intellectuals in Prague, who were enthralled by 'her charming directness and her marvellous mind'". When her novel Babička "was published in 1855, it was quickly recognized as a classic and became the foundational work of modern Czech literature".

Her image is featured on the 500 CZK denomination of the Česká koruna, "the Czech Republic's five-hundred crown note".

== Biography ==
According to the dating up to now accepted by the majority of Czech authors, Božena Němcová was born in 1820 as Barbara Pankl (or Barbora Panklová according to the usual Czech name-giving for women) in Vienna as a daughter of Johann Pankl from Lower Austria and Teresie Novotná, a maid of Bohemian origin. In her childhood she lived near the small town of Ratibořice, where her grandmother Magdalena Novotná played an important part in her life. Němcová would later write her most famous novel with the main character inspired by her grandmother.

When she was 17 years old, she married Josef Němec, fifteen years her senior, who worked as a customs officer and was therefore a state employee. The marriage was arranged by Barbora's parents and became an unhappy one, as the married couple did not understand each other very well. Němec was said to be a rude and authoritarian man. He was a Bohemian patriot, which did not sit well with his superiors, and he was often transferred to different locations and later lost his job. The couple had four children and suffered from a lack of money. Němcová died in poverty, estranged from her husband. She is said to have been in an intimate relationship with the poet Václav Bolemír Nebeský. The Bohemian patriots arranged a magnificent funeral for her.

== Speculations on Božena Němcová's real origin ==
Some authors question the birthdate (the preserved documents differ) and the real origin of Božena Němcová. According to one hypothesis, Němcová could have been born three to four years earlier than previously thought, and been an illegitimate daughter of Wilhelmine, Duchess of Sagan (1781–1839). Helena Sobková, a writer of popular-history books about Němcová, believes that Němcová may actually have been the niece of Wilhelmine. In 1816 an illegitimate daughter was born to Wilhelmine's younger sister, Dorothée de Talleyrand-Périgord, and Count Karl Johann of Clam-Martinic (1792–1840) in Bourbon-l'Archambault (a French spa). The child was not officially recognized by its mother; it was registered as Marie-Henriette Dessalles. The child's further fate is unknown, and it is possible that Duchess Wilhelmine of Sagan later gave the girl to Němcová's parents to raise her as their own child under the name Barbora Panklová.

None of these speculations, however, have been definitely proven by serious historical research.

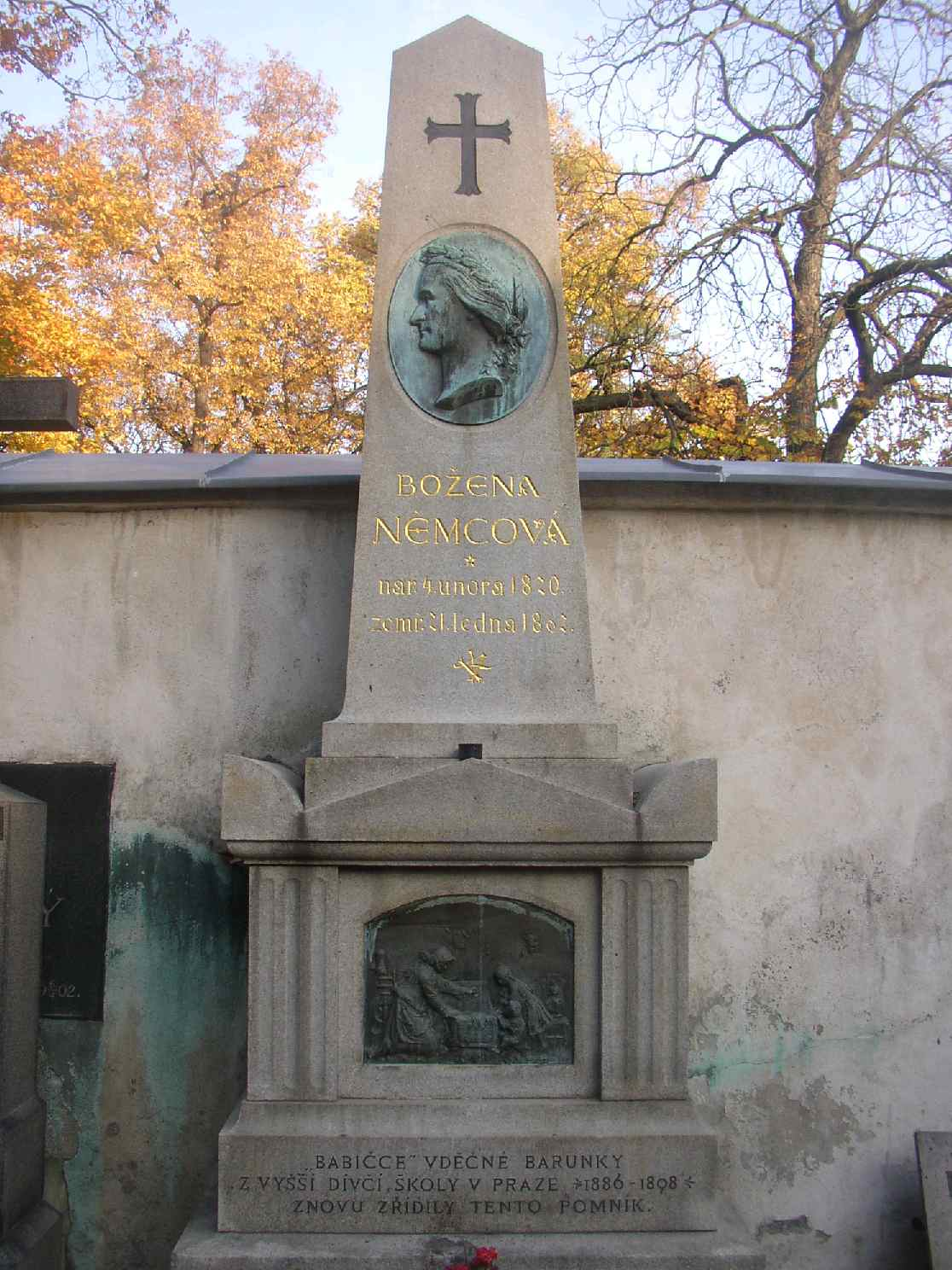
Grave of Božena Němcová in Vyšehrad Cemetery

== Bibliography ==
=== Novels and short stories ===
- Babička (The Grandmother) (1855) – Němcová's best-known novel about a young girl named Barunka (a pet form of Barbora) and her childhood with her grandmother in the countryside. The book was inspired by Němcová's own childhood in the village of Ratibořice, where she lived with her parents, siblings and maternal grandmother Magdalena Novotná.
- Divá Bára (Wild Bára) (1856)
- Pohorská vesnice (The village under mountains) (1855)

=== Fairy tales and legends ===
- Chýše pod horami
- O dvanácti měsíčkách
- Národní báchorky a pověsti (Folk Stories and Legends), a collection
  - Devil and Káča
- Slovenské pohádky a pověsti (Slovak Fairy Tales and Legends)
- Selská politika (Country Politics)
- Hospodyně na slovíčko
- Dopisy z lázní Františkových (The Letters from Franzenbad)
- Listy přítele přítelkyni
- Silný Ctibor
- Devět křížů (Nine Crosses)

== See also ==
- Category:Films based on works by Božena Němcová
- Božena Němcová Theatre
