= Third Cinema =

Political film movement started in the 1960s

Third Cinema (Spanish: Tercer Cine) is a Latin American film movement formed in the 1960s which critiques neocolonialism, the capitalist system, the Hollywood model of cinema as mere entertainment to make money (First Cinema), as well as the individualistic, European film d'auteur (Second Cinema). The term was used by Latin American filmmakers and critics of the 1960s, including the article El Tercer Cine: Cinema Novo - realidad y alternativa, published in April 1968 in the journal Cine al día (Venezuela) by Oswaldo Capriles, and later the manifestos by Argentine filmmakers Fernando Solanas and Octavio Getino, members of the Grupo Cine Liberación ¿Por qué Tercer Cine? (Why Third Cinema?), written and published in June 1969 in the journal Cine al día (Venezuela), and Hacia un tercer cine (Toward a Third Cinema), written and published in October 1969 in the journal Tricontinental by the OSPAAAL (Organization of Solidarity with the People of Asia, Africa and Latin America).

Although conceived by Latin American authors, Third Cinema, as a category, is not limited to Latin America: it was imagined from the outset as a tricontinental paradigm, applicable to anticolonial African cinema (Ousmane Sembène, Djibril Diop Mambéty, Sarah Maldoror, Mostafa Derkaoui, Ahmed Bouanani, Ahmed Rachedi) and Asian cinema (Jocelyne Saab, Heiny Srour, Kidlat Tahimik). Indeed, starting in the 1970s, initiatives emerged such as the Moroccan magazine CINEMA 3, directed by Noureddine Saïl, as well as the Groupe du Troisième cinéma (Jamaat es cinima eth talitha), which arose in Egypt in 1976, directly influenced by the Latin American experience.

Third Cinema shares common ground with other manifestos of the period: Glauber Rocha's "Aesthetic of Hunger" (1965), Julio García Espinosa's "For an Imperfect Cinema" (1969), "Problems of Form and Content in Revolutionary Cinema" (1976) by Jorge Sanjinés.

== Definition ==
In April 1968, in his article El Tercer Cine: Cinema Novo - realidad y alternativa (Third Cinema: Cinema Novo - Reality and Alternative), published in issue 3 of the Venezuelan magazine Cine al día, film critic Oswaldo Capriles used the term Third Cinema to encompass a body of work on the cinema of the countries that make up the so-called Third World. Capriles defines the term as follows:

(...) to speak specifically of Third Cinema is a pressing need of contemporary culture — a need felt with growing urgency in Europe, given its heightened awareness of the shifting centers of global gravity, and one that is simply unavoidable in our own countries, where we can no longer defer the recognition of a shared struggle. In that struggle, the achievement of nationhood, cultural as much as political, is the indispensable step toward eventual universal integration.

In 1969, Solanas and Getino wrote their manisfesto Hacia un tercer cine (Toward a Third Cinema). They considered 'First Cinema' to be the Hollywood production model that idealizes bourgeois values to a passive audience through escapist spectacle and individual characters. 'Second Cinema' is the European art film, which rejects Hollywood conventions but is centred on the individual expression of the auteur director. Third Cinema is meant to be non-commercialized, challenging Hollywood's model. Third Cinema rejects the view of cinema as a vehicle for personal expression, seeing the director instead as part of a collective; it appeals to the masses by presenting the truth and inspiring revolutionary activism. Solanas and Getino strongly argue that traditional exhibition models also should not be used: the films should be screened clandestinely, both in order to dodge censorship and commercial networks, but also so that the viewer must take a risk to see them.

== Background ==
In the late 1940s, the emergence of lighter, less expensive cameras enabled many Latin American filmmakers to begin working outside studio settings: La escalinata (César Enríquez, Venezuela, 1950), Reverón (Margot Benacerraf, Venezuela, 1952), Agulha no Palheiro (Alex Viany, Brazil, 1953), Rua sem Sol (Alex Viany, Brazil, 1954), Rio, 40 Graus (Nelson Pereira dos Santos, Brazil, 1955), O Grande Momento (Roberto Santos, Brazil, 1958), El mégano (Julio García Espinosa and Tomás Gutiérrez Alea, Cuba, 1955), Un vintén p'al Judas (Ugo Ulive, Uruguay, 1959), Araya (Margot Benacerraf, Venezuela, 1959), Caín adolescente (Román Chalbaud, 1959) Tire dié (Fernando Birri, Argentina, 1960), Crónica cubana (Ugo Ulive, Cuba, 1963), and Raíces de piedra (José María Arzuaga, Colombia, 1962), among others. This gradually moved Latin American cinema away from the industrial model.

== Manifestos ==
There are multiple manifestos accredited to beginning the genre of Third Cinema: Glauber Rocha's Aesthetic of Hunger (1965), Julio García Espinosa's For an Imperfect Cinema (1969), Problems of Form and Content in Revolutionary Cinema (1976) by Jorge Sanjinés, and finally Why Third Cinema? (1969) and Toward a Third Cinema (1969) by Fernando Solanas and Octavio Getino. Although all define the broad and far reaching genre, Solanas and Getino's Toward a Third Cinema is well known for its political stance and outline of the genre.

=== "Toward a Third Cinema" ===
Explaining the neo-colonialist dilemma and the need for "a cinema of subversion" or "a revolutionary cinema", "Toward a Third Cinema" begins by explaining the dilemma that the anti-imperialist film-maker is left with a paradoxical need to survive within as well as subvert "the System".

"Third cinema is, in our opinion, the cinema that recognizes in that struggle the most gigantic cultural, scientific, and artistic manifestation of our time, the great possibility of constructing a liberated personality with each people as the starting point – in a word, the decolonization of culture."

Solanas and Getino define the problem with 'the System' (the political and cultural authorities in place) as being one that reduces film to a commodity that exists to fill the needs of the film industry that creates them—mainly in the United States. This "spectator cinema" continues a lack of awareness within the masses of a difference between class interests or "that of the rulers and that of the nation". To the authors, films of 'the System' do not function to change or move the culture forward; they function to maintain it.

==== Availability of technology ====
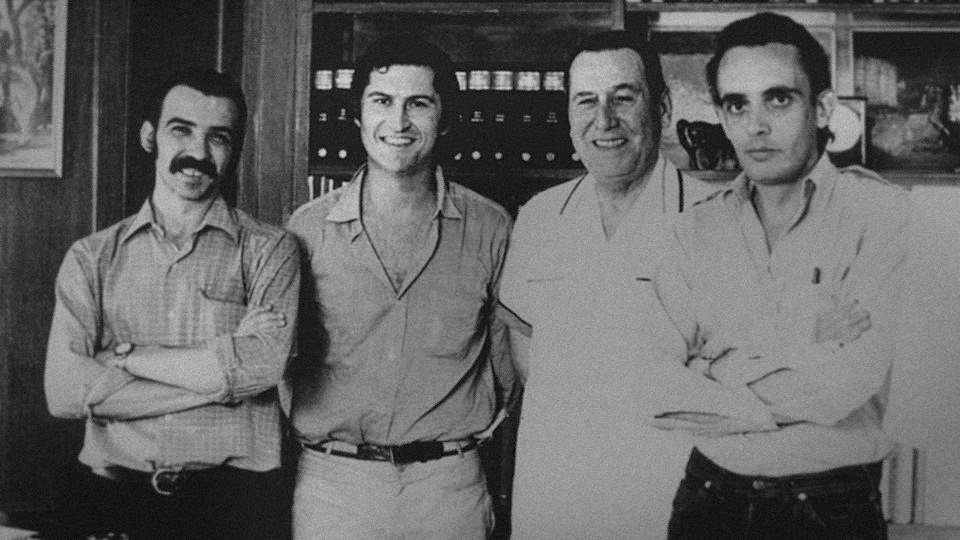
(from left) filmmakers Gerardo Vallejo and Fernando Solanas, former president of Argentina, Juan Domingo Perón, and filmmaker Octavio Getino in 1971.

With the advancement of technology in film in the late 1960s (simplification of cameras and tape recorders, rapid film that can be shot in normal light, automatic light meters, improved audio/visual synchronization), Solanas and Getino argue that an alternative cinema is finally possible. The authors cite the Imperfect Cinema movement in Cuba, Cinegiornali liberi in Italy, Zengakuren documentaries in Japan as proof that it is already happening.

Urging the need to further politicize and experiment with the format of film—mainly the documentary—Solanas and Getino illustrate the somewhat obscure and non-universal steps that must be taken to make "revolutionary cinema":

"Real alternatives differing from those offered by the System are only possible if one of two requirements is fulfilled: making films that the System cannot assimilate and which are foreign to its needs, or making films that directly and explicitly set out to fight the System."

==== The "guerilla-film-unit" ====
Paradoxically, Solanas and Getino continue to state that it is not enough to simply rebel against 'the System'. The manifesto uses Jean-Luc Godard and the French New Wave throughout as a formidable example of a group which failed to properly subvert 'the System'. Referring to it as “second cinema” or "author's cinema", the problem begins with the genre's attempt to exist parallel, be distributed by, and funded by 'the System'. Solanas and Getino quote Godard's self-description as being 'trapped inside the fortress' and refer to the metaphor throughout the manifesto.

Because of this paradox of subversion but need for distinctions between commodified rebellion and "the cinema of revolution", Solanas and Getino recognize that film-makers must function like a guerilla unit, one that "cannot grow strong without military structures and command concepts." The authors also recognize that the difficulties encountered by those attempting to make revolutionary cinema will stem mainly from its need to work as a synchronized unit. Claiming that the only solution to these difficulties is common awareness of the basics of interpersonal relationships, Solanas and Getino go further to state that "The myth of the irreplaceable technicians must be exploded."

The guerilla-film unit requires that all members have general knowledge of the equipment being used and caution that any failure in a production will be ten-fold that of a first cinema production. This condition—based on the fact that monetary support will be slim and come mainly from the group itself—also requires that members of the guerilla-film unit be wary and maintain an amount of silence not custom to conventional film-making.

"The success of the work depends [on]…permanent wariness, a condition that is difficult to achieve in a situation in which apparently nothing is happening and the film-maker has been accustomed to telling all…because the bourgeoisie has trained him precisely on such a basis of prestige and promotion."

==== Distribution and showing ====
The manifesto concludes with an explanation for how to best distribute third cinema films. Using their own experience with La Hora de los Hornos (The Hour of the Furnaces), Solanas and Getino share that the most intellectually profitable showings were followed by group discussions. The following elements (Solanas and Getino even refer to them as mise en scène) that "reinforce the themes of the films, the climate of the showing, the 'disinhibiting' of the participants, and the dialogue":

- Art pieces such as recorded music, poetry, sculpture, paintings, and posters
- A program director to chair the debate and present the film
- Refreshments such as wine or yerba mate

When distributed correctly, third cinema films will result in the audience members becoming what Solanas and Getino refer to as "man-actor-accomplices" as they become crucial to the film achieving its goal to transform society. It is only when the "man-actor-accomplice" responds to the film that third cinema becomes effective.

"Freeing a forbidden truth means setting free the possibility of indignation and subversion. Our truth, that of the new man who builds himself by getting rid of all the defects that still weigh him down, is a bomb of inexhaustible power and, at the same time, the only real possibility of life."

== History ==
Third Cinema manifestos and theories evolved in the 1960s and 1970s as a response to the social, political, and economic realities in Latin American countries which were experiencing oppression from Neo-colonial policies. In their manifesto, Solana and Getino describe Third Cinema as a cinematic movement and a dramatic alternative to First Cinema, which was produced in Hollywood, for the purpose of entertaining its audiences; and from Second Cinema that increased the author's liberty of expression. Fundamentally different, Third Cinema films sought to inspire revolution against class, racial and gender inequalities. Spectators were called upon to reflect on social injustices and the process by which their realities occurred, and to take action to transform their conditions. Even though Third Cinema films arose during revolutionary eras in Latin America and other countries, this filmmaking is still influential today. This style of filmmaking includes a radical form of production, distribution and exhibition that seeks to expose the living conditions of people at the grassroots level.

Purpose and goals of Third Cinema Third Cinema seeks to expose the process by which oppression occurs; and to criticize those responsible for social inequality in a country or community. Some of the goals of Third Cinema are:

- Raise political consciousness in the viewer/spectator
- Expose historical, social, political and/or economic policies that have led to exploitive conditions for the nation
- Engage spectators in reflection which will inspire them to take revolutionary action and improve their conditions
- Create films that express the experiences of the masses of a particular region
- Produce and distribute films that are uncensored by oppressive entities

== Production ==
Due to their political nature, Third Cinema films were often censored and therefore, the production and distribution of these films were innovative. Films used documentary clips, news reels, photographs, video clips, interviews and/or statistics and in some cases, non-professional actors. These production elements are combined in an inventive manner to create a message that is specific to its local audience. The staff in production share all aspects of the production process by working collectively. In Third Cinema, for example, a Director can be the Cameraman, the Photographer or the Writer at different phases of the production. Since Third Cinema films were highly politicized, they often lacked the funding and support needed for production or distribution and instead sought funding outside government agencies or traditional financing opportunities available to commercial films. Other unique aspects of Third Cinema film production is the use of their local natural landscape for film shootings often in parts of the country not previously seen. This unique feature was augmented by highlighting the local history and culture of its nation.

== Women in Third Cinema ==
Margot Benacerraf was an important antecedent to Third Cinema. Her documentary Araya (1959), which portrays the daily labor of salt workers on Venezuela's Araya peninsula, won the International Critics' Prize (FIPRESCI) at the Cannes Film Festival in 1959, a decade before Fernando Solanas and Octavio Getino's manifesto Hacia un tercer cine formalized the movement's terms in 1969. Although Araya predates Third Cinema's explicit political framework, its sustained attention to manual labor and to a peripheral economic zone of Latin America anticipated concerns that the movement would later theorize. According to critic Moira Fradinger, the desert and drought imagery in Araya (including a shot of a dead goat on the salt-flat coast under the sun) inspired visual devices that Glauber Rocha would later use in the opening shots of Black God, White Devil (1964), centered on a dead horse surrounded by flies in the northeastern Brazilian Sertão. Fradinger extends this genealogy to Barren Lives (Nelson Pereira dos Santos, 1963), in which drought kills off the animals encountered by the protagonist Fabiano during his nomadic journey through the northeast.

Third Cinema's critique and resistance of Hollywood's imperialist "spectator cinema" also opened for differing representations of women in film. While feminist film movements in the United States in the 1970s critiqued the eurocentric and heteronormative sexism within the First-World, the intersection of heterosexism with racism and imperialism seemed to get little attention from mainstream film journals. Because of the reluctance of First-World feminists to acknowledge the importance of nationalism and geographic identity within differing struggles of women, the films made by the women of Third Cinema were usually seen as "burdened" from the Western feminist perspective by these identities.

"Notions of nation and race, along with community-based work, are implicitly dismissed as both too 'specific' to qualify for the theoretical realm of 'feminist theory' and as too 'inclusive' in their concern for nation and race that they presumably 'lose sight' of feminism."

Along with the advancement and availability of technology, and the revolutionary tactics proposed by Third Cinema, third-worldist feminist film-makers began to tell their own stories. Because the genre proposed a non-homogeneous approach to cinema (one which allowed variation from region to region and intersection between fiction and documentary), differing stories of "womanhood" and women's position within revolutions could be told. Lebanese film director Heiny Srour commented in one interview:

"Those of us from the Third World have to reject the ideas of film narration based on the 19th century bourgeois novel with its commitment to harmony. Our societies have been too lacerated and fractured by colonial powers to fit into those neat scenarios."

Notable films include Sarah Maldoror's Sambizanga (Mozambique, 1972) which takes place in Angola where a woman awakens to "revolutionary consciousness" to the struggle of the ruling party the MPLA. In Heiny Srour's documentary Saat al Tahrir (The Hour of Liberation Has Arrived) (Oman, 1973) followed women fighters during the revolution in Oman. Srour's 1984 film Leila wal dhiab (Leila and the Wolves) (Lebanon) followed the role of women in the Palestine Liberation Movement. Helena Solberg Ladd's From the Ashes: Nicaragua Today (U.S. 1982) documents the role of women in the Sandinista revolution. Sara Gómez's De cierta manera (One Way or Another) epitomizes Third Cinema's involvement in the intersection of fiction and documentary as it gives a feminist critique of the Cuban revolution.

== Filmmakers ==
This is an incomplete list and still does not reflect the number of film-makers that have contributed to Third Cinema.

Country	Name	Affiliated with
Argentina	Fernando Solanas	Grupo Cine Liberación
Argentina	Octavio Getino	Grupo Cine Liberación
Argentina	Raymundo Gleyzer	Cine de la Base
Bangladesh	Tareque Masud	
Bangladesh	Tanvir Mokammel	
Bangladesh	Kamar Ahmad Simon	
Bangladesh	Mostofa Sarwar	
Brazil	Glauber Rocha	Cinema Nôvo
Brazil	Nelson Pereira Dos Santos	Cinema Nôvo
Brazil	Rogerio Sganzerla	Cinema Marginal
Brazil	Helena Solberg	
Bolivia	Jorge Sanjinés	
Colombia	Luis Ospina	
Colombia	Marta Rodríguez	
Colombia	Carlos Mayolo	
Cuba	Julio García Espinosa	Cuban revolutionary cinema
Cuba	Tomás Gutiérrez Alea	
Cuba	Sara Gomez	
India	Satyajit Ray	Parallel Cinema
India	Ritwik Ghatak	Parallel Cinema
India	Mrinal Sen	Parallel Cinema
India	Gautam Ghosh	Parallel Cinema
India	Shyam Benegal	Parallel Cinema
India	John Abraham	Parallel Cinema
India	G Aravindan	Parallel Cinema
India	Adoor Gopalakrishnan	Parallel Cinema
Lebanon	Heiny Srour	
Lebanon	Jocelyne Saab	
Mauritania	Med Hondo	
Mexico	Paul Leduc	
Mozambique	Sarah Maldoror	
Mozambique	Isabel Noronha	
Mozambique	Camilo de Sousa	
Nicaragua	Helena Solberg Ladd	
Pakistan	Jamil Dehlavi	
Philippines	Kidlat Tahimik	
Senegal	Djibril Diop Mambéty	
Senegal	Ousmane Sembène	
Venezuela	Carlos Rebolledo	Nuevo Cine Venezolano
Venezuela	Jesús Enrique Guédez	Nuevo Cine Venezolano
Venezuela	Ugo Ulive	Nuevo Cine Venezolano
Venezuela	Donald Myerston	Nuevo Cine Venezolano

== Aesthetic and filmmaking style ==
The aesthetic of Third Cinema is influenced by its low budget and amateur film makers, leading to a style of film not reliant on special effects and action set pieces, but rather on real life events and subtle stories. This deviation from the traditional Western film structure can be seen today reflected in both documentary and feature films. In the age of digital filmmaking, it has become easier than ever to produce a film without technical training or access to expensive equipment. Some notable examples of this are guerilla documentaries. Robert Greenwald's films released through grass-roots organizations, Uncovered: The Whole Truth About the Iraq War and Outfoxed: Rupert Murdoch's War on Journalism, were shot in historical Hollywood places where movies like Gone with the Wind were originally filmed. Outfoxed was one of his secretive films about the distortion of information by Fox News (Boynton, 2004).

Sean Baker, an American filmmaker who shot an entire movie on an iPhone 5S, created the most talked-about iPhone film called Tangerine. Following two Los Angeles prostitutes around the glowing city, viewers are reminded how he tends to cast unlikely protagonists. Other artists in the industry are creating films with iPads, digital cameras, and creating motion with bicycles, all hinging on the low-budget, surprise-delivering spirit of the Third Cinema (Murphey, 2015).

Third Cinema continues to inspire and challenge modern and current artists and filmmakers. The ripples of this movement can still be seen in both overall aesthetic and in its ability to challenge political ideals and standards as well as what is "typical" in the movie industry. This influence of modern works has been appreciated all over the world. Experts agree that Solanas and Getino urged for "Third Cinema can and should emerge from everywhere" (Saljoughi, 2016). The purposeful activism sparked by Third Cinema was not defined to play catch-up to wealthier filmmakers, but to spark innovative creation in third world populations. Marked by risk-taking and storytelling, the genre is not secretive in its aims (Sarkar, n.d.).

== Political agenda ==
Third Cinema attempted to unite Third World populations experiencing oppression, focusing on Central America, Africa and Asia (Ivo, 2018). The motivation of these films was to inspire these populations to revolution against the controlling regimes. Third Cinema established a departure from both the norms of commercial Hollywood films, as well as the Second Cinema movement of European art films. Rather than create dramatic storylines, these artists strove to show the drama of everyday life while promoting critical thinking (Gonon, n.d.). This rejection of traditional film democratized the industry and opened the possibility for smaller scale stories to be told (Wayne, 2019). Solanas and Getino actually wrote the main part of their manifesto in dictator-controlled Argentina. When Solanas was exiled in Paris, he gave the Third Cinema a more broadened definition, adding the importance of the "conception of the world" (Stollery, 2002). While many a filmmaker have deemed the movement antiquated and not of progressive value, experts re-envision the Third Cinema as an object of analysis (Dixon & Zonn, 2005).

More recently, the military repression of Cuba in the 1970's slowed this creative filmmaking on the island. The Edinburgh Film Festival held a conference on Third Cinema in 1986, marking a resurgence of the genre. The result of this conference was the publication of Questions of Third Cinema by many authors, which failed to include contributors from Latin America and even Solanas and Getino themselves. Third Cinema is then discussed as encompassing most Latin American films and all films that have political charge and meaning.

== Third Cinema films ==
- Vidas Secas, Nelson Perreira Dos Santos (Brazil, 1963)
- La Hora de Los Hornos, Fernando Solanas and Octavio Getina (Argentina, 1968)
- Memorias del Subdesarrollo, Thomas Guiterrez Alea, (Cuba, 1968)
- Antonio das Mortes, Glauber Rocha (Brazil, 1969)
- Blood of the Condor, Jorge Sanjines (Bolivia, 1969)
- Mandabi, Ousmane Sembene (Senegal, 1969)
- México, la revolución congelada, Raymond Glevzer (Argentina, 1971)
- The Principal Enemy, Jorge Sanjines (Peru, 1974)
- Towers of Silence, Jamil Dehlavi (Pakistan, 1975)
- The Vampires of Poverty, Luis Ospina and Carlos Mayolo (Colombia, 1978)

== See also ==
- Political cinema
- Dictator novel, a Latin American contemporary literary genre
- Films depicting Latin American military dictatorships
