= List of Portuguese films of the 1950s =

A list of films produced in the Cinema of Portugal ordered by year of release in the 1950s. For an alphabetical list of Portuguese films see Category:Portuguese films

== 1950s ==
Title	Director	Cast	Genre	Notes
1950
1951
1952
Os Três da Vida Airada	Perdigão Queiroga		Comedy	
Eram Duzentos Irmãos	Armando Vieira Pinto			
1953
Chaimite	Jorge Brum do Canto			
1954
1955
1956
1957
1958
Sangue Toureiro	Augusto Fraga			
1959
A Costureirinha da Sé	Manuel Guimarães			
Portuguese Rhapsody	João Mendes			Entered into the 1959 Cannes Film Festival
