= Escuela Internacional de Cine y Televisión =

Film school in Cuba

- Motto: Aprender haciendo (Learning by doing)
- Type: Private / NGO Film School
- Established: December 15, 1986
- Founders: Gabriel García Márquez, Fernando Birri, Julio García Espinosa
- Affiliations: Fundación del Nuevo Cine Latinoamericano, CILECT
- Director: Susana Molina
- Location: San Antonio de los Baños, Artemisa, Cuba
- Language: Spanish
- Website: www.eictv.org

The Escuela Internacional de Cine y Televisión (EICTV) is an internationally recognized film and television school located in San Antonio de los Baños, Artemisa Province, Cuba. The institution was founded on December 15, 1986, by the Colombian journalist and Nobel laureate Gabriel García Márquez, Argentine filmmaker Fernando Birri, and Cuban theoretician and filmmaker Julio García Espinosa. It was established under the auspices of the Fundación del Nuevo Cine Latinoamericano (Foundation of New Latin American Cinema) and received logistical support and land from the Cuban government under Fidel Castro.

Often referred to as the "School of Three Worlds" (Escuela de Todos los Mundos), the EICTV originally aimed to provide rigorous cinematic training to students from Latin America, Africa, and Asia. Today, it has opened its doors to aspiring filmmakers globally, maintaining its status as a vital hub for independent cinema, critical thinking, and international co-production.

== History ==
=== Foundation and Early Years ===
The establishment of the EICTV was a manifestation of the Third Cinema movement and the broader goals of the Fundación del Nuevo Cine Latinoamericano. The founders envisioned an audiovisual training center for creatives from developing nations, free from the commercial pressures of Hollywood. García Márquez, who was deeply passionate about cinema and had previously worked as a screenwriter, utilized his international prestige to secure funding and resources. Fernando Birri, often considered the father of the New Latin American Cinema, served as the school's inaugural director, instilling a manifesto of "socially conscious but artistically free" filmmaking.

=== The Special Period and Resilience ===
Following the collapse of the Soviet Union in 1991, Cuba entered a severe economic crisis known as the Special Period. The EICTV faced significant shortages in film stock, equipment, electricity, and basic necessities. Despite these immense challenges, the school remained operational, largely sustained by international donations, tuition fees from European students, and the relentless advocacy of García Márquez. The resourcefulness demanded during this era became deeply embedded in the school's teaching philosophy, teaching students to create impactful cinema with minimal resources.

== Campus and facilities ==
Situated approximately 40 kilometers from Havana, the EICTV is located on a former agricultural estate in San Antonio de los Baños. The isolated, rural setting is a deliberate choice, creating an immersive, "monastic" environment where students and faculty live together and focus entirely on filmmaking.

The campus operates as a boarding school and is equipped with soundstages, editing suites, a mixing theater, and specialized camera equipment. Its library, the Mediateca André Bazin, is one of the most comprehensive audiovisual archives in Latin America, containing thousands of films, screenplays, and theoretical texts.

== Academic programs ==
=== Regular Course (Curso Regular) ===
The cornerstone of the EICTV's educational model is its three-year Regular Course (Curso Regular). The program is highly selective, admitting a small cohort of students each year based on rigorous portfolio reviews and exams.

- Year 1: Students undergo a multidisciplinary polyvalent training program, learning the basics of all cinematic trades.
- Years 2 and 3: Students declare a specialization and engage in advanced theoretical and practical training. The specializations include Documentary Direction, Fiction Direction, Sound, TV and New Media, Screenwriting, Cinematography, Editing, and Production.

=== International Workshops and Master's Degrees ===
In addition to the Regular Course, the school offers short-term International Workshops (Talleres Internacionales) and advanced Master's programs. These courses attract working professionals looking to hone specific skills, such as underwater cinematography, advanced color grading, or documentary pitching.

== Educational philosophy ==
The EICTV operates under a distinctive "learning by doing" (aprender haciendo) philosophy. The curriculum dictates that practical execution is as important as theoretical study. Students are required to conceptualize, shoot, and edit a multitude of short films, documentaries, and thesis projects on strict deadlines.

Crucially, the school employs very few permanent academic faculty. Instead, it relies on a rotating roster of active industry professionals from around the globe who travel to Cuba to teach intensive modules ranging from one to four weeks. This ensures the curriculum remains grounded in contemporary, real-world cinematic practices rather than purely academic theory.

== Visiting faculty and guest lecturers ==
Because of its unique pedigree and the influence of Gabriel García Márquez, the EICTV has historically attracted revered figures in world cinema to hold workshops, give masterclasses, or simply interact with students.

Notable visiting faculty and guests have included:

- Francis Ford Coppola, who frequently visited in the school's early years, occasionally cooking pasta for the entire student body while teaching screenwriting and directing.
- Werner Herzog, who has conducted his renowned "Rogue Film School" seminars at the EICTV, teaching students about perseverance and ecstatic truth in documentary filmmaking.
- Abbas Kiarostami, the legendary Iranian auteur who hosted an intensive practical workshop in San Antonio de los Baños, guiding students in making shorts over a ten-day period.
- Other notable visitors have included Steven Spielberg, George Lucas, Brian De Palma, Emir Kusturica, and Agnès Varda.

== Global impact and partnerships ==
Over the decades, the EICTV has grown into a crucial institution for international cooperation and cinematic diversity. It is a full member of CILECT (The International Association of Film and Television Schools). Thousands of professionals from over 50 countries have graduated, creating a vast global alumni network known informally as "la mafia de San Antonio."

The school maintains partnerships with numerous international institutions, allowing for student exchanges and co-productions. For instance, Concordia University's Mel Hoppenheim School of Cinema in Canada and several European film academies hold formal collaborative agreements with the EICTV.

== Notable alumni ==
The EICTV has produced a significant number of award-winning directors, producers, writers, and cinematographers who have premiered works at major festivals like Cannes, Venice, and Berlin.

- Amat Escalante (Mexico) – Director and screenwriter, known for critically acclaimed films such as Heli (Best Director at the Cannes Film Festival) and The Untamed.
- Benito Zambrano (Spain) – Film director and screenwriter, highly celebrated for his multi-Goya-winning debut feature Solas.
- Mariana Rondón (Venezuela) – Film director and visual artist, best known for her coming-of-age drama Bad Hair (Pelo Malo), which won the Golden Shell at the San Sebastián International Film Festival.
- Jaime Rosales (Spain) – Film director whose film La Soledad won the Goya Award for Best Director and Best Film.
- Estibaliz Urresola Solaguren (Spain) – Basque filmmaker, director of the acclaimed feature 20,000 Species of Bees which premiered at the Berlinale.
- Kiro Russo (Bolivia) – Director and cinematographer known for Dark Skull (Viejo Calavera) and The Great Movement, which won the Special Jury Prize in the Orizzonti section at the Venice Film Festival.
- Anne von Petersdorff (Germany) – Scholar, writer, and filmmaker known for her documentary work and collaborative, border-crossing projects, including the acclaimed film Wanderlust, female bodies in transit.
- Miguel Coyula (Cuba) – Independent filmmaker and writer, noted for his rebellious, non-linear cinematic style in films like Memories of Overdevelopment and Blue Heart.
- Bettina Blümner (Germany) – Director and academic, renowned for her acclaimed documentary film Prinzessinnenbad (Pool of Princesses).
- Juan Carlos Valdivia (Bolivia) – Director of Zona Sur, which won Best Direction and Best Screenplay in the World Cinema Dramatic Competition at Sundance.
- Jorge Molina (Cuba) – Actor and cult independent filmmaker.
