= Araya, Venezuela =

Araya
- Town
- Location within Venezuela
- Country: Venezuela
- State: Sucre
- Time zone: UTC-4:30 (VST)
  - Summer (DST): UTC-4:30 (not observed)

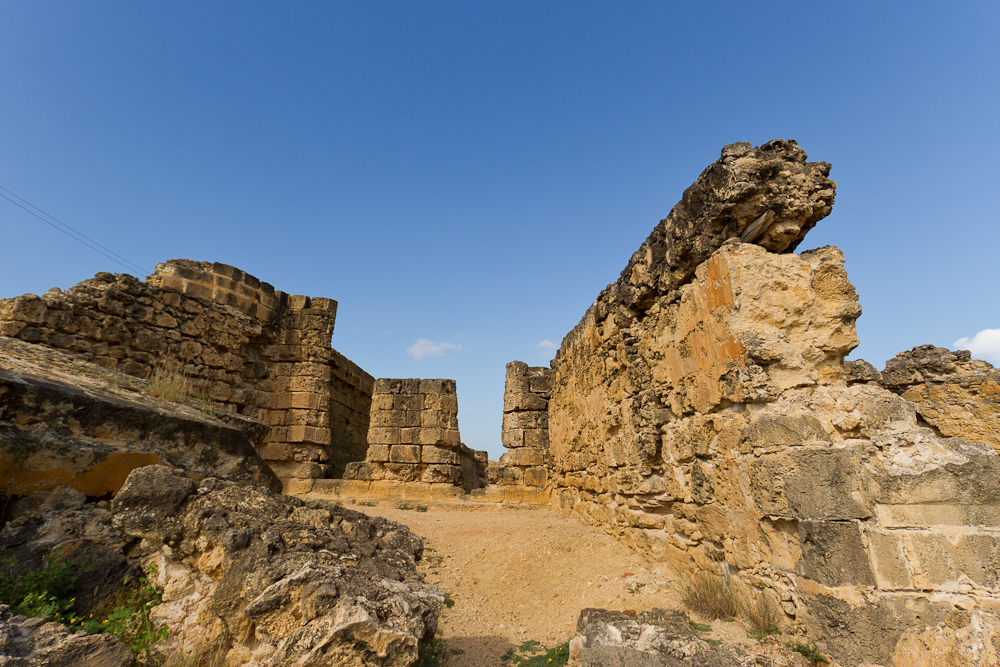
Castillo de Araya

Araya is a town located on Venezuela's Caribbean coast, on the westernmost extremity of the Araya Peninsula.

Araya is arid and dry, and is known for its salt flats. It has significant tourism potential thanks to its beautiful beaches and the historic Spanish fortress located along the coast.

== History ==
Two prominent naturalists who conducted scientific explorations of Venezuelan territory during the colonial period reached the vicinity of the town of Araya and its castle. The first was the Swedish naturalist Pehr Löfling, who pioneered systematic descriptions of Venezuelan flora and fauna and introduced the use of the microscope in the country. On April 8, 1754, from the ship that brought him to Venezuela, anchored off the Castle of Araya, Löfling studied the marine bioluminescence characteristic of the waters in the area.

The second of these distinguished scientists was Baron Alexander von Humboldt, who during his journey through the region on August 19, 1799 visited the ruins of the Castle of Araya. During his expedition he conducted astronomical, geographical, geological, zoological, and botanical studies. Like Löfling before him, Humboldt also investigated the phenomenon of bioluminescence in the waters of the region.

== Araya Fortress ==
The Araya Fortress is a beige-brown stone masonry fortification. The fortification was built in order to defend Araya and the Araya Peninsula against Caribbean pirates.

The Spanish Empire focused on the pearls that could be found off the coast at Cubagua and Margarita islands. Because this area had the largest salt plains in the country, the Dutch and the English started extracting the salt, an important product at that time.

When the pearl harvesting came to an end, the Spanish used the fort to defend the salt plains against the English and the Dutch. The fort was abandoned after a hurricane destroyed the area and the salt reserves were lost. On October 31, 1960, the ruins of the castle were declared a National Historic Monument, with restricted access for tourists.

1959 the film Araya by Margot Benacerraf portrayed the area, it entered into the 1959 Cannes Film Festival.

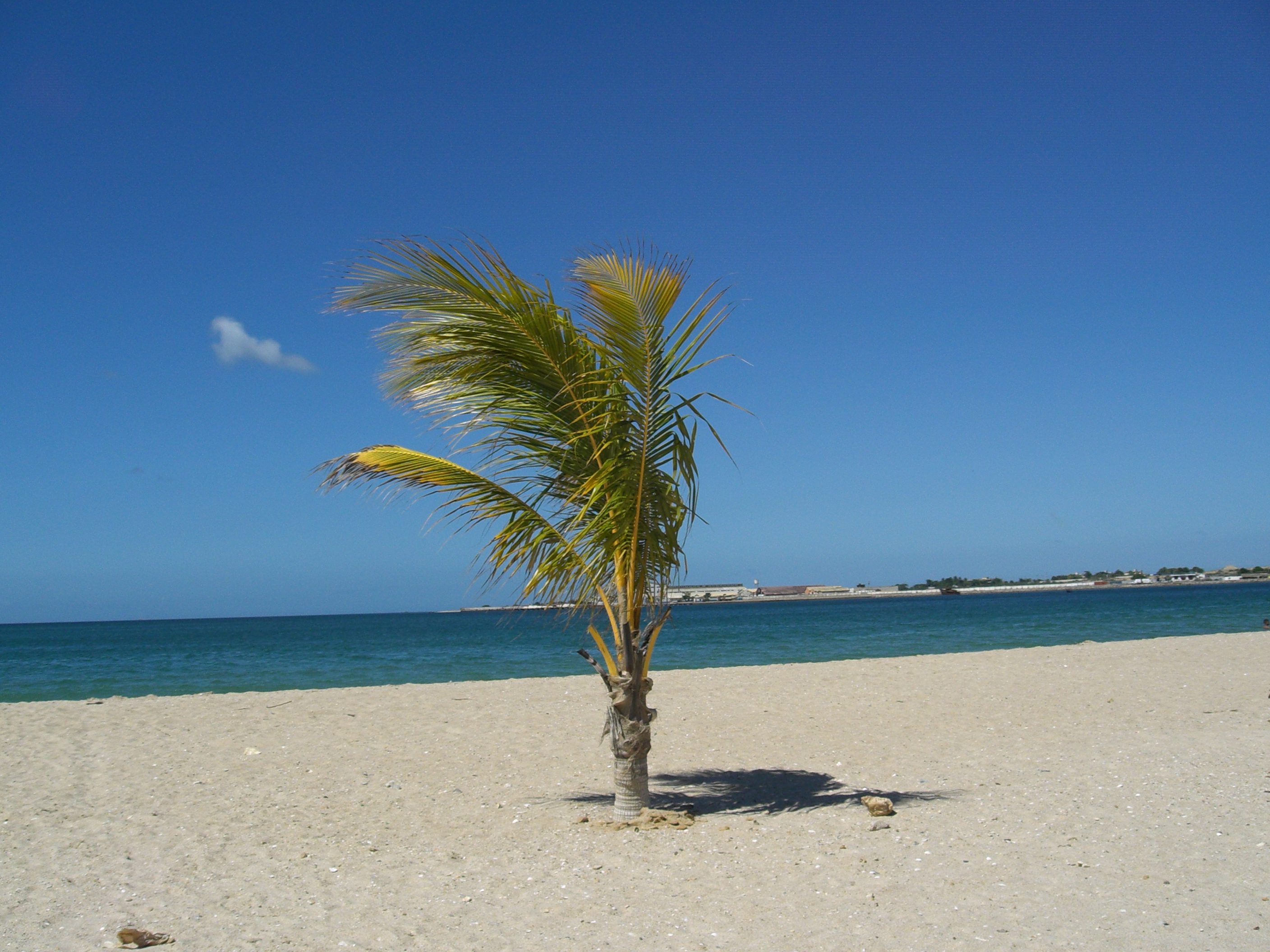
El Castillo beach
