= Samuel Feijóo =

- Born: March 31, 1914; Las Villas, Cuba
- Died: July 14, 1992 (aged 78); La Habana, Cuba
- Occupation(s): Artist and writer

Samuel Feijóo Rodríguez (March 31, 1914 in San Juan de los Yeras, Las Villas, Cuba – July 14, 1992 in La Habana, Cuba) was a Cuban writer and artist specializing in painting and illustration.

== Career ==
Feijóo was a self-taught multifaceted artist and writer. He was a promoter of the popular artists movement in Las Villas, Cuba in 1960 and after he was vice-president of the Unión de Escritores y Artistas de Cuba (UNEAC) in the same province. Feijóo was the director of publications and editor at the Universidad Central de Las Villas and was founder and director at Signos magazine in 1969.

In the 1940s he published some collections of poems such as Comrade celeste (1944), Aventuras con los aguinaldos (1947) and Beth-el (1949), among others. His narrative work is marked by the rural environment, traditions, peasant folklore and Afro-Cuban mythology. His novel Juan Quinquín in Pueblo Mocho (1964) stands out significantly, as well as the volume of stories Storytelling, which earned him the Luis Felipe Rodríguez Short Story Award, from the Union of Writers and Artists of Cuba (UNEAC) in 1975. Feijóo also developed an appreciable essay work in which, in addition to his studies of poetic forms, his works on popular culture stand out, such as The Black in Cuban Folk Literature (1980), Cuban Mythology (1980) and American Mythology (1983).

Samuel Feijóo has not only discovered and promoted the best of the populace's artistic creation, but he has also drawn on it to make his own work. Feijóo is not the type of "popular artist" who executes his works spontaneously, isolated, almost at random, but the type who knows how to observe, penetrate and capture popular essences and after their abstraction capture them through cultured ways.

== Exhibitions ==
Feijóo exhibited part of his graphic production in 1961 in a show called Samuel Feijóo: Dibujos, Acuarelas y Aguafuertes at Biblioteca Nacional José Martí in Havana; in 1974 he had an exhibition called Feijóo/Cuba at the Silkeborg Kunst Museum in Silkeborg, Denmark; and in 1978 Samuel Feijóo. Kokoriokos Kakafuakos was shown at Casa de la Cultura de Plaza in Havana.

Feijóo presented his paintings in 1977 at the 50 Años de la Revista de Avance at the Museo Nacional de Bellas Artes in Havana; in 1984 at the I Bienal de La Habana, Museo Nacional de Bellas Artes in Havana; in 1986 in the show Künstler aus Kuba at Galerie Junge Künstler, Berlin, Germany and in 1991 his exhibit titled Maestros de la Pintura Cubana was shown at Centro Provincial de Artes Plásticas y Diseño in Havana.

His work can be found in the permanent collection of the Museo Nacional de Bellas Artes in Havana.

== Awards ==
- National Culture Medal, Cuba, 1981.
- Alejo Carpentier Medal, Cuba, 1982.
- Félix Elmuza Medal, Cuba, 1984.
- Raúl Gómez García medal, Cuba, 1989.
- XXX Aniversario del levantamiento del 5 de septiembre Medal, Cuba, 1989.
- Order Félix Varela, Consejo de Estado de la República de Cuba, 1990.
- 60th Anniversary of Liberation Medal, Mongolia, 1978.
- Medal of Cultural Merit, Poland, 1981.
- 1300 Years of Bulgaria Medal, 1985.

== Film ==
In 1967, a film written and directed by Julio García Espinosa was released, entitled Aventuras de Juan Quin Quin. It was based on Feijóo's 1963 novel Juan Quin Quin en pueblo Mocho.
