= Jesús Enrique Guédez =

- Born: Jesús Enrique Guédez Acevedo; September 8, 1930; Puerto de Nutrias, Barinas State, Venezuela
- Died: June 29, 2007 (aged 76); Caracas, Venezuela
- Occupations: Filmmaker, poet, journalist
- Employer: Central University of Venezuela
- Movement: Third Cinema, New Venezuelan Cinema
- Spouse: Dolores Pérez
- Children: Miguel, Milena, Betina, Rafael Guédez

Jesús Enrique Guédez Acevedo (8 September 1930 – 29 June 2007) was a Venezuelan filmmaker, poet, and journalist regarded as one of the founders of the political documentary tradition in Venezuelan cinema. He served as the first president of the National Association of Film Authors (Asociación Nacional de Autores Cinematográficos, ANAC). His documentary work, produced mainly through the University Studies Program of the Central University of Venezuela, is closely associated with the emergence of Third Cinema and New Venezuelan Cinema.

== Career ==
Guédez studied journalism at the Central University of Venezuela (UCV), where he became involved from a young age with socialist and revolutionary currents that shaped his later political and ethical outlook. During this period he worked for the newspaper La Calle as a proofreader and typesetter, and spent roughly a decade as a reporter for Tribuna Popular; he also worked for a time in the oil fields of Barinas. In 1960 he was a founding member of the literary group Tabla Redonda.

His literary career began in parallel with his political formation: his first poetry collection, Las naves (1959), received the Premio de Poesía de las Universidades Nacionales. A trip to Italy in 1963, undertaken out of an interest in Italian poetry, led him to sit the admission examination of the Centro Sperimentale di Cinematografia in Rome, where he was accepted after submitting an essay on poetry and cinema; he studied film direction there for about a year.

Guédez began directing documentaries in the mid-1960s, the same period in which he published his poetry collection Sextantes (1965). Alongside Román Chalbaud and Margot Benacerraf, he is counted among the isolated early efforts that anticipated the New Venezuelan Cinema movement, with his short documentary La ciudad que nos ve, made in collaboration with Josefina Jordán, financed through the UCV's University Studies Program. The film drew on surveys of living conditions in Caracas's hillside barrios to document the country's stark social inequality amid the oil-driven prosperity of the period, and is frequently cited alongside Carlos Rebolledo's Pozo muerto (1967) as one of the earliest works of committed, denunciatory documentary in Venezuela.

He returned to the subject of Caracas's poor neighborhoods in two further films, Los niños callan (1969) and Pueblo de lata (1973), which together with La ciudad que nos ve are often read as a trilogy on urban marginality; Pueblo de lata received a FIPRESCI mention at the 1973 Oberhausen Film Festival. His other documentaries include Donde no llega el médico (1965), La gastroenteritis en Venezuela (1965), Bárbaro Rivas (1967), La universidad vota en contra (1968, co-directed with Nelson Arrieti), Campoma (1975), Panamá (1976), Testimonio de un obrero petrolero (1978), and El iluminado (1978); he also directed a small number of fiction works, among them Juego al general (1971) and El circo mágico (1975).

From 1968 Guédez taught at the Cátedra de Cine of the UCV's School of Social Communication, first as an invited professor and, from 1974, as a regular faculty member. He was also active as a labor organizer, holding a leadership role in the professional union of radio, theater, film, and television workers. In 1994 he received the Premio Nacional de Cine.

Guédez continued to publish poetry throughout his life, including Sacramentales (1961), Tiempo de los paisajes (1978), El gran poder (1991), Cantares de O Gran Sol (1994), Viajes del sol y la luna (2000), and Poemas crudos (2004), as well as the short-story collection Puerteños (1995). He left two collections of prose pieces, Calumnias del espejo, gathering chronicles on art, communication, and culture, and Al paso del niño, a more intimate volume of family recollections.

== Personal life and death ==
Guédez was married to Dolores Pérez; the couple had four children, Miguel, Milena, Betina, and Rafael Guédez.

He died in Caracas on 29 June 2007.

== Filmography ==
=== Documentaries ===
- Donde no llega el médico (1965)
- La gastroenteritis en Venezuela (1965)
- La ciudad que nos ve (1965 or 1966, co-directed with Josefina Jordán)
- Bárbaro Rivas (1967)
- La universidad vota en contra (1968, co-directed with Nelson Arrieti)
- Los niños callan (1969)
- Pueblo de lata (1973)
- Campoma (1975)
- Panamá (1976)
- Testimonio de un obrero petrolero (1978)
- El iluminado (1978)

=== Fiction ===
- Juego al general (1971)
- El circo mágico (1975)

== Bibliography ==
=== Poetry ===
- Sacramentales (1961)
- Tiempo de los paisajes (1978)
- El gran poder (1991)
- Cantares de O Gran Sol (1994)
- Viajes del sol y la luna (2000)
- Poemas crudos (2004)

=== Short stories ===
- Puerteños (1995)
