= Araya Peninsula =

Peninsula on the Caribbean Sea

Coordinates: 10.6039°N 63.9768°W

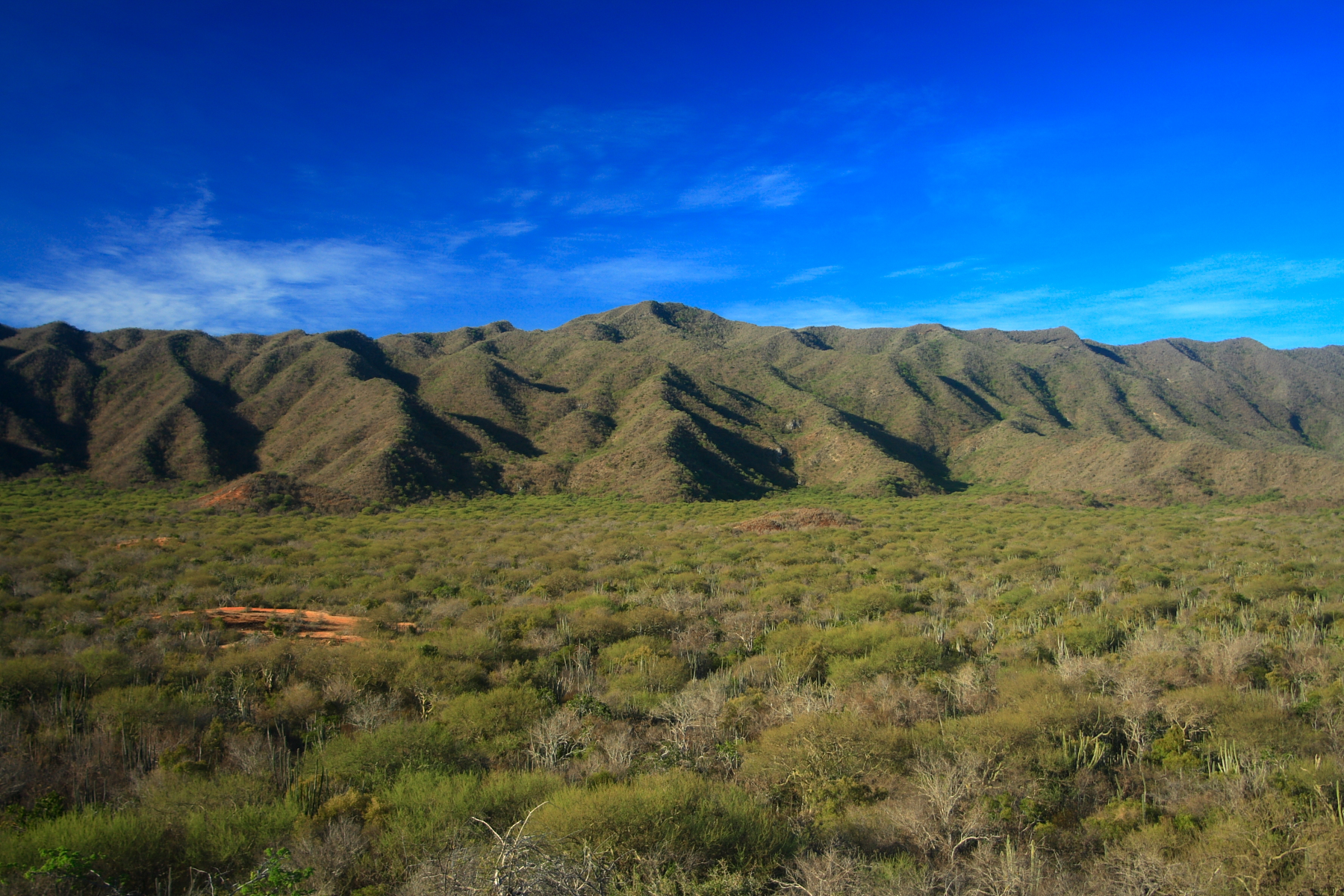
The highest elevation in the península.

The Araya Peninsula is a peninsula on the Caribbean Sea, located in Sucre State, northern Venezuela.

It extends westward and encloses a long bay which opens to the west. To the north is Margarita Island. The town of Araya is located on its westernmost extremity. The peninsula is part of the eastern Serranía del Litoral mountain range, in the Venezuelan Coastal Ranges System of the northern Andes.

The western tip of the Araya Peninsula is known for its large, purple-colored natural salt pans, which became a major site of salt mining during the colonial era. The salt mines of the Araya Peninsula were the setting of the award-winning 1959 documentary film Araya by filmmaker Margot Benacerraf.

The Dutch and the salt pans: The Dutch North Sea fishing fleet needed a great deal of salt to preserve its catch. When the war made Iberian salt inaccessible, from about 1599 the Dutch began illegally loading salt at Araya. The salt here was said to be unusually good and inexhaustible. The Dutch also engaged in smuggling and petty piracy, threatened the pearl fishery on Margarita Island and were too numerous for the local Spanish to deal with. In 1605 a fleet was sent from Spain. They captured a dozen or more ships and sent their crews to the galleys. Next year the Dutch were back. During the twelve years’ truce the Dutch shifted back to Iberia, but when it expired in 1621 they came back. The Spanish established a fort and garrison. In the next two years there were battles and the Dutch were driven out. The Dutch then shifted to places like Bonaire, Saint Martin (island) and La Tortuga Island.

== See also ==
- Cariaco Basin
- Paria Peninsula
