= The Hour of the Furnaces =

- Directed by: Octavio Getino; Fernando Solanas
- Written by: Octavio Getino; Fernando Solanas
- Produced by: Edgardo Pallero; Fernando Solanas
- Narrated by: María de la Paz; Fernando Solanas; Edgardo Suárez
- Cinematography: Juan Carlos Desanzo; Fernando Solanas
- Music by: Roberto Lar; Fernando Solanas
- Production companies: Grupo Cine Liberacion; Solanas Productions
- Release date: 1968
- Running time: 260 minutes
- Country: Argentina
- Language: Spanish

The Hour of the Furnaces (Spanish: La hora de los hornos) is a 1968 Argentine political documentary film directed by Octavio Getino and Fernando Solanas. 'The paradigm of revolutionary activist cinema', it addresses the politics of the 'Third worldist' films and Latin-American manifesto of the late 1960s. It is a key part of the 'Third Cinema', a movement that emerged in Latin America around the same time as the film's release. The work is a four-hour trilogy, divided into chapters and united by the theme of dependency and liberation. The first part - "Neo-Colonialism and Violence" - is conceived for diffusion in all types of circuits, and is the one presented at Cannes Classics.

In a survey of the 100 greatest films of Argentine cinema carried out by the Museo del Cine Pablo Ducrós Hicken in 2000, the film reached the 22nd position. In a new version of the survey organized in 2022 by the specialized magazines La vida útil, Taipei and La tierra quema, presented at the Mar del Plata International Film Festival, the film reached the 6th position.

== Title ==
The name of the film derives from a speech by Jose Martí quoted by Che Guevara in what would become his final public declaration.

== Background ==
In 1965, Fernando Solanas and Octavio Getino began collaborating on a documentary film that would serve as a witness to Argentina's reality. They began gathering archival material – newsreels – and testimony from Peronist Resistance fighters, intellectuals, and university leaders. The filmmakers' quest took them all throughout the nation, as evidenced by the subtitle of the film: 'Notes and Testimonies on Neocolonialism, Violence, and Liberation.'

The filmmakers gradually amended their original concept and part of their thoughts during this procedure (which lasted from late 1965 to mid-1968). They included a revisionist perspective of history as well as a focus on the Peronist working class as the central figure in Argentina's revolutionary change. They, like many other intellectuals in those years, underwent a transformation from the old left to a national left. Because of the film's adherence to forbidden Peronism, particularly its most extreme wing, its revolutionary demands, and the desire to inscribe it into the fights for social change, they had to resort to an alternate screening circuit when a new military dictatorship came to power in 1966.

Audiovisual counterpoint, the relationship between sound and image is integral to the film's establishment of its themes. For example, in the first part of the film, a series of wealthy individuals watch a cattle auction. The film cuts between the wealthy people and the cattle in rapid succession while the announcer describes the cows. This form of montage results in the viewer seeing the event as a kind of performance by the rich, expressing their best qualities in order to gain social status.

== Analysis ==
The Hour of the Furnaces captures many of the struggles and issues faced by Argentinians in the 1960s. The classism is largely noticed as in the movie as the poor get poorer, and those who are able to gain an education, opportunities, born into wealthier families, etc. They are able to grow more and become the middle/ upper class of society. Those that are not able to be given the same opportunities continue to struggle and are placed in extreme poverty in the Argentinian rural areas. The documentary also displays some of the cons that come with a capitalist states that are not able to give everyone the same opportunities due to lack of resources, classism, or desire for more wealth while others struggle.

The film also portrays how mass communications is the place for war. Mass communication is very effective in either silencing populations or in activating them. In the film the mobilization of the masses are silenced. Information is censored to try and get people to forget about their situation. If people know nothing else, their situation becomes normal.

== Participants ==
- María de la Paz as a narrator
- Fernando E. Solanas as a narrator
- Edgardo Suárez as a narrator
- Fidel Castro as himself (archive footage)
- Ernesto 'Che' Guevara as himself (archive footage)
- Mao Zedong as himself (archive footage)
- Eva Perón as herself (archive footage)
- Juan Domingo Perón as himself (archive footage)

== Production and distribution ==
The production of The Hour of the Furnaces lasted from 1966 to 1968 and utilized techniques that have since then been described as "guerilla style filmmaking," and a documentary-like style to convey its message. The team behind The Hour of the Furnaces recorded citizens of Argentina as they went about their daily lives, supplementing their work with archival footage and works by other filmmakers. Perhaps the most notably, The Hour of the Furnaces features a section from the 1960 Argentinian film Tire dié (English: Throw a Dime). In addition to the archival footage and documentary work, some scenes of The Hour of the Furnaces were recreations by the filmmakers.

Due to political considerations of the time, The Hour of the Furnaces saw an incredibly limited release in Argentina and was primarily shown in underground clubs and organizations. The film was segmented into several parts with the intention that viewers would take the time to discuss each individual section after it was completed.

== Reception and impact ==
Writing in the New York Times, critic Vincent Canby described the movie as "a unique film exploration of a nation's soul."

In Argentina, the emergence of La Hora de los Hornos sparked a surge in militant filmmaking. Grupo Cine Liberación began screening the film on a clandestine exhibition circuit as soon as it was completed, aided by mobile units in the major cities. Simultaneously, the group released materials on political cinema (including their best-known manifesto, Towards a Third Cinema).

== Prizes ==
- Mostra Internazionale del Cinema Nuovo (Pesaro, Italy, 1968): Gran Premio de la Crítica
- Festival Internacional de Manheim (West Germany, 1968): Premio del Publico; Premio FIPRESCI, Cines de Arte y Ensayo; Premio Ecuménico.
- British Film Institute: Best Foreign Film (1974)
- Crítica de Los Angeles: One of the Ten Best Films of the 1970s
- Festival de Mérida (Venezuela, 1968): Best Film Prize
- Semana de la crítica del Festival de Cannes (1969)

(Information from Fernando Solanas's official site.)

== See also ==
- Third Cinema
