= Culpa (film) =

1993 film by Jorge Molina Enríquez

- Directed by: Jorge Molina
- Release date: 1993
- Country: Cuba

Culpa (Spanish: Guilt), sometimes referred to as Molina's Culpa, is a 1993 film directed by Cuban film director Jorge Molina. It is a black-and-white film that pioneered a postmodern use of Noir, blood, gore and pornography genres in Cuba. It tells the story of a priest and a prostitute who start a relationship while a serial killer is on the loose. It was Jorge Molina's thesis while studying at the EICTV (Escuela Internacional de Cine y TV de San Antonio de los Baños).
