= A Very Old Man with Enormous Wings (film) =

1989 film

- Directed by: Fernando Birri
- Screenplay by: Fernando Birri; Gabriel García Márquez (collaboration)
- Starring: Daisy Granados
- Cinematography: Raúl Pérez Ureta
- Edited by: Jorge Abello
- Music by: Gianni Nocenzi; José María Vitier
- Release date: 1988
- Language: Spanish

A Very Old Man with Enormous Wings (Spanish: Un señor muy viejo con unas alas enormes) is a 1988 fantasy drama film written and directed by Fernando Birri. It entered the main competition at the 45th Venice International Film Festival.

== Cast ==
- Daisy Granados as Elisenda
- Asdrúbal Meléndez as Pelayo
- Luis Alberto Ramírez as Father Gonzaga
- Fernando Birri as the old angel
- Silvia Planas as Eulalia

== Production ==
The film is based on Gabriel García Márquez's short story with the same name. It is a co-production between Cuba, Italy and Spain.

== Release ==
The film premiered at the 45th edition of the Venice Film Festival, in the main competition section. It was later screened at the 13th Toronto International Film Festival.

== Reception ==
A contemporary Variety review praised the film, describing it as "colorful", "gently sardonic", and characterized by "explosive colors and merry music". La Repubblica's film critic Alberto Farassino panned it, calling it as "folkloric, artisanal cinema, nestled in lush Third World poverty", and noting the direction lacks "that extra spark of life into it that sets the imagination soaring beyond the screen."

The New York Times' Caryn James criticized Birri's choice of modifying the original story, eliminating Garcia Marquez's "usual sense of wonder" and "destroying the film's essential mystery".
