= Jorge Molina Enríquez =

Cuban actor and film director (born 1966)

- Born: 1966 (age 59–60); Palma Soriano, Cuba
- Occupations: Actor, film director

Jorge Molina Enríquez (born 1966 in Palma Soriano in the province of Santiago) is a Cuban actor and film director. After studying cinema in the USSR, he graduated from the Escuela Internacional de Cine y Television (International Film and TV School of San Antonio de los Baños, Cuba), known as EICTV. Since his film, Molina's Culpa he has been interested in bizarro as genre films and is considered a cult film director.

== Career ==
His career as a filmmaker encompasses both independent productions outside the traditional institutional circuits of Cuban cinema, within a context marked by the growth of independent audiovisual production in Cuba from the late twentieth and early twenty-first centuries,and projects produced in collaboration with state institutions.He has participated in numerous film productions, developing a distinctive acting presence within the contemporary Cuban scene. His work is characterized by his portrayal of eccentric, marginalized, or transgressive characters, both in his own productions and in films by other filmmakers. His performance as Lázaro in Juan of the Dead was highlighted by The Guardian as “part of the film’s comic and satirical core.” Several reviews have likewise singled out the film’s leading duo, with his character appearing alongside Juan in the narrative structure of several reviews published by specialized media. Among his own films and his collaborations on approximately eighty audiovisual productions are works spanning fiction, horror, science fiction, and experimental cinema.Notable collaborations include projects with Fernando Pérez and Juan Carlos Cremata, as well as theatrical work with Jazz Vilá Projects. In 2008 Jorge Molina won funds from CINERGIA (Fund for the Promotion of the Audiovisual in Central America and the Caribbean). The jury granted Molina $10,000 to produce his short film Molina's Ferrozz, based on Charles Perraul's fairytale "Little Red Riding Hood". When he received the funds, Panamanian writer and frequent collaborator Edgar Soberón Torchia suggested he could extend the script, Molina agreed and he finally directed his first feature film, which was exhibited during the annual film festival in Havana. In 2018 he released Molina's Margarita. Molina was the cultural liaison at the EICTV, and also teaches directing at the Instituto Superior de Arte in Havana. He lives in Havana with his wife and their two daughters.

== Filmography ==
=== As actor ===
Año	Título	Papel	Referencia
1994	Madagascar	Molina	
1998	La vida es silbar	Cycle Driver	
2007	Madrigal	Él mismo	
2010	Acorazado	Alberto	
2010	Club Habana	Manolo	
2010	Amor crónico	Él mismo	
2011	Juan of the Dead	Lázaro	
2012	Day of the Flowers	Jorge	
2013	Esther Somewhere	Larry Po	
2014	Contigo pan y cebolla	Anselmo	
2016	Four Seasons in Havana	Antonio Rangel	

=== As director ===
1992	Molina’s Culpa (film)	narrative short	18 min
2000	Fría Jennie	narrative short	10 min
2001	Molina’s Test	narrative short	25 min
2006	Molina’s Solarix	narrative short	24 min
2008	Molina’s Mofo	narrative short	40 min
2009	Molina’s El hombre que hablaba con Marte	narrative short	29 min
2009	Molina’s Fantasy	narrative short	10 min
2010	Molina’s Ferozz	narrative feature	73 min
2013	Molina’s Borealis	narrative short	—
2014	Sarima (Molina’s Borealis 2)	narrative short	—
2016	Molina’s Rebecca	narrative short	—
2018	Molina’s Margarita	narrative short	—
2024	La última pelea	narrative short	—
2026	Molina’s Redemption	narrative feature	Preproduction
