= Carlos Rebolledo =

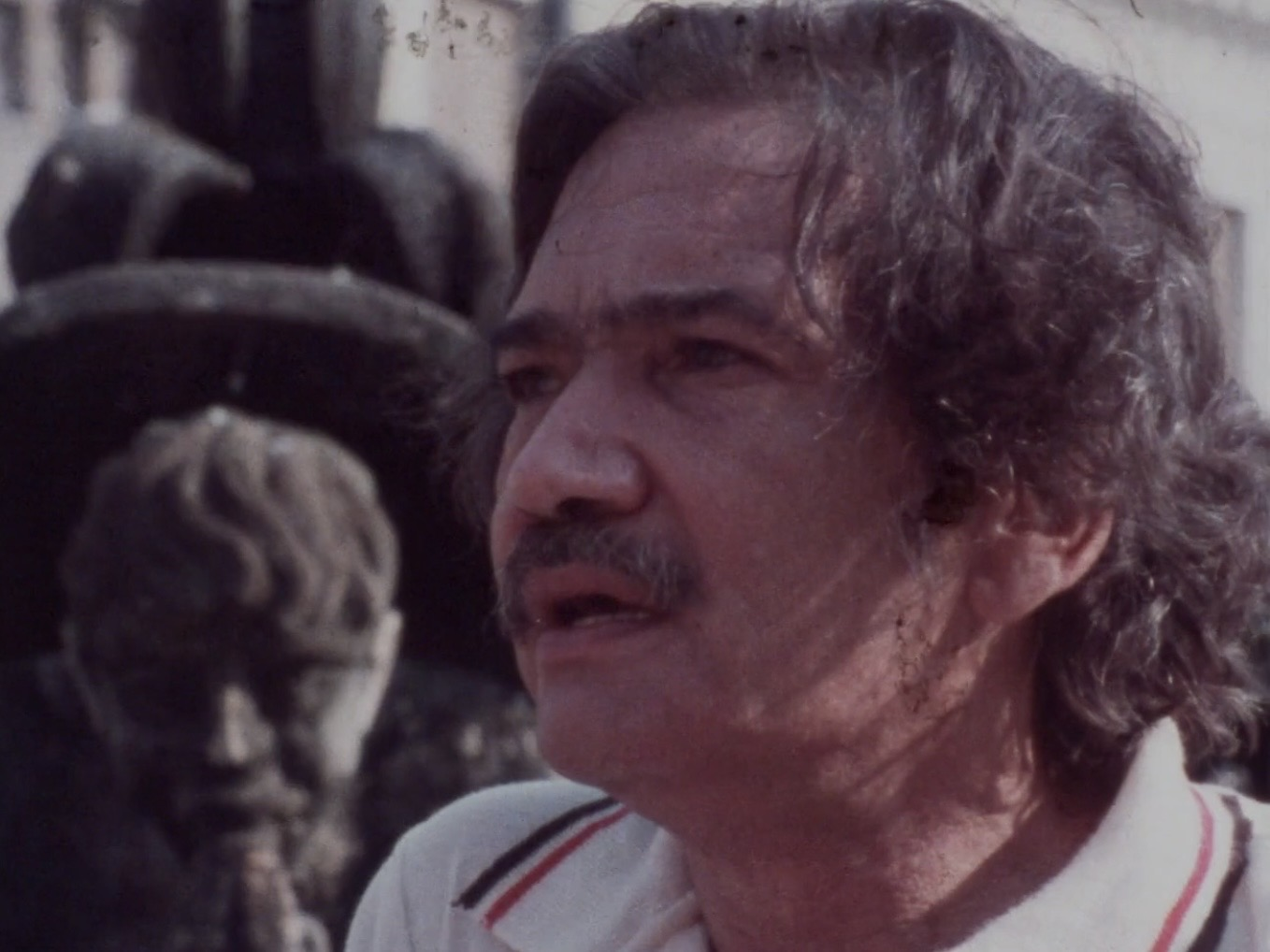
- Born: November 26, 1933; Chuao, Venezuela
- Died: March 23, 1994 (aged 60); Caracas, Venezuela
- Occupation: Filmmaker
- Employer: Department of Cinema of the University of the Andes
- Movement: Third Cinema, New Venezuelan Cinema
- Spouse(s): Leonor Pulgar; María de los Ángeles Chantada (1982–1994)
- Children: Santiago Rebolledo Pulgar; Alejandro Rebolledo Pulgar

Carlos Rebolledo (Chuao, 26 November 1933 – Caracas, 23 March 1994) was a Venezuelan filmmaker, recognized as one of the central figures of political documentary cinema in Venezuela during the 1960s and 1970s. His work is associated with the rise of New Latin American Cinema. He was the founder and director of the Department of Cinema of the University of the Andes, an institution from which he promoted a body of documentary work with a political and experimental character. He is especially known for the medium-length film Pozo muerto (1967), considered one of the most influential Venezuelan documentaries on the social and environmental consequences of oil extraction.

== Career ==
Rebolledo studied at the Institut des hautes études cinématographiques (IDHEC) in Paris. In the early 1960s he made institutional and cultural documentaries about heritage and urban planning, including La casa natal del Libertador (1964) and Arquitectura y urbanismo en Caracas (1965).

In 1967 he was hired by the University of the Andes (Venezuela) to found the Department of Cinema within its Directorate of Culture. He soon took on coordination and leadership roles in the area, from which he promoted a production model combining university newsreels, social documentaries, and technical training for new filmmakers. His participation in the Viña del Mar Film Festival in the late 1960s brought him closer to the debates of New Latin American Cinema. From then on, he oriented his work toward an aesthetic of denunciation and structural analysis of Venezuelan reality, particularly the impact of oil and underdevelopment.

During his tenure at the Department of Cinema of the University of the Andes, he collaborated with filmmakers such as Jorge Solé and Edmundo Aray, and helped establish Mérida as one of the hubs of Venezuelan documentary filmmaking. He was a professor at the School of Social Communication of the Central University of Venezuela, in the cinematography specialization.

== Personal life ==
He was married to sociologist Leonor Pulgar. They had two children, Santiago Rebolledo Pulgar and Alejandro Rebolledo Pulgar (1970–2016), a Venezuelan journalist and writer. He later married María de los Ángeles Chantada, remaining married to her until his death.

== Filmography ==
=== Documentaries ===
- La casa natal del Libertador (1964)
- Arquitectura y urbanismo en Caracas (1965)
- Pozo muerto (1967)
- Noti-ULA 1 (1968, co-directed with Jorge Solé)
- Noti-ULA 2 (1968, co-directed with Jorge Solé)
- Los Andes y su universidad (1969, co-directed with Jorge Solé)
- Venezuela, tres tiempos: fragmentos del anti-desarrollo (1974, co-directed with Edmundo Aray)
- El IVIC (1975)

=== Fiction ===
- Alias: el rey del joropo (1978, co-directed with Thaelman Urgelles)
- Profesión: vivir (1985)
