= José María Vitier =

- Born: January 7, 1954 (age 72)
- Origin: Cuba
- Genres: Classical music, film score, Sacred music.
- Occupations: Composer, pianist
- Instrument: Piano
- Years active: 1973 – present

José María Vitier (born January 7, 1954) is a Cuban music composer and pianist. He has made music for movies and television, as well as compositions for piano, symphonic orchestra, chamber orchestra, among other formats. His style often combines the classical and Cuban folk music styles. Some of his most remarkable works are his compositions for the Cuban film Fresa y Chocolate, and his Cuban mass. He won the Golden Osella for Un señor muy viejo con unas alas enormes (1988).

== Biography ==
José María Vitier was born in Havana on 7 January 1954. He studied under Margot Rojas and César López at the Roldán Conservatory. He composed music for plays, movies and television.

== Works on movies and TV ==
=== On movies ===
==== Animated cartoons ====
- Aborígenes. 1986, ICAIC.

==== Documentary short films ====
- Bibliotecas infantiles. 1975, ICAIC.
- Dieciséis años después. 1977, ICAIC.
- La casa de Mario. 1977, ICAIC.
- Viento del pueblo. 1979, ICAIC.
- Elaboración técnica. 1980, ICAIC.
- A Bayamo en coche. 1981, ICAIC.
- Carniceros de la Sierra. 1981, ICAIC.
- Tiendas del pueblo. 1981, ICAIC.
- Jíbaro. 1982, ICAIC.
- Con el corazón en la tierra. 1982, ICAIC.
- Camilo. 1982, ICAIC.
- Causa 37. 1983, ICAIC.
- Una vida para dos. 1985, ICAIC.
- Ella vendía coquitos. 1986, ICAIC.
- Mientras el río pasa. 1986, ICAIC.
- Máximo. 1986, ICAIC.
- La Morriña. 1982, ICAIC y Multimedia M Conseil.
- El gran puente. 1995, ICAIC.
- Imágenes y palabras que cuentan lo que somos. 1995, ICAIC.
- José María. 1996, ICAIC.
- Misa Cubana. 1996, ICAIC.

==== Fiction short films ====
- Contradanza No. 2. 1989.
- 2 Feet, 1 Angel. 1997.

==== Fiction and documentary feature films and half-running films ====
- La Habana te espera. 1987, INDER-ICAIC.
- Nicolás. 1982, ICRT.
- Africa, círculo del infierno.. 1985, ICAIC.
- La isla del Tesoro Azul. 1985, ICAIC.

==== Fiction feature films ====
- Polvo rojo. 1982, ICAIC.
- Techo de vidrio. 1982, ICAIC.
- El corazón sobre la tierra. 1983, ICAIC.
- En tres y dos. 1985, ICAIC.
- A Very Old Man with Enormous Wings. 1988, ICAIC y TV Española.
- Río Negro. 1989.
- El Siglo de las Luces. 1992, ICAIC, S.F.P. (France), TV Española, Yalta Film D.
- Mascaró, el cazador americano. 1992, ICAIC, TV Española, University of Los Andes of Venezuela.
- Fresa y chocolate. 1993, ICAIC, Tele-Madrid, SGAE, IMCINE, Tabasco Filmes México.
- El elefante y la bicicleta. 1994, ICAIC, CHANNEL TV.
- Salón México. 1995, TELEVICINE (México).
- Cosas que dejé en La Habana. 1997, Tornason Filme.
- Un embrujo. 1998.
- Cuarteto de La Habana. 1999, Aurum Productions.
- Un paraíso bajo las estrellas. 1999, ICAIC-Wanda Filme.
- Lista de Espera. 2000, Tornasol/ICAIC.
- La película de mi padre. 2006, Bucanero Filmes / ICAIC.

== Awards ==
=== Academy Award nomination ===
1994: Best Foreign Language Film: - Strawberry and Chocolate (Fresa y Chocolate)
