= The Adventures of Juan Quin Quin =

1967 film

- Directed by: Julio García Espinosa
- Written by: Samuel Feijóo; Julio García Espinosa
- Produced by: Julio García Espinosa
- Starring: Júlio Martínez
- Cinematography: Jorge Haydu
- Release date: July 1967
- Running time: 112 minutes
- Country: Cuba
- Language: Spanish

The Adventures of Juan Quin Quin (Spanish: Las aventuras de Juan Quin Quin) is a 1967 Cuban comedy film directed by Julio García Espinosa and starring Júlio Martínez. It was entered in the 5th Moscow International Film Festival.

== Cast ==
- Júlio Martínez as Juan Quin Quin
- Erdwin Fernández as Jachero
- Adelaida Raymat as Teresa
- Enrique Santiesteban as Der Feind
- Agustín Campos
- Blanca Contreras

== See also ==
- List of Cuban films
