= Sara Gómez =

Cuban filmmaker (1942–1974)

- Born: Sara Gómez Yera; November 8, 1942; Guanabacoa, La Habana Province, Cuba
- Died: June 2, 1974 (aged 31); Havana, Cuba
- Years active: 1962–1974
- Organization: ICAIC
- Notable work: De cierta manera (1977)
- Spouse(s): Germinal Hernandez, Hector Veitia
- Children: 3

Sara Gómez (November 8, 1942 – June 2, 1974), also known as Sarita Gómez, was a Cuban film director and screenwriter. She was a member of the Cuban Institute of Cinematographic Art and Industry during her early years, where she was one of only two black filmmakers, as well as the institute's first—and in her lifetime, Cuba's only—female director. Gómez is best known for her only feature-length film De Cierta Manera (released posthumously, 1977).

Gómez was a revolutionary filmmaker, concerned with representing the Afro-Cuban community, women's issues, and the treatment of the marginalized sectors of society. Her work highlighted inequalities of social class, as well as racial and gender discrimination. She used the lens of her camera and ethnographic knowledge to narrate histories about everyday lives in revolutionary Cuba.

Gómez filmmaking identifies the problems of colonialism, specifically experienced by previously marginalized communities (black people, women, poor, religious, and young people) who were unaware of the possibilities of a better future. "Exposing the roots of the world that had to be left behind and demanding the arrival of the future: her mission was to allow these communities to understand the process of what was happening in their lives, their needs, and possible departures."

== Early life and education ==
Trained as a musician and ethnographer, Sara Gómez came from the folkloric Havana neighborhood of Guanabacoa – traditionally viewed as one of the epicenters of Afro-Cuban popular culture, as well as a marginal sector of Cuba that has many issues such as racism and gender inequality which was depicted later on in her films. She studied music (piano), literature, and Afro-Cuban ethnography. "Raised by her paternal grandmother and four aunts, she grew up surrounded by Afro-Cuban professionals, including family members who played in the Havana Philharmonic Orchestra, and attended dances at black recreational societies like the Porvenir and El Club Progreso (The Progressive Club), which inspired her studies at the Conservatory of Music in Havana." Gómez was not poor or uneducated. Being brought up around scholars and art that shaped the culture around her, she used her voice to represent those who do not like those seen in her work. Gómez explored journalism by writing for the youth magazine Mella and for the Communist Party newspaper Noticias de Hoy (News of Today) – before taking a position at the newly formed Instituto Cubano del Arte e Industria Cinematográficos (ICAIC). At the ICAIC she served as assistant director to Jorge Fraga, Tomás Gutiérrez Alea, and Agnès Varda. She became the first female film director in Cuba. Gómez made a series of documentary shorts on assigned topics before directing her first feature-length film. Cuban directors see documentaries as an important training ground because it forces them to focus on the material reality of Cuba, consequently, emphasizing filmmaking as an expression or tool of the culture. Gómez directed multiple short documentaries which emphasized and criticized the Cuban revolutionary society. Her short films explored the positions of women and Afro-Cubans within society.

== Personal life ==
She married fellow director Hector Veitia and had daughter Iddia. In 1967 on set of Y tenemos sabor she met Germinal Hernandez. They met working together, she was the director and he was a sound technician. They started an affair and later married and had two children, Ibis and Alfredo. Sara was chronically asthmatic.

== Career ==
=== De Cierta Manera (One Way or Another) ===
Sara Gómez's last film, the hybrid narrative/documentary De cierta manera, (translated for US audiences as One Way or Another) has been hailed as the "first movie to truly explore conflicting threads of racial and gender identity within a revolutionary context." This revolutionary film was produced by the ICAIC in 1974. This film takes place in Miraflores, a lower-class neighborhood in Havana, Cuba. This film addresses issues of class, race, and gender after the 1959 Cuban Revolution. This film shifts between a documentary style that analyzes the revolution and a fictitious love story that challenges the attitudes around race, social class and gender in Cuban culture.Sara Gomez chooses both professional actors and nonprofessional actors to represent the issues of story and in real life: the conflict between Cuba marginal population's life and the Revolution. At the beginning of the film Gomez Says it is "a film about real people, and some fictitious ones." Noted Cuban film scholar Michael Chanan observes that the film is "an aesthetically radical film...mix[ing]...fiction and documentary, in the most original way...by using real people to play themselves alongside professional actors." Haseenah Ebrahim writes about how Gómez's work brings attention to religious groups such as the Abakuá, "Afrocuban religions make an appearance in the films and videos of almost all Afrocuban filmmakers, and feature prominently in the work of Gómez..." and highlights the importance of Sara Gómez's background as a black Cuban woman in cinema by noting, "In the case of both Gómez and Rolando, race has functioned to provide a perspective that is not mirrored in the work of non-black Cuban filmmakers. Significantly, both women self-identified themselves as black Cubans: Sara Gómez has been quoted as saying she did not want to be 'just another middle-class black woman who plays the piano'". Essayist Roberto Zurbano Torres states, "it is also essential to mark her commitment to popular culture and her critical and self-critical passion through which she expressed the complexity of a world under construction: contributing a cinema of conscience, pointing out the virtues and defects of a social process that tried to change the world from an island in the Caribbean." Gómez died before the film could be completed and so Tomás Gutiérrez Alea, Rigoberto Lopez, and Julio García Espinosa supervised the sound-mix and post-production stages of preparing One way or Another for theatrical release. The film was not released for a few years because of technical problems such as damaged negative that were sent to Sweden for repairing.

=== Legacy ===
Gómez's 1974 film De cierta manera (One Way or Another) remained the only feature film by a Cuban woman until 2008, when Rebeca Chávez released Ciudad en rojo (City in Red). As of 2011, Gómez remained the only Cuban women filmmaker to have directed a feature-length film produced by the ICAIC. She is still the only black women to be a part of this institution. Gómez's films are used in feminist studies due to their reflections of marginalization. Susan Lord, a professor in the Film and Media department at Queen's University in Ontario, Canada wrote that Gómez's films embody feminist, radical, and democracy.

The content of Gómez's work depicted scenes of life that existed in Cuba during a time of revolution. By employing ethnographic techniques, the themes in her work exposed discrimination in terms of race, gender and class. A critical analysis conducted by Devyn Spence Benson, a historian of 19th and 20th century Latin America, concluded that Gómez's films advocated for a revolution that fought against discrimination of all forms. The framing of her films cast light upon the hostility that existed in a post 1959 Cuba concerning censorship and opportunities of equality. She captured the everyday lives of those living with minimal power, giving the viewer a glimpse of Afro-Cuban culture and politics. Providing this exposure gave an opportunity to be heard that had not been previously available to those with little power. The evidence of this new acknowledgement can be seen in Gómez's film Iré a Santiago, released in 1964, which pictured the city of Santiago through the daily actions of its people. The opening panoramic shots of Afro-Cuban women engaging in everyday work, usually accompanied with Cuban music, was one of the ways in which Gómez showed how the people and their experiences were central to the construction of a new Cuba. This created a lasting impact because her work had provided a channel of discourse about discrimination and the struggle for equality at the time.

In addition to the content of Gómez's work, her use of formal filmmaking techniques has also been analyzed and praised as innovative stylization fitting into the 1960s trend of imperfect cinema. This form of film was popular in Cuba around the period of 1968–88 and centered around the intentional use of aesthetic imperfections. This visual technique incited social discourse and analysis about the films themselves. An example of this can be found in Gómez's 1977 feature De cierta manera, where she employed the coalescence of actors and non-actors to film scenes of the non-actors' everyday lives. Gómez's work reflected the essence of the imperfect cinema tradition by supplying storylines which resonated with the audience's own life and experiences.

Gómez and her work were relatively unknown for many years, specifically in Cuba, due to the censorship of her films. The ICAIC had most of her documentaries restricted under censorship and they were stagnant in the institute archives until around 2007 when a group pushed for the digitization of her short films. The National Film Institute also had very little acknowledgement of Gómez and her career until 1989 when a special program was dedicated to her life.

== As a subject ==
=== Salut les Cubains ===
At the end of Agnès Varda's short documentary Salut les Cubains (1963), Sara Gómez is featured as a young filmmaker dancing Cha-cha-cha with her fellow ICAIC filmmakers (illustrated through photographic animation.) Agnès Varda describes Gómez in the documentary as one who, "directs didactic films." Throughout the production of this film, "She [Gómez] had the opportunity to accompany the prestigious gala director Agnès Varda in her tour of our country and collaborate with her in the documentary" Varda and Gomez became friends throughout the making of this film. "We got along well, and when the ICAIC told me I had to go to Santiago de Cuba, Sarita was chosen to come with me. We took a plane to Santiago together, we slept in rooms with twin beds, we talked a lot at night" (Varda).

=== Sara Gómez: An Afro-Cuban Filmmaker ===
In 2004, the Swiss filmmaker Alessandra Muller directed the documentary film: Sara Gómez: An Afro-Cuban Filmmaker (2004), supported both by ICAIC and Agnès Varda. This film which looks back on her life and revisits Gómez's family and friends. In the documentary, they describe her film sets as social events and emphasize that Sara would listen to everyone's input, of professionals and those who were not. Actor Mario Balmaseda notes "We spent a lot of time with people from this area, almost three, four months living with them sometimes sleeping and eating in their home, and this made it a lot easier. We slipped from a professional level into friendship." In the documentary, Sara Gómez is praised by her family as a woman who refused to choose between family and normal life. However, as she becomes increasingly involved in her job, her husband started to rebel against her work. In the end, she got divorced with her husband.

== Death ==
Gómez died while editing De cierta manera, at the age of 31, due to an asthma attack. She had chronic asthma and overall poor health due to complications while giving birth to her son.

== Filmography ==
=== Short films ===
- Plaza Vieja; El solar; Historia de la piratería; Solar habanero (1962)
  - One of Sara's first films. Documentary about the history of Plaza Vieja, located in Old Havana, Cuba.
- Iré a Santiago (1964)
  - The title was taken from a poem by Federico García Lorca. The film is photographed by Mario Garcia Joya. It portraits Santiago de Cuba and its people gently and yet its informal voice-over commentary also makes this film striking at that time.
- Excursión a Vueltabajo (1965)
  - Translated for US audiences as Trip to Vuelta Abajo. The film depicts the tobacco culture and its changes caused by the Revolution in one of Rinar del Rio's villages.
- Guanabacoa: Crónica de mi familia (1966)
- ... Y tenemos sabor (1967)
  - This is the third film of Sara Gomez. It is a Cuban music documentary.
- En la otra isla(1967)
  - Translated for US audiences as On the other Island. The film is a 40-minute collection of interviews of people on the island. The interviewees includes a seventeen-year-old girl who wants to be a hairdresser; a man who works as a cowboy during the day and runs a theater group at night; a farmer who used to be a tenor in Havana; an ex-seminarian; a girl at reformatory and a woman responsible for her. The interviews show the subjects as both complete human beings and representation of certain social identity at that time.
- Una isla para Miguel (1968)
  - Translated for US audiences as An island for Miguel. The film starts with a case study of boy being disciplined. Then to the Interviews with the boy's mother, poor homes and countless children abandoned by her husband who leave with his boyfriend. Interviews like this are rare in Cuba.
- Isla del tesoro (1969)
  - Translated for US audiences as Treasure Island. It is a short and happy film essay. It cuts between shots of the Model Penitentiary, where Fidel was prisoned by Batista in the pseudo republic years and citrus fruit production that was packed and named "Treasure Island Grapefruit Produce of Cuba".
- Poder local, poder popular (1970)
  - Translated for US audiences as Local power, Popular power. The film talks about political issues.
- Un documental a propósito del tránsito; De bateyes (1971)
  - Translated for US audiences as A documentary about traffic. In the film, Sara investigates the technical problem of city traffic.
- Atención prenatal(1972)
  - Translated for US audiences as Prenatal attention. It is a 10 minutes short film.
- Año uno; Mi aporte (1972)
  - Translated for US audiences as First year. It is a 10 minutes short film.
- Sobre horas extras y trabajo voluntario (1973)
  - Translated for US audiences as On overtime and voluntary work.

=== Feature length ===
- De cierta manera (1977)

=== As an Assistant Director ===
- Salut les Cubains (1963) dir. Agnès Varda
- Cumbite (1964) dir. Tomas Gutierez Alea
- El Robo (1965) dir. Jorge Fraga

== See also ==
- Cinema of Cuba
