= Anne von Petersdorff =

German documentary filmmaker, writer and producer

- Born: Anne Christin von Petersdorff-Campen; May 5, 1985 (age 41); Germany
- Education: Europa-Universität Flensburg (MA); Michigan State University (PhD); Escuela Internacional de Cine y Televisión
- Occupations: Documentary filmmaker, writer, producer, scholar
- Years active: 2009–present
- Known for: Juan Carlos: Downfall of the King (2023); Elon Musk Unveiled – The Tesla Experiment (2025)
- Website: annevonpetersdorff.com

Anne von Petersdorff (full name Anne Christin von Petersdorff-Campen) is a German documentary filmmaker, writer and producer based in Berlin, working mainly in long-form investigative documentary for international broadcast. She made her directorial debut on the four-part series Juan Carlos: Downfall of the King (2023), which premiered in competition at Canneseries and was nominated for the Grimme-Preis and twice for the Deutscher Fernsehpreis. She was writer and executive producer of the feature documentary Elon Musk Unveiled – The Tesla Experiment (2025), which draws on leaked internal company data to examine Tesla, Inc. and Elon Musk.

Von Petersdorff holds a PhD in German Studies from Michigan State University and is a co-founder and editor-in-chief of the digital publications constellations and agnès films. She works as a producer and executive producer at the documentary company gebrueder beetz filmproduktion.

== Early life and education ==
Anne von Petersdorff was born on 5 May 1985 in Germany. She grew up in northern Germany. She studied international tourism and leisure in the Netherlands, and completed a Master of Arts in Kultur–Sprache–Medien (Culture–Language–Media) at the Europa-Universität Flensburg. She additionally trained in documentary filmmaking at the Escuela Internacional de Cine y Televisión (EICTV) in Cuba.

From 2013 to 2018 she completed a PhD in German Studies, with a graduate certificate in digital humanities, at Michigan State University, where she also taught as a lecturer. Her hybrid dissertation consisted of a feature-length autobiographical travel documentary intertwined with a theoretical and historical exploration of film aesthetics, feminist filmmaking, and postcolonial theories of representation.

== Career ==
=== Early career and independent film ===
Von Petersdorff began her career as a production assistant and post-production supervisor in Hamburg. Her first feature documentary, Wanderlust, cuerpos en tránsito (2017), an Argentine–German co-production co-directed with María Pérez Escalá, follows an overland journey from Egypt to Germany. It was developed at the Mar del Plata International Film Festival, won the "La voz que rompe el silencio" prize at the Festival Internacional de Cine de Fusagasugá in 2017, and opened theatrically at the Cine Gaumont in Buenos Aires.

She has served on the selection committee of the Festival de Cine Latinoamericano in La Plata, Argentina (2015), and on the editorial committee that chose the non-fiction projects for Conecta FICTION & ENTERTAINMENT in Toledo (2023). During this period, she also contributed to several high-profile international documentary projects. This included serving as an editorial assistant on The Forum (2019) and working on the acclaimed documentary series Nisman: The Prosecutor, the President and the Spy (2020) and Reeperbahn Spezialeinheit FD65 – Hamburgs Kampf gegen das organisierte Verbrechen (2022).

=== Investigative documentary series ===
At gebrueder beetz filmproduktion she made her directorial debut on the four-part Sky Original series Juan Carlos: Downfall of the King (2023), on the financial and personal scandals surrounding the former Spanish king Juan Carlos I, co-directed with Georg Tschurtschenthaler and Jan Zabeil and co-written with Christian Beetz and Pedro Barbadillo. It premiered in competition at Canneseries, won best documentary series at the TV Series Festival in Berlin, and was nominated for the Grimme-Preis 2024 and two Deutscher Fernsehpreis awards. Von Petersdorff has described the research as conducted under surveillance, with the team taking precautions against being monitored during filming.

She was writer and executive producer on Elon Musk Unveiled – The Tesla Experiment (2025; German title Elon Musk Uncovered – Das Tesla Experiment), directed by Andreas Pichler for ARD and Sky, which draws on leaked internal company data and whistleblower accounts to examine Tesla, Inc. and Elon Musk. The film premiered in the Frontlight section of IDFA in November 2025, screened at festivals including CPH:DOX and Sheffield DocFest, and won the audience award at the Bolzano Film Festival, before its German cinema release and Das Erste broadcast in 2026. The Süddeutsche Zeitung wrote that it "demystifies the man once celebrated as a visionary".

== Academic and editorial work ==
Von Petersdorff publishes on documentary practice, feminist film studies and digital humanities. She is a strong advocate for public-facing digital scholarship and has hosted digital dissertation workshops to bridge the gap between academia and the public. She is a co-founder and editor-in-chief of the digital publications constellations: a cultural rhetorics publishing space and agnès films: supporting women and feminist filmmakers.

== Filmography ==
- 2009 – Germany 09: 13 Short Films About the State of the Nation (set runner)
- 2009 – The Last Fare (Stille Nacht) (producer, production manager)
- 2017 – Wanderlust, cuerpos en tránsito (co-director, producer)
- 2019 – The Forum (editorial assistant)
- 2020 – Nisman: The Prosecutor, the President and the Spy (production team)
- 2021 – Reeperbahn Spezialeinheit FD65 – Hamburgs Kampf gegen das organisierte Verbrechen (additional writing)
- 2021 – Viral Dreams (associate producer)
- 2023 – Juan Carlos: Downfall of the King (co-director, co-writer)
- 2025 – Elon Musk Unveiled – The Tesla Experiment (writer, executive producer)

== Selected publications ==
- von Petersdorff-Campen, Anne (2024). "Traveling Bodies in Film: Embodied Encounters and Negotiating Selves". In Maruo-Schröder, Nicole; Schäfer-Althaus, Sarah; Schaffers, Uta (eds.). Traveling Bodies: Interdisciplinary Perspectives on Traveling as an Embodied Practice. Routledge Research in Travel Writing. Abingdon: Routledge. ISBN 978-1-032-36411-7.
- von Petersdorff, Anne (2018). Unexpected Journeys: At the Crossroads of Collaborative Filmmaking and Feminist Scholarship (PhD dissertation). Michigan State University.
- von Petersdorff, Anne. "Embodied Encounters: A Case for Autobiographical and Haptic Filmmaking". constellations: a cultural rhetorics publishing space, issue 1.
