= Portuguese Rhapsody =

1959 film

- Directed by: João Mendes
- Written by: Fernanda de Castro; António Ferro
- Produced by: Felipe de Solms
- Narrated by: Pedro Moutinho
- Cinematography: Mário Moreira
- Release date: 30 March 1959
- Running time: 86 minutes
- Country: Portugal
- Language: Portuguese

Portuguese Rhapsody (Portuguese: Rapsódia Portuguesa) is a 1959 Portuguese documentary film directed by João Mendes. It was entered into the 1959 Cannes Film Festival.
