= Reverón (1952 film) =

1952 Venezuelan documentary film

- Film title slate
- Directed by: Margot Benacerraf
- Written by: Margot Benacerraf
- Narrated by: Carlos Augusto León
- Cinematography: Boris Doroslovacki
- Music by: Guy Bernard
- Release date: 1952 (Venezuela)
- Country: Venezuela
- Language: Spanish

Reverón is a 1952 Venezuelan documentary film written and directed by Margot Benacerraf. The camera and photography was by Boris Doroslovacki, music by Guy Bernard and Venezuelan folklore, and narrated by Carlos Augusto León.

The film is an essay on madness and creativity through the life and work of Venezuelan painter Armando Reverón. It won the First Prize for Best Art Documentary at the First International Festival of Art Films (Caracas, 1952) and the "Cantaclaro" Award as the best Venezuelan film by unanimous verdict of the Venezuelan Film Press (March 1953). It had a successful tour in several countries, garnering enthusiastic reviews and was screened from 1953 at the Berlin Film Festival, the Cinémathèque française, the Belgian Cinémathèque, the Cannes Film Festival, the Edinburgh Film Festival, the Karlovy Vary Film Festival and other festivals and events.

It was selected by the French Association of Film and Television Critics to be part of the first opening program of the Studio Etoile in Paris as an Art Cinema (November 1953). Reverón is part of the Permanent Collection of the Eastman House Cinematheque (Rochester, N.Y.), the Museum of Modern Art in New York and the Cinémathèque Française in Paris.

== Plot ==
Armando Reverón is a painter who lives in retirement with his partner, Juanita, on the Central Venezuelan coast town of Macuto. On the seashore he has built with his own hands a building of stones and palms called El Castillete, which serves as a house and workshop where he lives in harmony with nature. Reverón has not painted for a long time, but he finally takes up painting again and creates what will be his last self-portrait. The film is an approach to the life and work of the artist throughout the 24 hours of a day.

== Production ==
Gaston Diehl, cultural attaché of the French Embassy in Venezuela and art critic, was a pioneer of the art documentary in cinema. Together with director Alain Resnais, he made a film about the painter Vincent Van Gogh, the first of its kind. In Caracas, he was fascinated by Reverón's almost unknown work and decided to make a film that would vindicate the Venezuelan artist. He contacted Resnais but the latter could not come to the country due to previously acquired commitments. However, in those days, Diehl met Benacerraf, who was still studying film at the Institute of Higher Cinematographic Studies (IDHEC) in Paris and was passing through Caracas. He asked her to write a script for him as a preliminary step to making the film. The director accepted, thus beginning a long period of intense and difficult research and photographic compilation on the painter -of whom there was very little information at the time and whose works were scattered in various private collections- accompanied by frequent visits to El Castillete to get to know the character closely and create a climate of trust.

The script exceeded Diehl's expectations, who proceeded to organize a small production team for the filming and, at the end of 1951, Benacerraf went to Macuto with cameraman Boris Doroslovacki to begin shooting. In view of the irregularity of working with Reverón, who was quite ill and had frequent mood swings, the director decided to stay at the Castillete workshop, even during the nights. In this way, she was able to establish close ties with the artist's world and his daily life. This relationship of trust, in addition to a sustained and patient work of persuasion, was what allowed her to convince him to take up painting again and make his last self-portrait, an action that was essential to fit into the structure of the script.

Benacerraf approached the painter cinematographically from a script based on three lines that develop in parallel during one day: light, Reverón's life and his work. In the film, inside the Castillete, there is a circular shot through its interior before entering the workshop, where Reverón is found in front of the mirror, facing the canvas. From there begin the 24 hours that would cover his youth, the first paintings and the first hours of the day when he moves to Macuto; noon and afternoon, the point where maturity, incandescent light and the "white period" coincide until twilight and night, when he returns to his studio and finishes the self-portrait surrounded by his impressive dolls.

The filmed material was processed in Paris laboratories and the finished film was sent to Caracas to participate, in 1952, in the First International Art Film Festival organized by the Central University of Venezuela, where it won the Prize for Best Art Documentary.

== Reception and impact ==
The documentary had a significant success in Europe, part of the Americas and in Venezuela.

During its screening at the Berlin International Film Festival in 1953, the film received a standing ovation from the public and the best comments from the critics, who called it "a masterpiece in terms of direction". The success in Germany was followed that year by special presentations at the Cinémathèque Française, the Cinémathèque Belge and an enthusiastic reception at the Cannes Film Festival. Subsequently, Reverón was included in the section of films about Art in the Muestra Testimonios del Cine. The Masters of the Short Film, organized by the Cinémathèque Française at the Palais des Festivals in Cannes.

Reverón also had a special projection in Vallauris, in the south of France. Pablo Picasso lived and worked there, whom the director met in 1953. The success of the film and the excellent comments about it aroused great curiosity in the Spanish painter, so he organized an open-air screening in the town square where, in addition to Picasso and Benacerraf, friends, ceramists and locals attended. This was the beginning of a creative friendship between the Spanish painter and the Venezuelan filmmaker.

Margot Benacerraf's film debut with this film was of great relevance. It not only gave the figure of Armando Reverón the respect, recognition and projection, but also favored the link between the filmmaker and key figures of the European cultural world such as Henri Langlois, director of the Cinémathèque française, and the achievement of support for the development of future film projects in Venezuela, such as the creation of the National Cinematheque, among others.

== Awards ==
First International Art Film Festival

Year	Category	Movie	Result
1952	Best Art Documentary Award	Reverón	

Venezuelan Film Press

Year	Category	Movie	Result
1953	Best Venezuelan Film Award	Reverón	
