= Fernando Birri =

Argentine film maker and theorist (1925–2017)

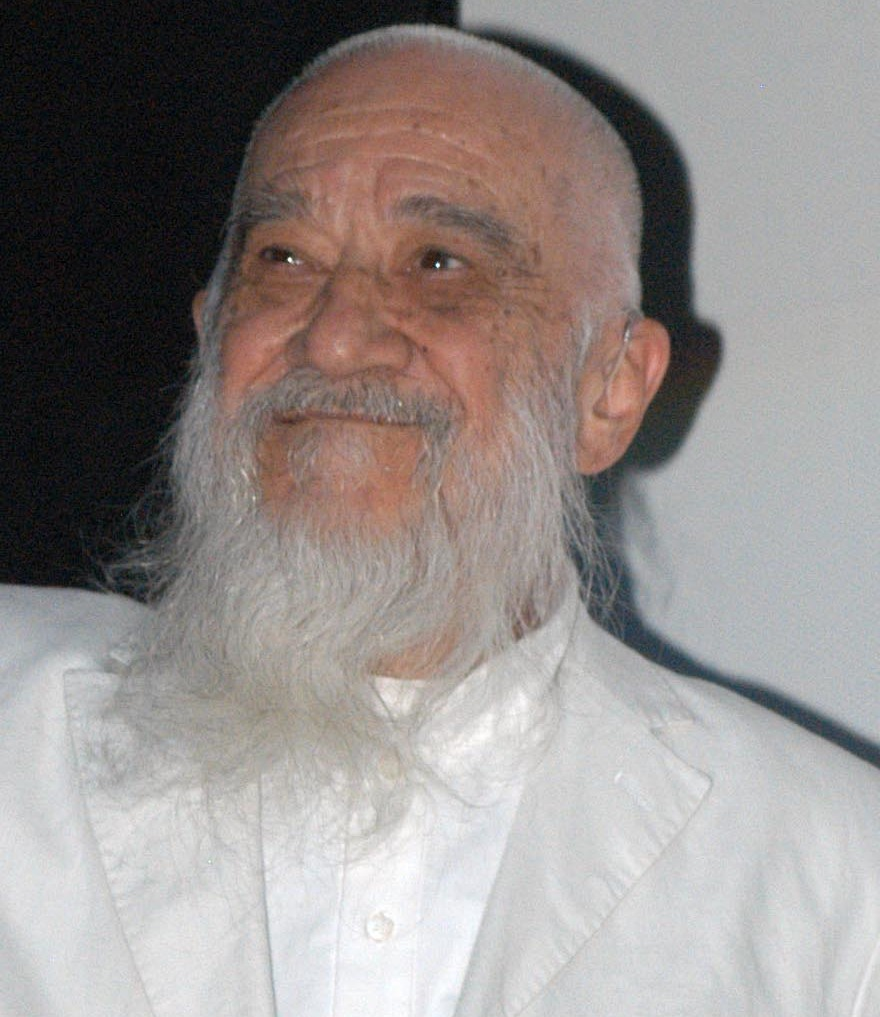
Fernando Birri, March 2008

Fernando Birri (March 13, 1925 – December 27, 2017) was an Argentine film maker and theorist. He was considered by many to be the father of the new Latin American cinema.

== Biography ==
Birri was born in Santa Fe, Argentina. After being involved in theater and poetry, he went to Rome to study film-making at the Centro Sperimentale di Cinematografia, from 1950 to 1953, and appeared in the 1955 Italian film Gli Sbandati. In 1956 he returned to Santa Fe, to form the Film Institute at the Universidad Nacional del Litoral university. A year later he started filming scenes of poverty and human misery in lower-class Santa Fe. The project, billed as a "survey film", spanned three years, and filming wrapped up in 1958. Before screening the resulting 33-minute documentary, Toss Me a Dime, Birri debuted with a short film called La primera fundación de Buenos Aires, which premiered in the 1959 Cannes Film Festival, earning Birri critical acclaim and paving his way for further projects of similar nature, like Buenos Días, Buenos Aires (1960) and more famously Los inundados (1961), which won the Venice Film Festival award for Best First Film.

After directing a short film about La Pampa Gringa (La pampa gringa) in 1963, Birri retired from directing and only returned 12 years later to make a movie about Ernesto "Che" Guevara (Mi hijo el Che) in 1985. His next film, also about El Che, was filmed in 1997 (Che, ¿muerte de una utopía?), but remained commercially unreleased. Birri has since done two more movies - El siglo del viento (1999) and ZA 05. Lo viejo y lo nuevo (2006).

In 1986 Birri co-founded Escuela Internacional de Cine y Television (The International School of Film and Television), in San Antonio de Los Baños, Cuba. He was the school's first director. In fall 2009, Birri was a visiting professor at Tufts University in Medford, Massachusetts.

Birri may hold the record for the longest title of a motion picture ever, for his first film, the short (41 minutes) released at the 1959 Cannes film festival, Vera historia de la primera fundación de Buenos Aires como también de varias navegaciones de muchas partes desconocidas, islas de reinos, también de muchos peligros, peleas y escaramuzas, tanto por tierra como por mar, que nunca han sido descriptos en otras historias o crónicas, extraídos del libro 'Viajes al río de La Plata', original del soldado alemán Ulrico Schmidl, miembro de la expedición capitaneada por don Pedro de Mendoza, quien publicó por primera vez estas memorias, bien anotadas para utilidad pública en la ciudad de Francfort el año 1567. It is usually referred to as La primera fundación de Buenos Aires.

== Filmography ==
As writer and director:

- El Fausto Criollo (2011)
- Elegia Fruilana (2007)
- ZA 05. Lo viejo y lo nuevo (2006)
- El siglo del viento (1999)
- Che, ¿muerte de una utopía? (unreleased commercially - 1997)
- A Very Old Man with Enormous Wings (1988)
- Mi hijo el Che (1985)
- ORG (1979)
- La pampa gringa (short film - 1963)
- Flooded Out (1961)
- Buenos días, Buenos Aires (short film - 1960)
- Toss Me a Dime (medium length film - 1960)
- La primera fundación de Buenos Aires (short film - 1959)

== Bibliography ==
- De Pascale Goffredo, Fernando Birri L'Altramerica, Le Pleiadi, Napoli, 1994
- De Pascale Goffredo, Fernando Birri ein fahrender Cineast, Henschel Verlag, Berlin, 1995
