= João Mendes (director) =

Portuguese film director

- Born: 18 June 1919; Lisbon, Portugal
- Died: 28 August 1997 (aged 78); Lisbon, Portugal
- Occupation: Film director
- Years active: 1944-1982

João Mendes (18 June 1919 – 28 August 1997) was a Portuguese film director. He directed 33 films between 1944 and 1982.

== Selected filmography ==
- Portuguese Rhapsody (1959) - Entered into the 1959 Cannes Film Festival.
