= 1959 Cannes Film Festival =

- Official poster of the 12th Cannes Film Festival, an original illustration by Jouineau Bourduge.
- Opening film: The 400 Blows
- Closing film: The Diary of Anne Frank
- Location: Cannes, France
- Founded: 1946
- Awards: Palme d'Or: Black Orpheus
- No. of films: 29 (In Competition)
- Festival date: 30 April 1959 – 15 May 1959
- Website: festival-cannes.com/en

Cannes Film Festival
- 1960 1958

The 12th Cannes Film Festival took place from 30 April to 15 May 1959. French writer Marcel Achard served as Jury President for the main competition. The Palme d'Or went to the Black Orpheus by Marcel Camus.

In 1959, the Marché du Film (lit. Film Market) was established as the business counterpart of the Cannes Film Festival, with the aim of helping meet the needs of film industry professionals. Before this year the market was held unofficially in the cinemas of the rue d'Antibes in Cannes. Another important development of that year for the Festival was that the French cinema moved away from the Ministry of Industry and became part of Ministry of Cultural Affairs.

The festival opened with The 400 Blows by François Truffaut, and closed with The Diary of Anne Frank by George Stevens.

== Juries ==
=== Main Competition ===
- Marcel Achard, French writer - Jury President
- Antoni Bohdziewicz, Polish filmmaker
- Michael Cacoyannis, Greek filmmaker
- Carlos Cuenca, Spanish
- Pierre Daninos, French writer
- Julien Duvivier, French filmmaker
- Max Favalelli, French
- Gene Kelly, American actor and filmmaker
- Carlo Ponti, Italian producer
- Micheline Presle, French actress
- Sergei Vasilyev, Soviet filmmaker

=== Short Films Competition ===
- Philippe Agostini, French cinematographer and filmmaker
- Antonín Brousil, Czechoslovak
- Paula Talaskivi, Finnish
- Jean Vivie, French CST official
- Véra Volmane, French journalist

== Official Selection ==
=== In Competition ===
The following feature films competed for the Palme d'Or:

English title	Original title	Director(s)	Production country
The 400 Blows (opening film)	Les Quatre Cents Coups	François Truffaut	France
Araya		Margot Benacerraf	Venezuela
Arms and the Man	Helden	Franz Peter Wirth	West Germany
Black Orpheus	Orfeu Negro	Marcel Camus	France, Brazil, Italy
Bloody Twilight	Matomeno iliovasilemma	Andreas Labrinos	Greece
Compulsion		Richard Fleischer	United States
Court Martial	Kriegsgericht	Kurt Meisel	West Germany
Desire	Touha	Vojtěch Jasný	Czechoslovakia
The Diary of Anne Frank (closing film)		George Stevens	United States
Édes Anna		Zoltán Fábri	Hungary
Eva	Die Halbzarte	Rolf Thiele	Austria
Fanfare		Bert Haanstra	Netherlands
Hiroshima mon amour		Alain Resnais	France, Japan
A Home for Tanya	Отчий дом	Lev Kulidzhanov	Soviet Union
Honeymoon	Luna de Miel	Michael Powell	United Kingdom, Spain
Lajwanti		Narendra Suri	India
Middle of the Night		Delbert Mann	United States
A Midsummer Night's Dream	Sen noci svatojánské	Jiří Trnka	Czechoslovakia
Miss April	Fröken April	Göran Gentele	Sweden
Nazarín		Luis Buñuel	Mexico
Policarpo	Policarpo, ufficiale di scrittura	Mario Soldati	Italy
Portuguese Rhapsody	Rapsódia Portuguesa	João Mendes	Portugal
Room at the Top		Jack Clayton	United Kingdom
The Sinner	蕩婦與聖女	Shen Tien	Taiwan
The Snowy Heron	白鷺	Teinosuke Kinugasa	Japan
The Soldiers of Pancho Villa	La Cucaracha	Ismael Rodríguez	Mexico
Stars	Sterne	Konrad Wolf	East Germany, Bulgaria
Sugar Harvest	Zafra	Lucas Demare	Argentina
Train Without a Timetable	Vlak bez voznog reda	Veljko Bulajić	Yugoslavia

=== Short Films Competition ===
The following short films competed for the Short Film Palme d'Or:

- A Telhetetlen mehecske by Gyula Macskássy
- Cinématographier or Préhistoire du cinema by Emile Degelin
- Corrida interdite by Denys Colomb Daunant
- Deca sa granice by Purisa Djordjevic
- Eine Stadt feiert Geburtstag by Ferdinand Khittl
- Espana 1.800 by Jesús Fernández Santos
- Fartsfeber by Finn Carlsby
- Histoire d'un poisson rouge by Edmond Sechan
- Hsi yu chi by Tei Yang
- La mer et les jours by Alain Kaminker, Raymond Vogel
- La primera fundacion de Buenos Aires by Fernando Birri
- Le petit pecheur de la Mer de Chine by Serge Hanin
- Le Seigneur Julius by Khaled Abdul Wahab
- Ligeud ad luftvejen by Henning Carlsen
- Butterflies Don't Live Here (Motyli zde neziji) by Miro Bernat
- Neobjknovennie vstretchi by Archa Ovanessova
- New York, New York by Francis Thompson
- Paese d'America by Gian Luigi Polidoro
- Pecheurs de Sozopol by Nikolay Borovishki
- See Pakistan by W.J. Moylan
- Sinn im Sinnlosen by Bernhard Von Peithner-Lichtenfels
- Taj Mahal (short film) by Shri Mushir Ahmed
- Ten Men in a Boat by Sydney Latter
- The Fox Has Four Eyes by Jamie Uys
- The Living Stone by John Feeney
- Tussenspel bij kaarslicht by Charles Huguenot Van Der Linden
- Zmiana warty (The Changing of the Guard) by Włodzimierz Haupe

== Official Awards ==
=== Main Competition ===
- Palme d'Or: Black Orpheus by Marcel Camus
- Prix spécial du jury: Stars by Konrad Wolf
- Best Director: François Truffaut for The 400 Blows
- Best Actress: Simone Signoret for Room at the Top
- Best Actor: Dean Stockwell, Bradford Dillman and Orson Welles for Compulsion
- Best Comedy Award: Policarpo by Mario Soldati
- International Award: Nazarín by Luis Buñuel
- Special Mention: The Snowy Heron by Teinosuke Kinugasa
- Award of the best selection to Czechoslovakia:
  - Desire by Vojtěch Jasný
  - A Midsummer Night's Dream by Jiří Trnka

=== Short Films Competition ===
- Short Film Palme d'Or: Butterflies Don't Live Here by Miro Bernat
- Short film Jury Prize:
  - New York, New York by Francis Thompson
  - The Changing of the Guard by Włodzimierz Haupe
- Prix spécial du Jury: Histoire d'un poisson rouge by Edmond Sechan
- Special mention: Le petit pecheur de la Mer de Chine by Serge Hanin
- Hommage: La mer et les jours by Alain Kaminker, Raymond Vogel

== Independent Awards ==
=== FIPRESCI Prize ===
- Hiroshima mon amour by Alain Resnais
- Araya by Margot Benacerraf

=== Commission Supérieure Technique ===
- Technical Grand Prize: Honeymoon by Michael Powell

=== OCIC Award ===
- The 400 Blows by François Truffaut

== Media ==
- Institut National de l'Audiovisuel: Opening of the 1959 festival
- INA: Arrival of the celebrities in Cannes (commentary in French)
- INA: List of winners of the 1959 Festival (commentary in French)
