= Araya (film) =

1959 Venezuelan documentary film

- Film poster
- Directed by: Margot Benacerraf
- Written by: Margot Benacerraf; Pierre Seghers
- Narrated by: José Ignacio Cabrujas; Laurent Terzieff
- Cinematography: Giuseppe Nisoli
- Edited by: Pierre Jallaud
- Music by: Guy Bernard
- Distributed by: Milestone Films
- Release date: 1959 (Venezuela)
- Running time: 90 minutes
- Country: Venezuela
- Language: Spanish

Araya is a 1959 Venezuelan feature film directed by Margot Benacerraf and co-written by Benacerraf and Pierre Seghers.

== Plot ==
The film depicts the lives of labourers who extract salt from the sea off the Araya Peninsula in Venezuela. Their method for extracting salt, virtually unchanged for centuries, depends on gruelling physical labor, but provides a dependable, if meagre, living for the men and their families. The film ends with a recently built plant for mechanised salt extraction that could eliminate the community's traditional source of income.

== Filming ==
Araya was produced by a two-person crew consisting of Margot Benacerraf and her cameraman Giuseppe Nisoli. On arriving at the arid and barren landscape of the Araya peninsula on the north coast of Venezuela, Benacerraf remarked it was like "arriving on the moon". Although colour photography was available to Benacerraf and Nisoli, the decision was made to shoot in black and white, as it was deemed a more powerful way of portraying the subjects.

The soundtrack to Araya includes sounds from the sea, remixed in diverse ways including playing in reverse. Benacerraf noted that the Andalusian polo songs, rare in Venezuela, had lasted due to the extreme isolation of the Araya community.

Benacerraf has argued on several occasions that Araya is not a documentary but rather a poetic narrative, genre in which it was accepted at the Cannes Film Festival.

== Reception ==
The film was entered into the 1959 Cannes Film Festival, where it shared the Cannes International Critics Prize with Alain Resnais's Hiroshima mon amour. The audience at Cannes doubted Benacerraf's claim that the film was shot by a two-man crew, especially due to the dramatic shots from a crane. However, Benacerraf responded that they had merely made use of a vacant crane left at the mine.

In 2009, Milestone Films released Araya in North American theaters for the first time as well as rereleasing it internationally. Milestone also distributes a restored DVD version of the film.
