= Toss Me a Dime =

- Spanish: Tire dié
- Directed by: Fernando Birri
- Written by: Fernando Birri; 7 other writers
- Produced by: Edgardo Pallero
- Cinematography: Oscar Kopp; Enrique Urteaga
- Edited by: Antonio Ripoll
- Release date: 1960
- Running time: 33 minutes
- Country: Argentina
- Language: Spanish

Toss Me a Dime (Spanish: Tire dié) is a 1960 Argentine documentary directed by Fernando Birri and written Birri and seven other writers. The short film, billed as a "survey film", chronicles the harsh life of lower-class slums in Santa Fe, Argentina.

In 2022, it was selected as the 24th greatest film of Argentine cinema in a poll organized in 2022 by the specialized magazines La vida útil, Taipei and La tierra quema, which was presented at the Mar del Plata International Film Festival.

== Production history ==
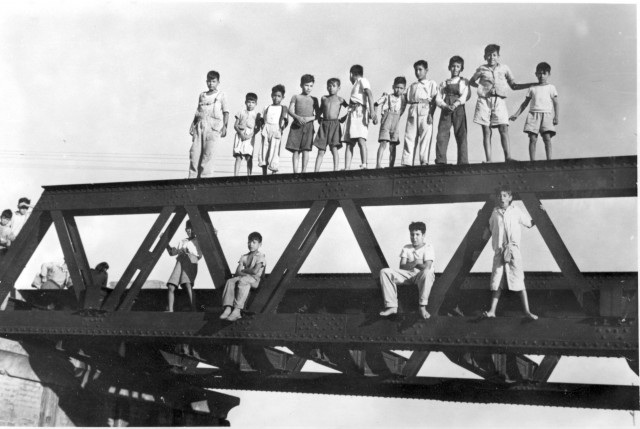
The children portrayed in the film.

Fernando Birri, born in Santa Fe in 1925, left at the age of 25 for Rome to study film-making at the Centro Sperimentale di Cinematografia, from 1950 to 1953. In 1956 he returned to Santa Fe, to form the Film Institute at the Universidad Nacional del Litoral university, and started filming footage for his project, Tire dié, over a three-year period.

The short film, with a documentary-like approach, is a genuine look into impoverished realities of Argentina in the 1950s. Not definitive in nature, but provides something more valuable – a physical cinematic look into the perspective of a man living what the film portrays. This primary source perspective is invaluable work to study 1950s Argentina. The title, tire dié is a homonym of the phrase tire diez ("throw ten [cents]"). Every day, the children would run along the sides of the moving trains shouting "Tire dié". In response, some passengers laughed, while others just observed, and occasionally one would "throw a dime". The film also interviews a number of adults, whose voices are dubbed by professional actors.

The film was released two years after its completion in 1958, which gave time for Birri to film and screen what became his first film, La primera fundación de Buenos Aires in 1959. A year later, Tire dié was premiered. The film earned Birri critical acclaim and paved his way for further projects of similar nature, like Buenos Aires, Buenos Aires (1960) and more famously Los inundados (1961), which won the Venice Film Festival award for Best First Film.
