= One Way or Another (film) =

- Spanish: De cierta manera
- Directed by: Sara Gómez
- Written by: Sara Gómez; Tomás Gutiérrez Alea; Julio García-Espinosa; Tomás González Pérez
- Starring: Mario Balmaseda; Yolanda Cuellar
- Cinematography: Luis García
- Edited by: Juan Varona
- Music by: Sergio Vitier
- Production company: Instituto Cubano del Arte e Industria Cinematográficos
- Distributed by: Tricontinental Film Center
- Release date: 1977
- Running time: 78 minutes
- Country: Cuba
- Languages: Spanish; English

One Way or Another (De cierta manera) is a 1977 Cuban romantic drama film. Directed by Sara Gómez, the film mixes documentary-style footage with a fictional story that looks at the poor neighborhoods of Havana shortly after the Cuban Revolution of 1959. The film illustrates the history before the background of the development process in Cuba. It demonstrates how tearing down slums and building modern settlements does not immediately change the culture of the inhabitants.

Gómez completed filming with leading actors Mario Balmaseda and Yolanda Cuellar just before her death in June 1974 during the film's post-production. Final work was initially credited to Tomás Gutiérrez Alea and Julio García-Espinosa before its posthumous release in 1977. Later, in 2021, however, editor Iván Arocha said he and cinematographer Luis García concluded the film following her initial plan.

It was digitally restored by Arsenal Filminstitut in 2021.

== Plot ==
Yolanda, a female teacher, cannot find the best methods to teach the marginalized children of the Havana slums because of their different origins. Mario, a worker in a bus factory and a typical macho man, is confronted by Yolanda's instinct for emancipation. The two nonetheless become lovers. Their relationship portrays the idea that racism, sexism, and class-based prejudices must be demolished in order to succeed.

== See also ==
- Social realism
