= Margot Benacerraf =

Venezuelan film director (1926–2024)

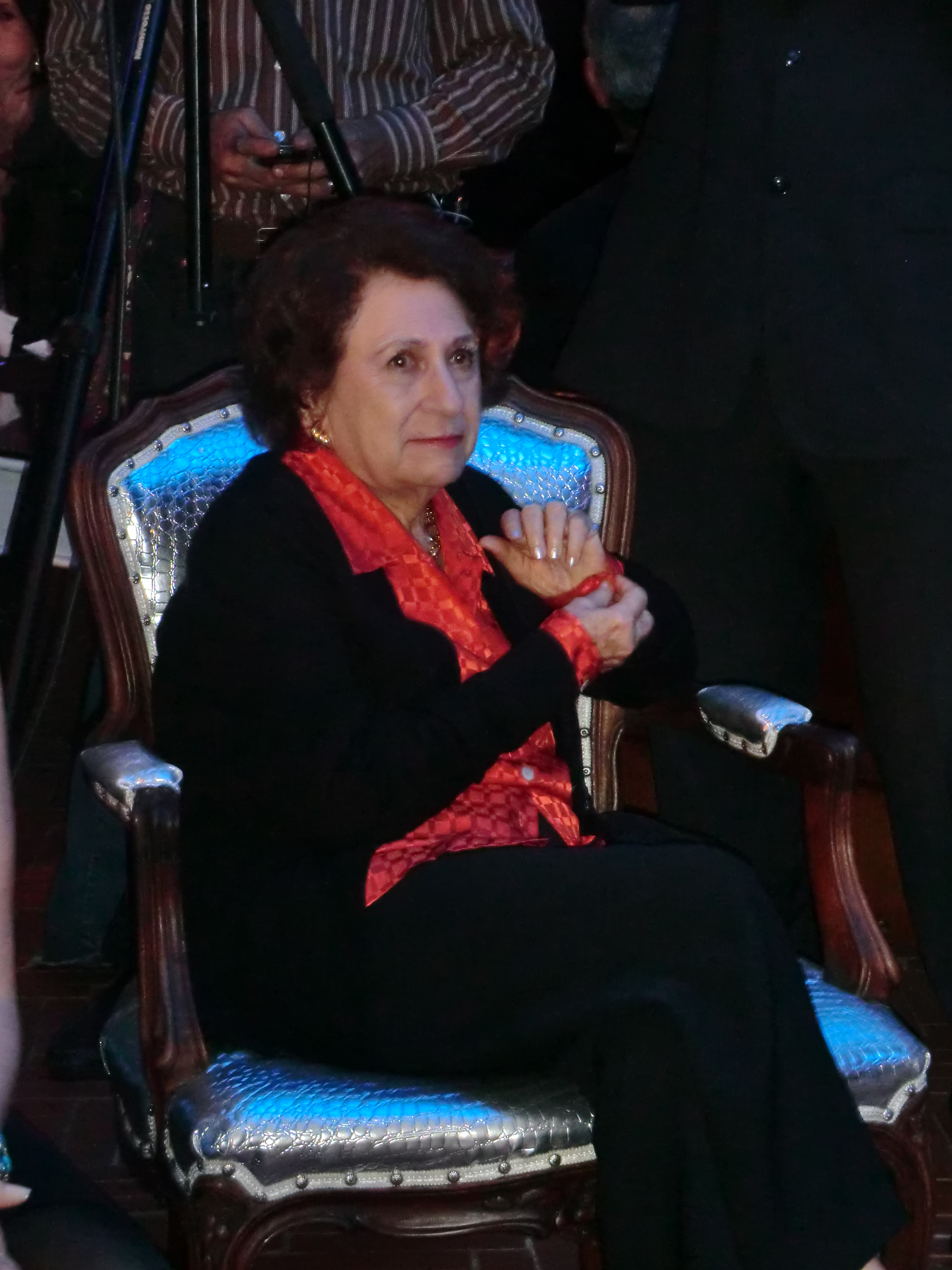
- Benacerraf in 2012
- Born: Margot Benacerraf; 14 August 1926; Caracas, Venezuela
- Died: 29 May 2024 (aged 97); Caracas, Venezuela
- Occupation: Film director

Margot Benacerraf (14 August 1926 – 29 May 2024) was a Venezuelan film director. She studied at the Institut des hautes études cinématographiques (Institute for Advanced Cinematographic Studies, IDHEC) in Paris and is best known for her 1959 award-winning film Araya.

== Life and career ==
Margot Benacerraf was born on 14 August 1926 to Moroccan Jewish immigrants in Caracas. After her graduation in literature and philosophy from the Central University of Venezuela in 1947, she won a scholarship to further her studies at Columbia University School of the Arts in New York City for three months. She then moved to France for specialized studies in cinema at the Institut des hautes études cinématographiques in Paris.

Benacerraf's two best known films, the 1950s documentaries Reverón and Araya, are considered "landmarks of Latin America narrative non-fiction". Reverón illustrates the life of the well-known Venezuelan painter Armando Reverón, and Araya portrays the day-to-day work of the workers of the salt mines of Araya, a village in the east of Venezuela. It was entered into the 1959 Cannes Film Festival, where it shared the Cannes International Critics Prize with Alain Resnais's Hiroshima mon amour.

Benacerraf founded the Cinemateca Nacional de Venezuela in 1966 and was its director for three years consecutively. She was a member of the board of directors of Caracas Athenaeum, and in 1991, with the help of the writer and patron of the Latin American cinema Gabriel García Márquez, created Latin Fundavisual, the foundation in charge of promoting Latin American audiovisual art in Venezuela.

Benacarraf died in Caracas on 29 May 2024, at the age of 97.

== Awards ==
Benacarraf received several decorations, among them the Venezuelan National Prize of Cinema (1995), the Order Andrés Bello twice, the Order Simón Bolivar, Order of the Italian Government, Bernardo O'Higgins Order of the Government of Chile, among others. In February 1987, Ateneo de Caracas inaugurated a movie theater named after her. In 2019, the Venezuelan American Endowment for the Arts awarded Benacerraf the Paez Medal of Art 2019 for her life work.

== Select filmography ==
- Reverón (1952)
- Araya (1959)
