= Julio García Espinosa =

Cuban film director

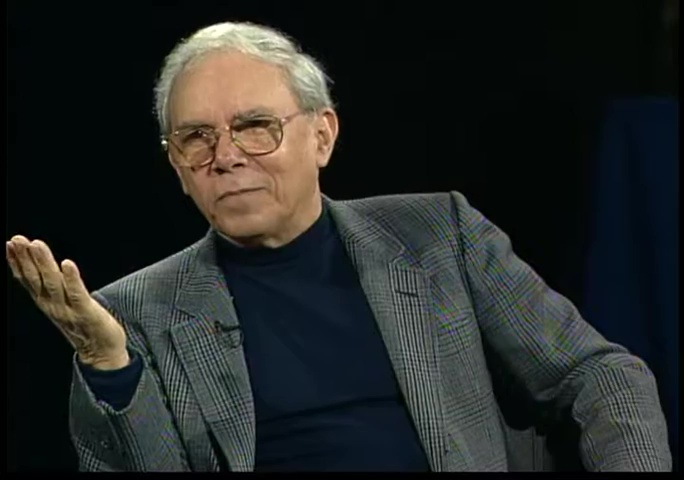
- Espinosa on CUNY TV's Charlando con Cervantes, 1995
- Born: 5 September 1926; Havana, Cuba
- Died: 13 April 2016 (aged 89)
- Occupations: Film director Screenwriter
- Years active: 1955–2006

Julio García Espinosa (5 September 1926 – 13 April 2016) was a Cuban film director and screenwriter. He directed fourteen films between 1955 and 1998. His 1967 film The Adventures of Juan Quin Quin was entered into the 5th Moscow International Film Festival.

== Selected filmography ==
- El Mégano (1955)
- Sexto Aniversario (1959)
- La Vivienda (1959)
- Cuba baila (1959)
- Patria o Muerte (1959)
- Un año de libertad (1959)
- El joven rebelde (1962)
- The Adventures of Juan Quin Quin (1967)
- Tercer mundo, tercera guerra mundial (1970)
- De Cierta Manera (1974)
- The Other Francisco (1975)
- La sexta parte del mundo (1977)
- Son... o no son (1980)
- La inútil muerte de mi socio Manolo (1989)
- El plano (1993)
- Reina y Rey (1994)
