= List of Spanish films of 2006 =

A list of Spanish-produced and co-produced feature films released in Spain in 2006. When applicable, the domestic theatrical release date is favoured.

== Films ==
Release		Title (Domestic title)	Cast & Crew	Ref.
J A N U A R Y	5	Life and Color (Vida y color)	Director: Santiago Tabernero Cast: Junio Valverde, Silvia Abascal, Miguel Ángel Silvestre, Carmen Machi, Joan Dalmau, Nadia de Santiago, Andrés Lima	
J A N U A R Y	13	My Quick Way Out (Volando voy)	Director: Miguel Albaladejo Cast: Borja Navas, Fernando Tejero, Mariola Fuentes, Àlex Casanovas, Mar Regueras, José Luis García Pérez	
J A N U A R Y	27	Blessed by Fire (Iluminados por el fuego)	Director: Tristán Bauer Cast: Gastón Pauls	(Note: Co-production Spain–Argentina (25%–75%).)
F E B R U A R Y	3	Una rosa de Francia	Director: Manuel Gutiérrez Aragón Cast: Jorge Perugorría, Álex González, Broselianda Hernández, Ana Celia de Armas	(Note: Co-production Spain–Cuba (80%–20%).)
F E B R U A R Y	10	Wounded Animals (Animales heridos)	Director: Ventura Pons Cast: José Coronado, Aitana Sánchez-Gijón	
F E B R U A R Y	24	Melissa P.	Director: Luca Guadagnino Cast: María Valverde, Geraldine Chaplin	(Note: Co-production Spain–Italy (20%–80%).)
M A R C H	17	Volver	Director: Pedro Almodóvar Cast: Penélope Cruz, Carmen Maura, Lola Dueñas, Blanca Portillo, Yohana Cobo, Chus Lampreave	
M A R C H	17	Gisaku	Director: Baltasar Pedrosa	
M A R C H	24	Rough Winds (Los aires difíciles)	Director: Gerardo Herrero Cast: José Luis García Pérez, Cuca Escribano, Carme Elías, Pilar Castro, Roberto Enríquez, Andrés Gertrúdix, Alberto Jiménez, Antonio Dechent	
M A R C H	24	The Idiot Maiden (La dama boba)	Director: Manuel Iborra Cast: Silvia Abascal, José Coronado, Macarena Gómez, Roberto Sanmartín, Verónica Forqué, Juan Díaz, María Vázquez, Paco León, Antonio Resines	
M A R C H	31	Dark Blue Almost Black (Azuloscurocasinegro)	Director: Daniel Sánchez Arévalo Cast: Quim Gutiérrez, Marta Etura, Antonio de la Torre, Héctor Colomé, Raúl Arévalo, Eva Pallarés, Ana Wagener, Manuel Morón, Roberto Enríquez	
M A R C H	31	Madeinusa	Director: Claudia Llosa Cast: Magaly Solier, Carlos de la Torre, Yiliana Chong, Ubaldo Huamán	(Note: Co-production Spain–Peru (67%–33%).)
A P R I L	7	Welcome Home (Bienvenido a casa)	Director: David Trueba Cast: Pilar López de Ayala, Alejo Sauras, Ariadna Gil, Juan Echanove, Julián Villagrán, Jorge Sanz, Javivi Gil Valle, Concha Velasco, Juana Acosta, Carlos Larrañaga, Vicente Haro	
A P R I L	7	Tirant lo Blanc (Tirante el Blanco)	Director: Vicente Aranda Cast: Casper Zafer, Esther Nubiola, Leonor Watling, Ingrid Rubio, Rafael Amargo, Jane Asher, Charlie Cox, Sid Mitchell, Jay Benedict, Victoria Abril, Giancarlo Giannini	(Note: Co-production Spain–United Kingdom (80%–20%).)
A P R I L	21	Remake	Director: Roger Gual Cast: Juan Diego, Eusebio Poncela, Alex Brendemühl, Gustavo Salmerón, Sílvia Munt, Marta Etura, Juan Navarro, Mario Paolucci	
M A Y	5	Crossing the Border (Un franco, 14 pesetas)	Director: Carlos Iglesias Cast: Carlos Iglesias, Javier Gutiérrez, Nieve de Medina, Isabel Blanco	
M A Y	19	The Wretched Life of Juanita Narboni (La vida perra de Juanita Narboni)	Director: Farida Benlyazid Cast: Mariola Fuentes, Salima Benmoumen, Lou Doillon, Chete Lera, Mariana Cordero, Concha Cuetos, Rosario Pardo, Victoria Mora	
M A Y	26	Rosario Tijeras	Director: Emilio Maillé Cast: Flora Martínez, Unax Ugalde, Manolo Cardona	(Note: Co-production Spain–Mexico–Colombia–Brazil–France.)
J U N E	9	Love in Self Defense (Amor en defensa propia)	Director: Rafa Russo Cast: Ana Fernández, Gustavo Garzón, Andrés Gertrúdix, Manuel Morón, Ginés García Millán, Carlos Kaniowsky, Bárbara Goenaga	
J U N E	23	The Education of Fairies (La educación de las hadas)	Director: José Luis Cuerda Cast: Ricardo Darín, Irène Jacob, Bebe, Víctor Valdivia	(Note: Co-production Spain–France–Portugal–Argentina (60%–20%–10%–10%).)
J U N E	30	The Bicycle (La bicicleta)	Director: Sigfrid Monleón Cast: Pilar Bardem, Sancho Gracia, Bárbara Lennie, Javier Pereira, Alberto Ferreiro	
J U L Y	7	Los managers	Director: Fernando Guillén Cuervo Cast: Enrique Villén, Fran Perea, Paco León, Manuel Tallafé	
J U L Y	14	Tu vida en 65'	Director: Maria Ripoll Cast: Javier Pereira, Tamara Arias, Oriol Vila Marc Rodríguez, Nuria Gago, Jeff Pollack, Ivan Massagué	
A U G U S T	25	The Night of the Sunflowers (La noche de los girasoles)	Director: Jorge Sánchez-Cabezudo Cast: Carmelo Gómez, Judith Diakhate, Celso Bugallo, Manuel Morón, Mariano Alameda, Vicente Romero, Walter Vidarte, Cesáreo Estébanez	(Note: Co-production Spain–France–Portugal (65%–15%–20%).)
S E P T E M B E R	1	Alatriste	Director: Agustín Díaz Yanes Cast: Viggo Mortensen, Javier Cámara, Eduardo Noriega, Juan Echanove, Unax Ugalde, Elena Anaya, Ariadna Gil, Francesc Garrido, Blanca Portillo, Eduard Fernández, Enrico Lo Verso	
S E P T E M B E R	15	Salvador	Director: Manuel Huerga Cast: Daniel Brühl, Tristán Ulloa, Leonor Watling, Ingrid Rubio, Leonardo Sbaraglia	
S E P T E M B E R	29	Go Away from Me (Vete de mí)	Director: Víctor García León Cast: Juan Diego, Juan Diego Botto, Cristina Plazas, Rosa María Sardá, Esperanza Roy and José Sazatornil "Saza"	
S E P T E M B E R	29	The Distance (La distancia)	Director: Iñaki Dorronsoro Cast: Miguel Ángel Silvestre, José Coronado, Federico Luppi, Belén López, Lluís Homar	
S E P T E M B E R	29	Lola (Lo que sé de Lola)	Director: Javier Rebollo Cast: Michaël Abiteboul, Lola Dueñas, Carmen Machi, Lucienne Deschamps	(Note: Co-production Spain–France (50%–50%).)
O C T O B E R	6	The Borgia (Los Borgia)	Director: Antonio Hernández Cast: Lluís Homar, Sergio Peris-Mencheta, María Valverde, Paz Vega, Ángela Molina	(Note: Co-production Spain–Italy (80%–20%).)
O C T O B E R	6	Doghead (Cabeza de perro)	Director: Santiago Amodeo Cast: Juan José Ballesta, Adriana Ugarte, Julián Villagrán, Álex O'Dogherty, Juanma Lara, Ana Wagener, Jimmy Roca, Jorge Roelas	
O C T O B E R	11	Pan's Labyrinth (El laberinto del fauno)	Director: Guillermo del Toro Cast: Ivana Baquero, Maribel Verdú, Sergi López, Álex Angulo, Ariadna Gil	
O C T O B E R	20	My Name Is Juani (Yo soy la Juani)	Director: Bigas Luna Cast: Verónica Echegui, Dani Martín, Laya Martí	
O C T O B E R	27	Nobody's Perfect (Va a ser que nadie es perfecto)	Director: Joaquín Oristrell Cast: Fernando Tejero, Santi Millán, José L. García Pérez	
N O V E M B E R	10	Goya's Ghosts (Los fantasmas de Goya)	Director: Miloš Forman Cast: Javier Bardem, Natalie Portman, Stellan Skarsgård	
N O V E M B E R	10	Fiction (Ficció)	Director: Cesc Gay Cast: Eduard Fernández, Javier Cámara, Montse Germán, Carme Pla, Àgata Roca	
N O V E M B E R	10	The Birthday	Director: Eugenio Mira Cast: Corey Feldman, Jack Taylor, Erica Prior	
N O V E M B E R	17	Dementia (Trastorno)	Director: Fernando Cámara Cast: Najwa Nimri, Ingrid Rubio, Pep Munné, Cristina Higueras	
N O V E M B E R	24	Perfume: The Story of a Murderer (El perfume, historia de un asesino)	Director: Tom Tykwer Cast: Ben Whishaw, Alan Rickman, Rachel Hurd-Wood, Dustin Hoffman	(Note: Co-production Spain–Germany–France (20%–60%–20%).)
D E C E M B E R	1	Summer Rain (El camino de los ingleses)	Director: Antonio Banderas Cast: Alberto Amarilla, María Ruiz, Félix Gómez, Raúl Arévalo, Fran Perea, Marta Nieto, Mario Casas, Antonio Garrido, Antonio Zafra, Berta de la Dehesa, Víctor Pérez, Cuca Escribano, Lucio Romero, Pepa Aniorte	
D E C E M B E R	1	Isi/Disi, alto voltaje	Director: Miguel Ángel Lamata Cast: Santiago Segura, Florentino Fernández, Gran Wyoming, Kira Miró, Miguel Ángel Rodríguez, "El Sevilla"	
D E C E M B E R	22	Cándida	Director: Javier Fesser Cast: Cándida Villar	

== Box office ==
The ten highest-grossing Spanish films in 2006, by domestic box office gross revenue, are as follows:

Highest-grossing films of 2006
Rank	Title	Distributor	Admissions	Domestic gross (€)
1	Alatriste	Hispano Foxfilm	3,130,710	16,489,511.68
2	Volver	Warner Bros. Pictures	1,903,583	10,120,241.88
3	Pan's Labyrinth (El laberinto del fauno)	Warner Bros. Pictures	1,346,853	7,156,755.31
4	The Borgia (Los Borgia)	DeAPlaneta	1,244,590	6,598,611.19
5	Perfume: The Story of a Murderer (El perfume, historia de un asesino)	Filmax	1,184,849	6,499,507.51
6	The 2 Sides of the Bed (Los 2 lados de la cama) ‡	Buena Vista International	854,957	4,461,257.17
7	Nobody Is Perfect (Va ser que nadie es perfecto)	Sony Pictures	497,366	2,653,625.17
8	Salvador (Salvador Puig Antich)	Warner Bros. Pictures	481,341	2,598,866.32
9	My Name Is Juani (Yo soy la Juani)	Manga Films	433,951	2,340,311.50
10	Los managers	Filmax	401,317	2,044,113.47
‡: 2005 theatrical opening

== See also ==
- 21st Goya Awards
