= Robert Newman =

Robert Newman may refer to:

== Entertainment ==
- Robert Loftin Newman (1827–1912), American painter and stained-glass designer
- Robert Newman (impresario) (1858–1926), manager of the Queen's Hall and founder of the Promenade Concerts
- Robert Newman (actor) (born 1958), American actor, known for his long-running role on Guiding Light
- Robert Newman (comedian) (born 1964), British comedian, also known as Rob Newman
- Robert Newman (agent), Hollywood talent agent

== Politics ==
- Robert Newman (fl. 1397–1413), MP for Cricklade and Malmesbury
- Sir Robert Newman, 1st Baronet (1776–1848), British MP for Exeter, 1812–1826
- Robert Newman, 1st Baron Mamhead (1871–1945), British MP for Exeter, 1918–1931

== Sports ==
- Bob Newman (born 1938), American football player
- Rob Newman (footballer) (born 1963), English football coach
- Robert Newman (bowls) (born 1975), English bowler

== Other ==
- Robert Newman (sexton) (1752–1804), American sexton who placed lanterns for Paul Revere on his 1775 midnight ride
- Robert G. Newman (1937–2018), American physician, scientist, health manager and philanthropist
- Robert S. Newman (born 1943), anthropologist
- Robert D. Newman, American literary scholar and poet
- Robert A. Newman, American pharmacologist
- Robert B. Newman Jr., United States Air Force general
- Robert B. Newman (1917–1983), acoustical engineer and co-founder of Bolt Beranek and Newman
- Robert W. Newmann (born 1944), American painter, sculptor

== See also ==
- Robert Neumann (disambiguation)
