= List of 2003 box office number-one films in Argentina =

This is a list of films which placed number-one at the week box office in Argentina during 2003. Amounts are in American dollars.

== Number-one films ==
†	This implies the highest-grossing movie of the year.

#	Week end date	Film	Box office	Openings in the top ten
1	2 January 2003	Harry Potter and the Chamber of Secrets	$173,233	
2	9 January 2003	The Lord of the Rings: The Two Towers	$775,073	
3	16 January 2003	The Lord of the Rings: The Two Towers	$380,852	City by the Sea (#3), Spy Kids 2: The Island of Lost Dreams (#5), The Crime of Father Amaro (#8)
4	23 January 2003	Die Another Day	$312,538	L'Auberge Espagnole (#7), Help! I'm a Fish (#10)
5	30 January 2003	The Lord of the Rings: The Two Towers	$179,669	No debes estar aquí (#4), Simone (#6), 8 Mile (#8), The Wild Thornberrys Movie (#9)
6	6 February 2003	The Lord of the Rings: The Two Towers	$190,360	Analyze That (#2), The Ring (#4), The Quiet American (#7)
7	13 February 2003	About Schmidt	$177,174	Gangs of New York (#3)
8	20 February 2003	About Schmidt	$146,566	The Jungle Book 2 (#4), Adaptation (#8)
9	27 February 2003	Catch Me If You Can	$180,062	The Hours (#2)
10	6 March 2003	Catch Me If You Can	$148,429	
11	13 March 2003	Chicago	$267,080	The Pianist (#4)
12	20 March 2003	Chicago	$167,976	Two Weeks Notice (#2), The Curse of the Jade Scorpion (#4)
13	27 March 2003	Daredevil	$143,532	Punch-Drunk Love (#8), City of God (#9)
14	3 April 2003	Chicago	$181,188	Bowling for Columbine (#6)
15	10 April 2003	The Recruit	$137,347	Just Married (#4), The Core (#5)
16	17 April 2003	Final Destination 2	$104,096	Far from Heaven (#3)
17	24 April 2003	Dreamcatcher	$126,616	Maid in Manhattan (#6)
18	1 May 2003	Dreamcatcher	$66,058	
19	7 May 2003	X2	$535,801	25th Hour (#3), Irréversible (#8)
20	14 May 2003	X2	$359,980	Anger Management (#2), The Hunted (#3), Johnny English (#9)
21	21 May 2003	X2	$244,022	Bringing Down the House (#3), The Man Without a Past (#6)
22	28 May 2003	The Matrix Reloaded †	$1,351,728	Confessions of a Dangerous Mind (#4)
23	4 June 2003	The Matrix Reloaded †	$763,419	El juego de Arcibel (#6), Ararat (#10)
24	11 June 2003	The Matrix Reloaded †	$481,961	How to Lose a Guy in 10 Days (#3), Secretary (#4), Kangaroo Jack (#7)
25	18 June 2003	The Matrix Reloaded †	$354,407	El día que me amen (#2), Phone Booth (#3), Read My Lips (#9)
26	25 June 2003	The Matrix Reloaded †	$264,088	Ghost Ship (#4), Tears of the Sun (#6), Vivir Intentando (#8)
27	2 July 2003	Hulk	$407,572	Divine Intervention (#9), In the City Without Limits (#10)
28	9 July 2003	Finding Nemo	$637,594	Un día en el paraíso (#5)
29	16 July 2003	Terminator 3: Rise of the Machines	$775,474	
30	23 July 2003	Finding Nemo	$701,412	Pirates of the Caribbean: The Curse of the Black Pearl (#2), Sinbad: Legend of the Seven Seas (#6), Nowhere in Africa (#9), Spirited Away (#10)
31	30 July 2003	Finding Nemo	$832,691	Bulletproof Monk (#6)
32	6 August 2003	Pirates of the Caribbean: The Curse of the Black Pearl	$473,938	
33	13 August 2003	Pirates of the Caribbean: The Curse of the Black Pearl	$252,232	Charlie's Angels: Full Throttle (#2), Hollywood Ending (#5), Narc (#7)
34	20 August 2003	Bruce Almighty	$962,430	Cleopatra (#2), The Flower of Evil (#8)
35	27 August 2003	Bruce Almighty	$546,776	A Man Apart (#4), Dirty Pretty Things (#10)
36	3 September 2003	Bruce Almighty	$353,752	Lara Croft: Tomb Raider – The Cradle of Life (#3), Bottom of the Sea (#5), Basic (#6)
37	10 September 2003	Bruce Almighty	$304,077	Identity (#2), Zus & Zo (#8)
38	17 September 2003	The League of Extraordinary Gentlemen	$268,983	Valentín (#5)
39	24 September 2003	2 Fast 2 Furious	$186,825	Matchstick Men (#4), 800 Bullets (#9), The Adversary (#10)
40	1 October 2003	Once Upon a Time in Mexico	$126,360	Confidence (#8), Mondays in the Sun (#10)
41	8 October 2003	Bad Boys II	$131,323	Down with Love (#8)
42	15 October 2003	Freddy vs. Jason	$160,427	The Italian Job (#3), People I Know (#9)
43	22 October 2003	Freddy vs. Jason	$87,906	28 Days Later (#2), Casomai (#8)
44	29 October 2003	Freddy vs. Jason	$70,486	Femme Fatale (#3), Seabiscuit (#5), Whale Rider (#9)
45	5 November 2003	Freddy vs. Jason	$48,659	The Order (#3), The Way Home (#5), The Good Thief (#10)
46	12 November 2003	The Matrix Revolutions	$807,748	Russian Ark (#2)
47	19 November 2003	The Matrix Revolutions	$394,878	Daddy Day Care (#2), Thirteen (#10)
48	26 November 2003	The Matrix Revolutions	$254,373	Intolerable Cruelty (#2), Open Range (#10)
49	3 December 2003	Kill Bill: Volume 1	$188,471	Mystic River (#3)
50	10 December 2003	Kill Bill: Volume 1		
51	17 December 2003	Kill Bill: Volume 1		
52	24 December 2003	Kill Bill: Volume 1		
53	31 December 2003	Brother Bear	$157,162	Real Women Have Curves (#7)

== Highest-grossing films ==
Highest-grossing films of 2003
Rank	Title	Distributor	Domestic gross
1.	The Matrix Reloaded	Warner Bros.	$3,940,157
2.	Finding Nemo	Walt Disney Pictures	$3,762,513
3.	The Lord of the Rings: The Two Towers	Warner Bros.	$2,757,326
4.	Bruce Almighty	Walt Disney Pictures	$2,682,332
5.	Pirates of the Caribbean: The Curse of the Black Pearl	Walt Disney Pictures	$2,659,016
6.	Terminator 3: Rise of the Machines	Sony Pictures Releasing	$2,559,512
7.	The Matrix Revolutions	Warner Bros.	$1,828,573
8.	X2	20th Century Fox	$1,713,486
9.	Vivir Intentando	Walt Disney Pictures	$1,660,675
10.	Mystic River	Warner Bros.	$1,562,289

Highest-grossing films of 2019 by CAEC rating
ATP	Finding Nemo
ATP C/L	Valentín
SAM 13	The Lord of the Rings: The Two Towers
SAM 13 C/L	28 Days Later
SAM 13 C/R	The Matrix Reloaded
SAM 16	Mystic River
SAM 16 C/R	Gangs of New York
SAM 18	Kill Bill: Volume 1

== See also ==
- List of Argentine films of 2003
