= María Ruiz =

Maria Ruiz may refer to:

- María Jesús Ruiz, Spanish model
- María Juliana Ruiz, former First Lady of Colombia
- María Lourdes Ruiz, Nicaraguan athlete
- Maria Ruiz, character in Orange Is the New Black
- María Ruiz Cruz, Spanish actress
- María Ruiz de Burton (1832–1895), Mexican-American writer
- María Ruiz (field hockey), Spanish field hockey player
- María Ruiz (footballer), Spanish footballer
- María Ruiz Scaperlanda, Christian writer
- María Ruiz Solás (born 1970), Spanish politician
- María Teresa Ruiz, Chilean astronomer
- Teresa Ruiz (politician), born Maria Teresa Ruiz, American politician
