= Ezkio =

Town in Gipuzkoa, northern Spain

Coordinates: 43°05′N 2°16′W

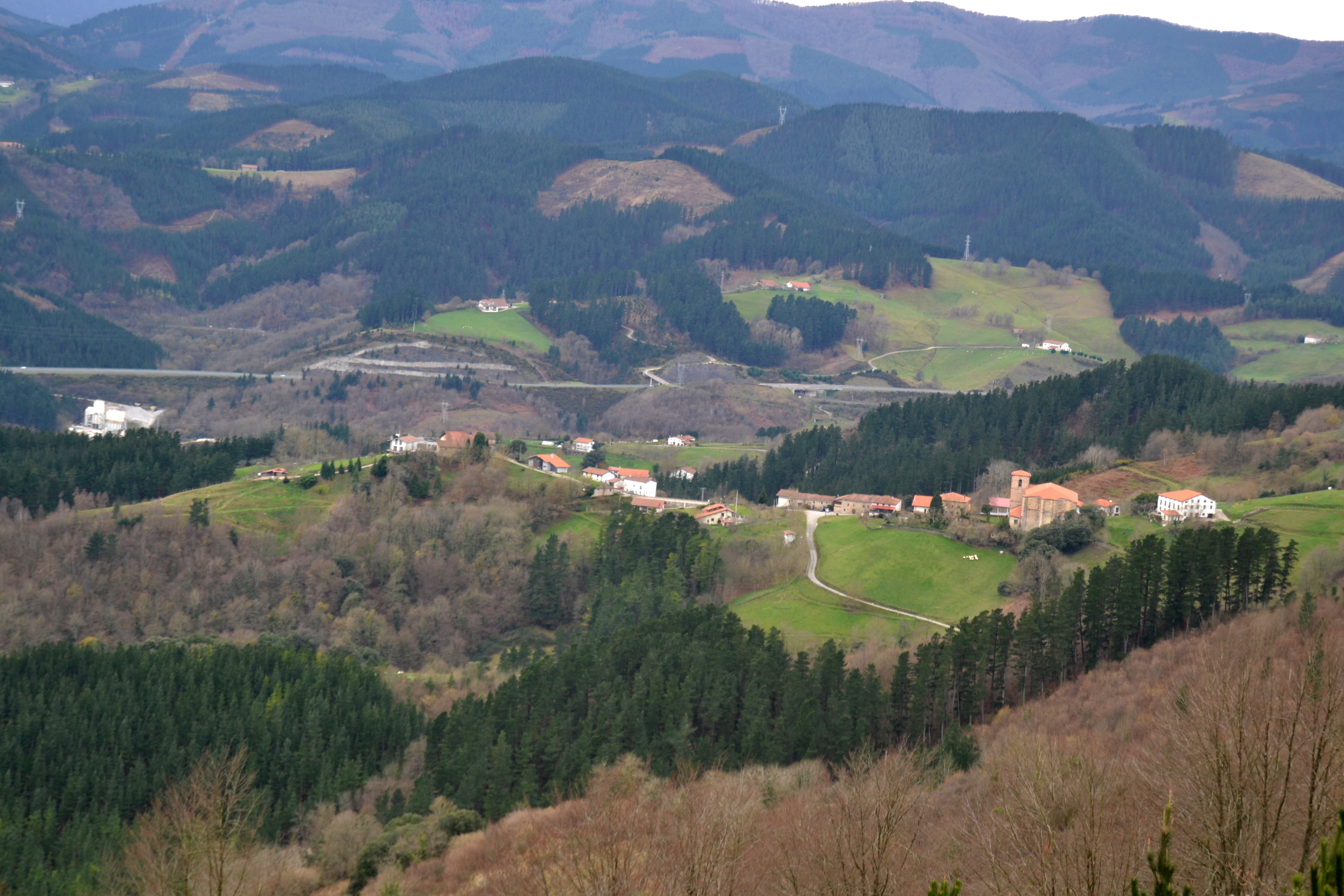
Ezkio's view from around Kizkitza, Gipuzkoa, Basque Country

Ezquioga, also called Ezkioga, now Ezkio, is a small town, part of the municipality of Ezquioga-Ichaso since 1965, now Ezkio-Itsaso, in the Spanish province of Guipúzcoa or Gipuzkoa, in the autonomous community of the Basque Country. It is most famous for alleged Marian apparitions, controversial public visions of the Virgin Mary starting in 1931.

== Location ==
Ezquioga is a dispersed farming township located at Latitude 43° 4' 60N, Longitude 2° 16' 0W, at an altitude of 555 meters above sea level, in the Goiherri region. There are no large cities nearby; Zumarraga, Spain, a nearby town, had a population of 10,265 in 2000.

== The Visions ==
=== Background ===
On April 14, 1931, the Second Spanish Republic was declared after anti-monarchist candidates won elections in urban areas throughout Spain, King Alfonso XIII of Spain abdicated. Many of the new government were Socialist or otherwise anti-clerical. However this did not spread to the religious Basque Country. In the elections on June 28, rightist coalitions won handily in Gipuzkoa and Navarra.

On April 23, 1931, children playing in Torralba de Aragón, in Huesca, saw and heard what they thought was the figure of the Virgin Mary inside the church, saying "Do not mistreat my son.". Catholic newspapers reported this vision throughout Spain. The child seers of Ezkioga allegedly read the Basque version in Argia, on May 5, 1931. On June 4, 12 girls and a boy, between 9 and 14 years old, saw an "unearthly" woman in mourning accompanied by a bright light in a church in the Basque town of Mendigorría.

=== Ezquioga visions ===
On 29 June 1931, a brother and sister of the Bereciartua family, ages 7 and 11, monolingual Basque speakers, claimed to have seen the Virgin Mary clad in a black mantle on a hillside known as Anduaga, which lay above a church and school in Ezquioga. Their own father did not believe them, but hundreds of others came to the hillside to see for themselves.

Eventually, hundreds of thousands of mostly Basque devotees came to Ezquioga expecting to witness and perhaps even experience visions, and hundreds did. On the nights of July 12, 16, and 18, and October 16, up to eighty thousand persons turned out. In the first month there were over a hundred alleged seers. Occasional visions continued until the fall of 1933. Seers described blinding light, convulsed, many fell unconscious, and some bled. In 1933, bleeding crucifixes were reported around Ezquioga, seemingly as a retort to negative reports about the visionaries.

=== Reactions ===
Many rightist Basque nationalists, preparing for a civil war against the Republic, supported the visionaries, believing the visions were a sign that the Virgin Mary supported them. It also drew a certain amount of attention among the Catholics of Catalonia. The official church, on the other hand, soon turned against the seers. At the invitation of the diocese, Jose Antonio Laburu, a Jesuit, preached against the "mental contagion" of the Ezquioga visions at San Sebastian in April and June 1932, contrasting them against the "true" visions of Teresa of Avila and Thomas Aquinas. Similarly the Republican government tried to suppress the visions. Rumor had it that the President Manuel Azaña had sent Dr Gregorio Marañón (then vacationing at San Sebastián) to investigate. In the fall of 1932, Pedro del Pozo Rodríguez, the governor of Gipuzkoa, briefly interned those who claimed to see visions at the provincial psychiatric hospital of Santa Águeda, Mondragón. The visions became a taboo subject in the region, and the visionaries went underground, meeting in small groups with loyal followers. In 1936, the Spanish Civil War came. It was not among Catholic and non-Catholics as many Ezquioga followers had expected: the Catholic Basque nationalists took the side of the Republic, while the also Catholic Navarrese Carlists took the side of the Francoist rebellion. Nevertheless, the Ezquioga visionaries keep meeting in secret and they were still doing so seventy years later.

=== Works ===
The Irish Catholic Hispanist Walter Starkie visited Ezquioga during the zenith of the apparitions and spent a whole chapter of his book Spanish Raggle-Taggle on them. He concluded quite convinced that the traditionalist and right-wing groups were using the Ezquioga events politically against the irreligious republic.

William A. Christian Jr., wrote a detailed and influential study of the event, Visionaries: The Spanish Republic and the Reign of Christ, ISBN 0-520-21948-1, published in 1996, and an updated second edition published in Spanish in 2011, translated by José Luis Gil Aristu, El Reino de Cristo en la Segunda República; un historia silenciada (Barcelona, Ariel), ISBN 978-84-344-6983-9.

A Spanish language film titled Visionarios, in 2001, directed and written by Manuel Gutiérrez Aragón, and starring Eduardo Noriega, Leire Ucha, and Ingrid Rubio dramatized the event. The plot is that Joshe, a young man from Ezkioga is torn between two women who each claim to have seen a vision of the Virgin Mary on a nearby hillside. Meanwhile, the town is overwhelmed by outsiders seeking to share or exploit the girls’ miraculous vision.

== See also ==
- Virgen de Umbe (Spanish), a similar unofficial cult based on apparitions of Our Lady of Sorrows at Umbe, a mountain location in Biscay.
