= Pancho Casal =

Spanish politician and film producer

- Francisco Casal Vidal
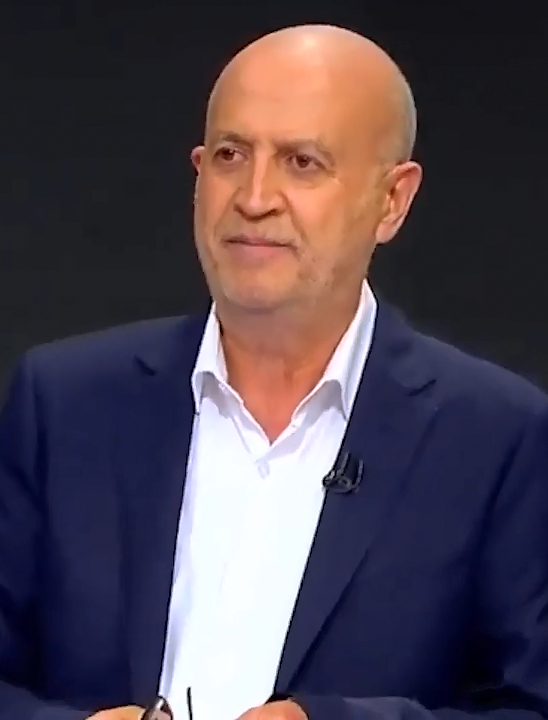
- Pancho Casal

Deputy of Parliament of Galicia
- In office 21 October 2016 – 12 July 2020

Personal details
- Born: 16 August 1955 (age 70) A Coruña, Galicia, Spain
- Party: Podemos; En Marea
- Education: Comillas Pontifical University

Pancho Casal (born Francisco Casal Vidal, 16 August 1955) is a Spanish engineer, film producer and politician.

== Biography ==
Pancho Casal was born in 1955 in A Coruña.He studied at Comillas Pontifical University and graduated at the age of 21 in 1977, as a senior engineer in the branch of Electronics. in 1978, he got the title of superior industrial engineer. After graduating, he worked as an engineer and media producer. He was the technical director of several companies and maintenance manager of Unión Fenosa's hydraulic power plants.

== Cinema career ==
He also works in the field of cinema. casal has produced several films and television shows. He has also worked as an executive producer. He was nominated for the Goya Award in 2011 and 2015.

=== Selected filmography ===
- Continental (1989) executive producer
- A familia Pita (TV Series) (1996) producer
- Frontera Sur (1998) co-producer
- Finisterre, donde termina el mundo (1998) producer
- By My Side Again (1999) associate producer
- La rosa de piedra (1999) executive producer
- I Know Who You Are (2000) producer
- The Impatient Alchemist (2002) producer
- Thirteen Chimes (2002) executive producer
- Al alcance de su mano (TV Movie) (2002) executive producer
- Joc de mentides (TV Movie) (2003) co-producer
- Aguiño, sobrevivr al prestige (Documentary) (2003) executive producer
- Your Next Life (2004) producer
- Para que no me olvides (2005) producer
- Un rey en La Habana (2005) co-producer
- Los aires difíciles (2006) producer
- Blue Days (2006) producer
- De profundis (2007) producer
- The Contestant (2007) producer
- Abrígate (2007) producer
- Una mujer invisible (2007) producer
- A Flor máis grande do mundo (Short) (2007) producer
- O gran camiño (TV Series) (2007)producer
- Animal Crisis (2007) producer
- Os Atlánticos (TV Series) (2008) producer
- Altra oportunitat (TV Series) (2008) executive producer / producer
- El espejo (TV Movie) (2008) producer
