= List of Argentine films of 2003 =

This is a list of films produced in Argentina in 2003:

Argentine films of 2003
Title	Director	Release	Genre
Abrazos, tango en Buenos Aires	Daniel Rivas		
Adiós, querida Luna	Fernando Spiner		
El agua en la boca	Federico Augusto Arzeno		
El alquimista impaciente	Patricia Ferreira		
Assassination Tango	Robert Duvall		
Barbie también puede estar triste	Albertina Carri		
Bar "El Chino"	Daniel Burak		
Bonanza (En vías de extinción)	Ulises Rosell		
Bonifacio	Rodrigo Magallanes		
C - D
Carandiru	Hector Babenco		
Che vo cachai	Laura Bondarevsky		
Ciudad del Sol	Carlos Galettini		
Cleopatra	Eduardo Mignogna		
Click!	Ricardo Berretta		
Código postal	Roberto Echegoyenberri		
El día que me amen	Daniel Barone		
Donde cae el sol	Gustavo Fontán		
E - I
En la ciudad sin límites	Antonio Hernández		
El fondo del mar	Damián Szifrón		
Gerente en dos ciudades	Diego Soffici		
Hay lo que hay: Y las antenas comunican la paranoia como hormigas	Ezequiel F.Muñoz	dlclembre	Documentary
Ilusión de movimiento	Héctor Molina		
India Pravile	Mario Sábato		
J - O
El juego de Arcibel	Alberto Lecchi		
El juego de la silla	Ana Katz		
Marc, la sucia rata	Leonardo Fabio Calderón		
La mecha	Raúl Perrone		
Mujeres en rojo	Paula Hernández, Albertina Carri, Ana Katz, Julia Solomonoff y Lucía Cedrón	28 of October	cortometrajes
Murgas y murgueros	Pedro Fernández Mouján		
Nadar solo	Ezequiel Acuña		
Nicotina	Hugo Rodríguez		
No debes estar aquí	Jacobo Rispa		
La noche de las cámaras despiertas	Hernán Andrade/ Víctor Cruz		
Nowhere	Luis Sepúlveda		
Oscar Alemán, vida con swing	Hernán Gaffet		
P - S
Plata segura			
El polaquito	Juan Carlos Desanzo		
Por la vuelta	Cristian Pauls		
Potestad	Luis César D'Angiolillo		
Raúl Barboza, el sentimiento de abrazar	Silvia Di Florio		
El regreso	Hugo Lescano		
Los rubios	Albertina Carri		
Sangre	Pablo César		
El séptimo arcángel	Juan Bautista Stagnaro		
Sé quién eres	Patricia Ferreira		
Sol de noche	Pablo Milstein/ Norberto Ludin		
Soy tu aventura	Néstor Montalbano		
Sudeste	Sergio Bellotti		
T - Z
Tan de repente	Diego Lerman		
La televisión y yo (notas en una libreta)	Andrés Di Tella		
Testosterona	David Moreton		
Todo juntos	Federico León		
Un día en el paraíso	Juan Bautista Stagnaro		
Un hijo genial	José Luis Massa		
Valentín	Alejandro Agresti		
Vivir Intentando	Tomás Yankelevich		
Vladimir en Buenos Aires	Diego Gachassin		
Yo no sé qué me han hecho tus ojos	Sergio Wolf y Lorena Muñoz		Documentary

== See also ==
- 2003 in Argentina

== External links and references ==
- Argentine films of 2003 at the Internet Movie Database
