= The Birthday (film) =

- Directed by: Eugenio Mira
- Screenplay by: Mikel Alvariño; Eugenio Mira
- Produced by: Ibon Cormenzana
- Starring: Corey Feldman; Jack Taylor; Erica Prior
- Cinematography: Unax Mendía
- Edited by: Alejo Levis
- Music by: Chucky Namanera
- Release dates: December 2004 (Sitges); 10 November 2006 (Spain)
- Country: Spain
- Language: English

The Birthday is a 2004 Spanish film directed by Eugenio Mira starring Corey Feldman, Jack Taylor, and Erica Prior. It features elements of comedy, thriller, horror, and fantasy.

== Plot ==
Set in 1987, the plot follows Norman Forrester, a guy who attends the birthday of his girlfriend's father, involving himself in a conspiracy pertaining to doomsday cults.

== Cast ==
- Corey Feldman as Norman Forrester
- Jack Taylor as Ron Fulton
- Erica Prior as Alison Fulton
- Rick Merrill as Casper Fulton
- Richard Felix as Theodore Byrne
- Dale Douma as Vicent
- Robert Long as manager

== Production ==
The screenplay was penned by Mikel Alvariño alongside Eugenio Mira. Mira also scored the film. Shooting locations included Terrassa.

== Release ==
The film premiered in the official selection of the 2004 Sitges Film Festival. Its festival run also included screenings at CineMuerte Film Festival, Fantasia International Film Festival, and Fantastic Fest. It was released theatrically in Spain on 10 November 2006. In 2021, Filmin acquired streaming rights to the film. In 2023, Jordan Peele programmed screenings of The Birthday at Film at Lincoln Center. A 4K restoration of the film was released in Alamo Drafthouse Cinemas for one-night-only in the United States on 1 October 2024. It was released in select US cities on 11 October 2024.

== See also ==
- List of Spanish films of 2006
