= Ezkio-Itsaso =

Coordinates: 43°4′55″N 2°16′27″W

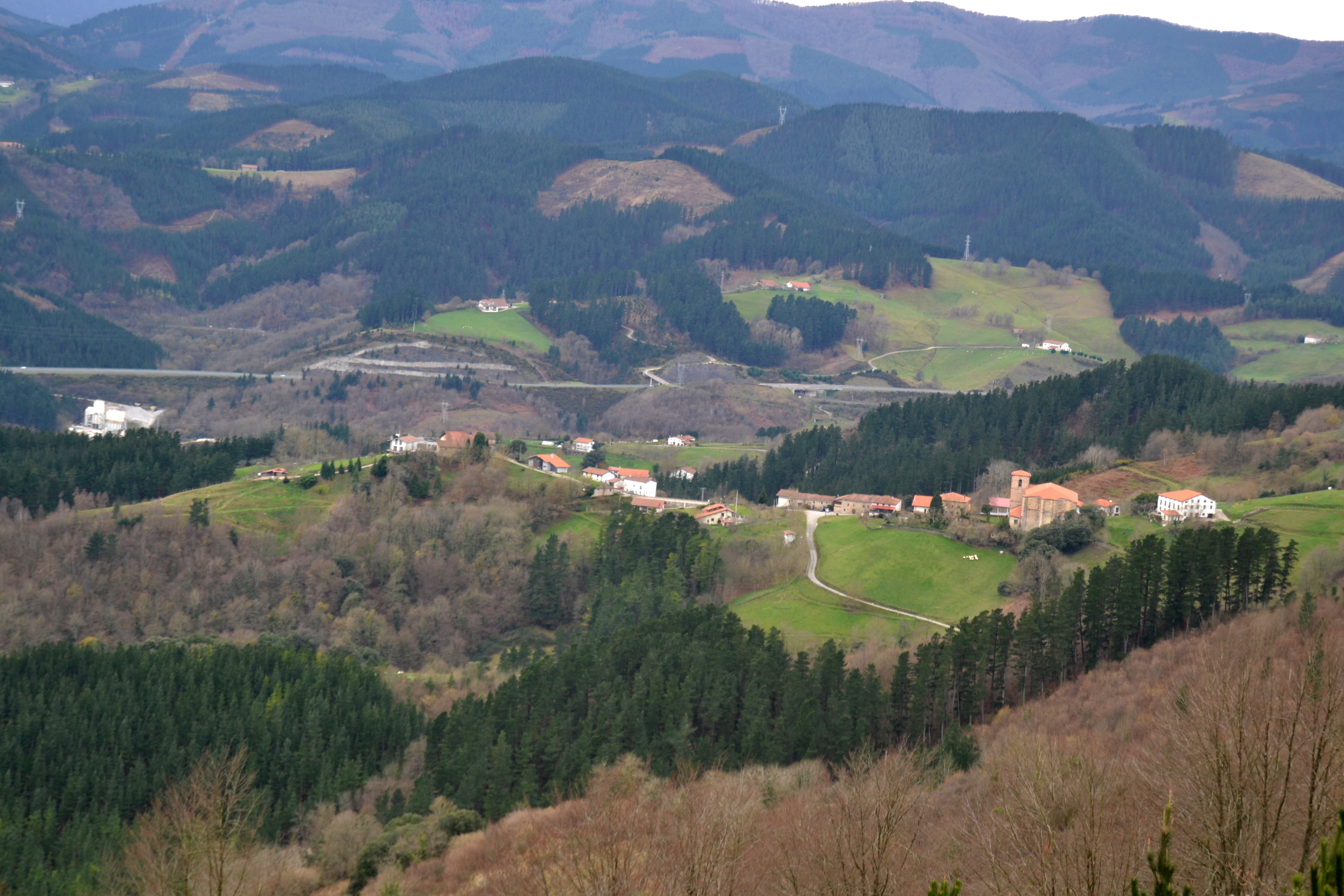
Ezkio

Ezkio-Itsaso (formerly in Spanish, Ezquioga-Ichaso) is a municipality in the province of Gipuzkoa, in the autonomous community of Basque Country, in northern Spain.

It was founded in 1965 by the fusion of the municipalities of Ezkio and Itsaso. In December 2016 the Regional Council of Gipuzkoa tried to split Ezkio-Itsaso into two independent municipalities. However, this was refused by the Spanish central government and finally dismissed by court decisions (judgments of 09/07/2018 and 09/20/2019 of the TSJ Madrid).

Ezkio was renowned in the 1930s for the apparitions of the Virgin Mary even though the Catholic Church has not authenticated them.

There is an advanced project to build an AVE high-speed train station in Ezkio-Itsaso that would become an important travel hub connecting the Basque Y to Navarre. However, a connection to Navarre from Vitoria-Gasteiz is also studied.

== Politics ==
Party	Votes	%	+/-	Seats	+/-
Ezkio Eraikiz	311	90.14	▲5.60	7	0
PSE-EE (PSOE)	18	5.21	▼5.12	0	0
Ezkio Eraikiz hold					

== See also ==
- Ezkio
- Itsaso
