= Santi Millán =

Spanish actor

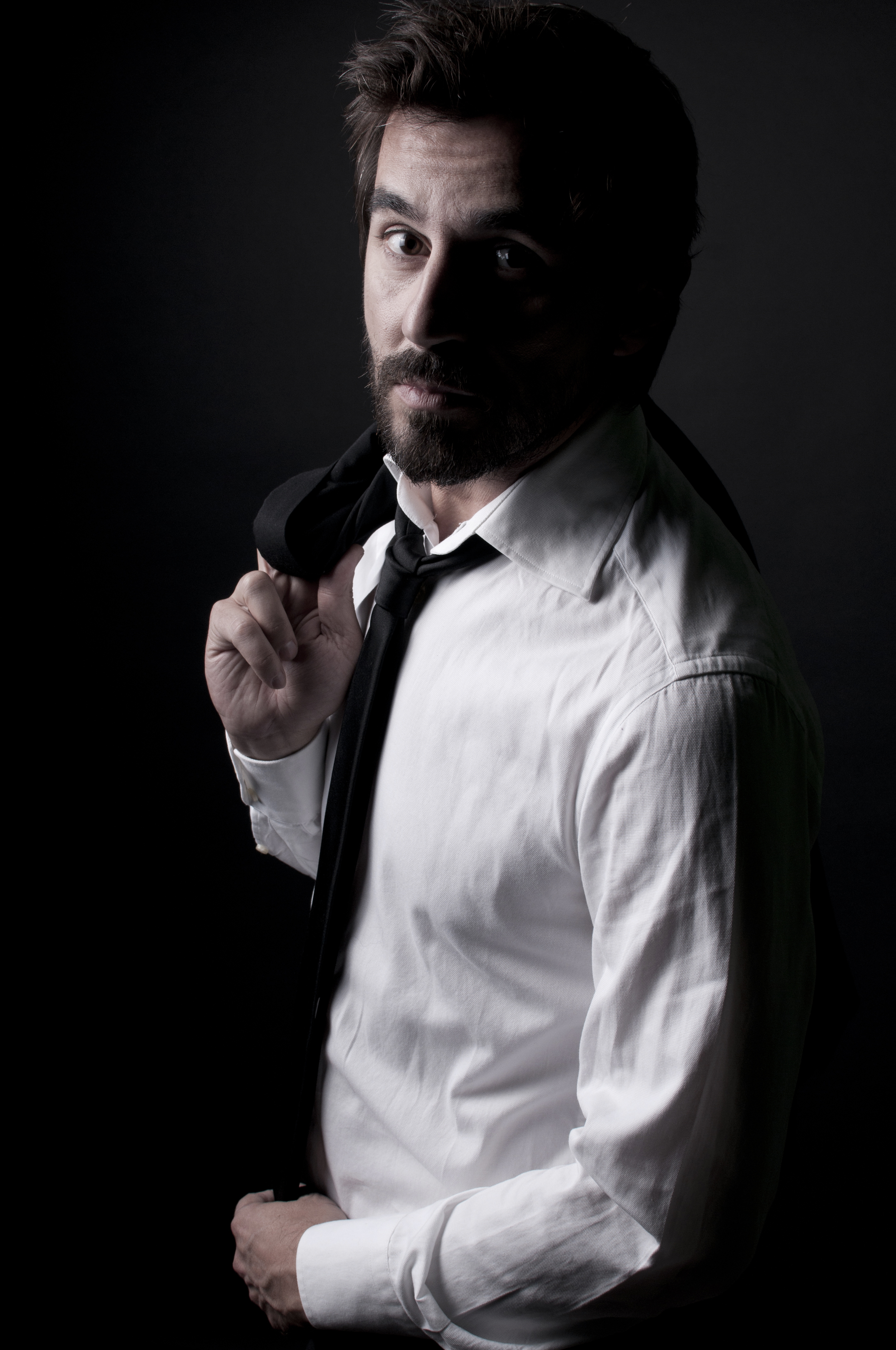
- Millán in 2010.
- Born: Santiago Millán Montes; 13 September 1968 (age 57); Barcelona, Spain
- Occupations: Actor, showman, television presenter

Santiago Millán Montes (born 13 September 1968, in Barcelona), professionally known as Santi Millán, is a Spanish actor, showman and television presenter.

== Career ==
Millán studied theatre at Colegio del Teatro in Barcelona and in 1989 he joined theatre company La Cubana. In 1999 he left La Cubana and he joined Andreu Buenafuente's late night show La Cosa Nostra on TV3, playing the role of a reporter called Paco Monteagudo. Thanks to his collaboration with Buenafuente, in January 2001 he was cast in late night show La última noche on Telecinco, cancelled after a few weeks. By the end of the year he went back to TV3 to lead along with his friend José Corbacho the improvisational comedy show A pèl. He also worked with Corbacho in his return to theatre with the play 5hombres.com. In this period, Millán was also featured in the radio show El Terrat, hosted by Andreu Buenafuente on Radio Barcelona (Cadena SER).

In 2002 Millán landed a role on national television in the series Periodistas, produced by Globomedia for Telecinco, playing photojournalist Pep. After the end of the series, Millan was hired by the same production company to play the role of Sergio Antúnez in the sitcom Siete Vidas, also aired on Telecinco. At the same time, he appeared in Catalonia on Buenafuente's new late night show Una altra cosa.

Capitalising on his television fame, he started a career in cinema: Vivancos 3 (2003), Di que sí (2004) and his first dramatic role, Amor idiota (2005), which was followed by comedy Va a ser que nadie es perfecto (2006).

In 2005 Millán collaborated with Andreu Buenafuente in the first season of his first venture on national television, Buenafuente. The next year, he produced (with El Terrat) and starred in the TV series Divinos, aired on Antena 3 and cancelled after two episodes due to poor ratings.

In 2007 he left El Terrat and created his own production company, Zoo Partners Entertainment (Zoopa). On 10 October 2007, he premiered on TV3 the first show hosted by him, Boqueria 357, which aired until March 2008. He came back with a spin-off in Summer 2008, titled Boqueria After Sun. In the same period, Millán starred in the television series LEX on Antena 3, alongside Javier Cámara and Nathalie Poza.

From April to June 2010 Millán hosted late night show UAU! on Cuatro.

In 2012 Millán starred in the drama television series Frágiles on Telecinco, and was hired by variety show El Hormiguero on Antena 3 as a new collaborator.

In 2014 the comedy television series El chiringuito de Pepe premiered on Telecinco, starred by Millán, Jesús Bonilla and Blanca Portillo. On 26 August 2015, Millán was announced as the host of Got Talent España.

== Personal life ==
In 2009 Milán married actress Rosa Olucha, with whom he has two children: Ruth and Marc.

== Filmography ==
=== Cinema ===
- El amor perjudica seriamente la salud, by Manuel Gómez Pereira (1996)
- Torrente 2: Misión en Marbella, by Santiago Segura (2000)
- Lisístrata, by Francesc Bellmunt (2002)
- Nudos, by Lluís Maria Güell (2003)
- Vivancos 3, by Albert Saguer (2003)
- Di que sí, by Juan Calvo (2004)
- Amor idiota, by Ventura Pons (2005)
- Va a ser que nadie es perfecto, by Joaquín Oristrell (2006)
- La habitación de Fermat, by Luis Piedrahita & Rodrigo Sopeña (2007)
- Rivales, by Fernando Colomo (2008)
- Bruc, el desafío, by Daniel Benmayor (2010)
- Paul, by Greg Motola (2010) (Spanish voice)
- Mil cretins, by Ventura Pons (2011)
- Any de Gracia, by Ventura Pons (2011)
- Ted, by Seth MacFarlane (2012)
- Solo para dos, by Roberto Santiago (2013)
- Ted 2, by Seth MacFarlane (2015) (Spanish voice)
- Espejo, espejo (2022)

=== Television ===
==== Programs ====
- El día por delante (TVE, 1989).
- Especial nochebuena en TVE (1989).
- Especial cap d'any "Aquest any TV3 no fa res" (1989–1990).
- El Martes que viene (TVE, 1990), actor.
- La Cosa Nostra (TV3, 1999–2000), reporter
- La última Noche (Telecinco, 2001), subdirector, actor.
- A pèl (TV3, 2001–2002), showman.
- El club de la comedia (Digital +, 2001–2005).
- Una altra cosa (TV3, 2002–2003), reporter
- A pèl tour (TV3, 2002–2003), reporter
- Buenafuente, (Antena 3, 2005) collaborator
- Boqueria 357 / Boqueria After Sun (TV3, 2007–2008), showman & director
- Gala Premios Ondas (Cuatro, 2008–2009), presenter
- Gala X1FIN: juntos por el Sáhara (Cuatro, 2009), showman & singer
- UAU!' (Cuatro, 2010), director and presenter.
- Gala Voces X1FIN: juntos por Mali (Cuatro, 2010), singer.
- El Hormiguero, Antena 3 (2012–2015), collaborator.
- Sopa de gansos, (Cuatro, 2015), sant-up comedy monologue.
- Got Talent España, (Telecinco, 2016–present), host.
- Cero en Historia, (#0, 2017).
- Got Talent: Lo mejor del mundo, (Telecinco, 2020–present)

==== Fiction ====
- Els grau (TV3, 1991), actor
- Teresines, SA (TV3, 1992), actor
- Me lo dijo Pérez (Telecinco, 1999), actor
- Periodistas (Telecinco, 2002), actor
- 7 vidas (Telecinco, 2002–2005), actor
- Divinos, (Antena 3, 2006), productor ejecutivo, actor
- Los simuladores (Cuatro, 2006), actor
- Cuestión de sexo (Cuatro, 2007), actor
- LEX (Antena 3, 2008), actor
- Frágiles, (Telecinco, 2012–2013), actor
- El chiringuito de Pepe, (Telecinco, 2014–present), actor
- El pueblo (Prime Video, 2019–), actor

=== Music videos ===
Year	Artist	Song	Ref.
2003	Estopa	"Fuente de Energía"	

=== Radio ===
- El Terrat. Estem arreglats, Radio Barcelona (2001–2002)

== Theatre ==
- Cubanas a la carta (1988)
- Cómeme el coco, negro (1989)
- Cubana Maratón dancing (1992)
- Cegada de amor (1994–1998)
- 5 Hombres.com
- Ustedes se preguntarán como he llegado hasta aquí (2001) director
- Wanted, el show de los cómicos más buscados (2007)
- Singles, de Toni Moog (2008) director
- Más Allá del Puente, by David Botello (2010) producer/actor
- Santi Millán Live! (2013–present)
