= Rough Winds =

- Theatrical release poster
- Spanish: Los aires difíciles
- Directed by: Gerardo Herrero
- Screenplay by: Ángeles González-Sinde; Alberto Macías
- Based on: Los aires difíciles by Almudena Grandes
- Produced by: Gerardo Herrero; Pancho Casal; Antonio P. Pérez
- Starring: José Luis García Pérez; Cuca Escribano; Roberto Enríquez; Alberto Jiménez; Carmen Elías; Andrés Gertrúdix; Antonio Dechent; Pilar Castro
- Cinematography: Alfredo F. Mayo
- Edited by: Carmen Frías; Berta Frías
- Music by: Lucio Godoy
- Production companies: Tornasol Films; Continental Producciones; Maestranza Films
- Distributed by: Alta Classics
- Release dates: 18 March 2006 (Málaga); 24 March 2006 (Spain)
- Country: Spain
- Language: Spanish

Rough Winds (Spanish: Los aires difíciles) is a 2006 Spanish melodrama film directed by Gerardo Herrero adapting the novel Los aires difíciles by Almudena Grandes. It features José Luis García Pérez, Cuca Escribano and Carmen Elías.

== Plot ==
After surviving a shipwreck, Juan Olmedo seeks solace and redress together with his brother Alfonso (a mentally handicapped person) and his niece Tamara in an Andalusian village in the Atlantic coast of the province of Cádiz, seeking to overcome the death of Charo (Juan's child love, wife of his brother Damián, and Juan's lover) in a traffic collision. He develops a bond and sexual relationship with the maid, the lively Maribel, while Panrico (Maribel's former partner) and Sara (Juan's neighbor and Maribel's friend) stay aloof.

== Cast ==
- José Luis García Pérez as Juan
- Cuca Escribano as Maribel
- Carmen Elías as Sara
- Roberto Enríquez as Damián
- Antonio Dechent as Panrico
- Andrés Gertrúdix as Alfonso
- Pilar Castro as Charo
- Alberto Jiménez
- Natalia Sánchez as Charo (child)

== Production ==
An adaptation of the novel Los aires difíciles by Almudena Grandes, the screenplay was penned by Ángeles González-Sinde and Alberto Macías. The film is a Tornasol Films, Continental Producciones and Maestranza Films production. Shooting locations included Zahara de los Atunes, Barbate and Madrid.

== Release ==
The film was presented at the 9th Málaga Film Festival, screened as part of the festival's main competition. Distributed by Alta Classics, the film was theatrically released in Spain on 24 March 2006.

== Reception ==
Fernando Méndez-Leite of Fotogramas scored a 4 out 5 stars rating, underscoring Rough Winds to be a film "for fans of character-driven and sentimental films", drawing out the design and the performance by Carmen Elías as the best thing about the film.

Jonathan Holland of Variety presented the film as "skillfully-handled but—given its subject—passionless drama", dragged by a "bland" performance by José Luis García Pérez, otherwise highlighting Cuca Escribano's as the standout performance.

== Accolades ==
Year	Award	Category	Nominee(s)	Result	Ref.
2006	9th Málaga Film Festival		Golden Biznaga for Best Film	Won	

== See also ==
- List of Spanish films of 2006
