= Visionaries (2001 film) =

- Theatrical release poster
- Spanish: Visionarios
- Directed by: Manuel Gutiérrez Aragón
- Screenplay by: Manuel Gutiérrez Aragón
- Produced by: Imanol Uribe; Andrés Santana
- Starring: Eduardo Noriega; Ingrid Rubio; Karra Elejalde; Fernando Fernán Gómez; Emma Suárez
- Cinematography: Hans Burmann
- Edited by: José Salcedo
- Music by: Bingen Mendizábal
- Production companies: Aiete-Ariane Films; Sogecine
- Distributed by: AltaFilms
- Release dates: 21 September 2001 (Zinemaldia); 11 October 2001 (Spain)
- Country: Spain
- Language: Spanish

Visionaries (Spanish: Visionarios) is a 2001 Spanish romantic and religious drama directed and written by Manuel Gutiérrez Aragón. It stars Eduardo Noriega and Ingrid Rubio alongside Karra Elejalde, Fernando Fernán Gómez, and Emma Suárez.

== Plot ==
Featuring the backdrop of the alleged Marian apparitions that occurred during the Second Spanish Republic in the village of Ezkioga, Gipuzkoa, and the climate of integrist violence arising in reaction to secularization policies, the plot follows the doomed love story between Joshe (a wannabe teacher visiting the village in order to meet with his fiancée Edurne) and Usual, a maid working at the inn.

== Cast ==
- Eduardo Noriega as Joshe
- Ingrid Rubio as Usua
- Karra Elejalde as padre Laburu
- Fernando Fernán Gómez as Gobernador
- Emma Suárez as Carmen Molina
- Leire Ucha as Edurne
- Luis Tosar
- Aitor Mazo
- Jimmy Barnatán as Patxi
- Josu Ormaetxe
- Kike Díaz de Rada

== Production ==
The film is an Aiete-Ariane Films and Sogecine production, and it had the collaboration of ICAA, Gobierno Vasco, Canal+ and TVE. Shooting locations included the Larraun Valley.

== Release ==
Selected within the lineup of the 49th San Sebastián International Film Festival's official selection, the film premiered in September 2001. Distributed by AltaFilms, it was theatrically released in Spain on 11 October 2001.

== Reception ==
David Rooney of Variety considered that while a prestige picture (owing to the high-profile cast and polished production values), the film is limited by "its lifelessly reverential approach, lack of emotional engagement and failure of the central romance to conjure any lasting resonance".

Ángel Fernández-Santos of El País considered that despite "a powerful synthetic start" and a captivating story (sketching a "magnificent gloomy portrait of closed and sexton Spain"), the denouement does not live up to promise upon the disappearance of father Laburu from the picture and the film loses some of its initial punch.

== See also ==
- List of Spanish films of 2001
