= Nobody Is Perfect (film) =

- Spanish: Va a ser que nadie es perfecto
- Directed by: Joaquín Oristrell
- Written by: Albert Espinosa
- Produced by: Jaume Banacolocha; Joan Bas; Jaume Roures; Javier Tamarit
- Starring: Fernando Tejero; José L. García Pérez; Santi Millán
- Cinematography: Teo Delgado
- Edited by: Miguel Ángel Santamaría
- Music by: Mastretta
- Production companies: Diagonal Televisió; MediaPro; Pentagrama Films
- Release date: 27 October 2006
- Running time: 96 minutes
- Country: Spain
- Language: Spanish

Nobody Is Perfect (Spanish: Va a ser que nadie es perfecto) is a 2006 Spanish comedy film directed by Joaquín Oristrell and written by Albert Espinosa. The story follows a peculiar friendship among people with disabilities. It is a Diagonal Televisió, Mediapro, and Pentagrama Films production.

== Plot ==
Carlos (Fernando Tejero) is blind; he is about to marry his longtime girlfriend and has two friends: Rubén (Santi Millán), who is deaf, and Dani (José Luis García Pérez), who is lame. What these three friends cannot imagine is that their lives will change on the night of the bachelor party.

== Production ==
=== Screenplay ===
The director, Joaquín Oristrell, portrays—through the lens of humor—the physical and emotional challenges faced by these three characters with disabilities. The director describes his characters as "superheroes" for living their lives completely free of complexes. The screenplay was not written by him, but by Albert Espinosa; this marked the first time Oristrell directed a film based on a script written by someone else—a script he adored for its approach to disability from an insider's perspective. The screenwriter's intention was to raise societal awareness regarding disability—a goal previously achieved with the film Planta 4ª, which led to a 70% increase in visits to children with cancer.

=== Filming ===
Production was handled by Mediapro, Pentagrama Films, and Diagonal Televisión, with support from the ICO and the Spanish Ministry of Culture. Filming took place entirely in Barcelona between August 22 and October 7, 2005. Woody, the dog featured in the film, actually belonged to the actor Fernando Tejero. The dog was named in honor of director Woody Allen.

== Reception ==
=== Awards ===
The film won 2 awards at the Peñíscola Film Festival: Best Actor (the lead trio: Fernando Tejero, José Luis García Pérez, and Santi Millán) and Best Screenplay (Albert Espinosa).

Box Office

In its opening weekend, the film grossed €700,000 across 200 theaters. This came as a surprise, given that promotional efforts had been virtually non-existent; however—largely thanks to the popularity that Santi Millán and Fernando Tejero enjoyed at the time—the picture maintained a strong performance at the box office. The film ended the year with a total gross of €2,653,625.17 and 497,366 admissions, ranking as the seventh highest-grossing Spanish film of 2006.

== Cast ==
- Fernando Tejero as Carlos
- Santi Millán as Rubén
- José Luis García-Pérez as Dani
- Teresa Hurtado as Patricia
- Mercè Martínez as Yolanda
- Javier Coromina as David

== See also ==
- List of Spanish films of 2006
