= Robert Neumann =

Robert Neumann may refer to:

- Robert G. Neumann (1916–1999), American politician and ambassador
- Robert Neumann (footballer) (born 1972), retired Czech football player
- Robert Neumann (writer) (1897–1975), German and English-speaking writer.
- Robert Neumann (Australian politician), mayor of Gold Coast, Australia
- Robert Neumann (badminton), retired German badminton player, played in 1991 IBF World Championships – Men's doubles

== See also ==
- Robert Neuman, art historian
- Robert S. Neuman, American abstract painter and printmaker
- Robert Newman (disambiguation)
