= Dementia (2006 film) =

- Film poster
- Spanish: Trastorno
- Directed by: Fernando Cámara
- Screenplay by: Patxi Amezcua
- Starring: Najwa Nimri; Ingrid Rubio; Pep Munné; Juan Sanz; José Carlos Blanco; Cristina Higueras
- Cinematography: Daniel Aranyó
- Edited by: David Pinillos
- Music by: Javier Cámara
- Production company: DeAPlaneta PC
- Release date: 17 November 2006
- Country: Spain
- Language: Spanish

Dementia (Spanish: Trastorno) is a 2006 Spanish psychological thriller film directed by Fernando Cámara from a screenplay by Patxi Amezcua which stars Ingrid Rubio and Najwa Nimri.

== Plot ==
Traumatised and unhinged Elena, obsessed with becoming a mother, visits the residence of pregnant sister Natalia, living a happy life, thereby triggering a conflict.

== Cast ==
- Najwa Nimri as Natalia
- Ingrid Rubio as Elena
- Pep Munné as Jaime
- Juan Sanz as Mario
- José Carlos Blanco as Lorenzo
- Cristina Higueras as Eva

== Production ==
The screenplay was penned by Patxi Amezcua. Cámara acknowledged that the film was derivative of titles such as Single White Female, Fatal Attraction or The Hand That Rocks the Cradle. Playing the film's "good" sister against type, Najwa Nimri stated that she was "not used to playing linear roles, without psychological problems" and that she accepted the role as a challenge. The film was produced by DeAPlaneta PC with backing from TVC.

== Release ==
The film was released theatrically in Spain on 17 November 2006.

== Critical reception ==
Javier Ocaña of El País deemed the film to be "a correct intrigue around motherhood, psychic imbalance and consanguinity, which gathers references of multiple genre classics" to end up underpinning "a certainly solvent product".

== See also ==
- List of Spanish films of 2006
