= National Humanities Center =

American independent institute for advanced study in the humanities

The National Humanities Center (NHC) is an independent institute for advanced study in the humanities located in Research Triangle Park, North Carolina, United States. The NHC operates as a privately incorporated nonprofit and is not part of any university or federal agency.

The Center was planned under the auspices of the American Academy of Arts and Sciences, which saw a need for substantial support for academic research in the humanities, and began operations in 1978. The National Humanities Center is one of the ten members of the Some Institutes for Advanced Study consortium—which are modeled after the Princeton, New Jersey, Institute for Advanced Study.

== Programs ==
The National Humanities Center offers dedicated programs in support of humanities scholarship and teaching as well as a regular schedule of public events, conferences and interactive initiatives to engage the public in special topics and emerging issues.

=== Fellowship program ===
Each year, the NHC admits approximately forty fellows chosen from among hundreds of applicants from institutions in the United States and abroad representing a broad range of disciplines. In addition, a few senior scholars are invited by the Center's trustees to assume fellowships. The National Humanities Center has no permanent fellows or faculty.

NHC Fellows are given substantial support to pursue their individual research and writing projects. Interdisciplinary seminars provide fellows the opportunity to share insights and criticism. The topics of NHC Fellows' research projects vastly range year to year. Recent research projects topics include speculative fiction by and about Black women, the Armenian genocide, the history of the infodemic phenomenon, and social revolt in early twentieth-century Latin America, as well as other subjects in the fields of African American studies; East Asian studies; education studies; environmental studies; gender and sexuality studies; history; history of art and architecture; Indigenous studies; languages and literature; Latinx studies; Middle East studies; music history and musicology; philosophy; religious studies; and Slavic studies. NHC Fellows have library access at nearby Duke University, North Carolina State University, and the University of North Carolina at Chapel Hill, as well as the NHC's own reference facility.

Since 1978, the NHC has hosted over 1,500 scholars who have published over 1,700 books.

=== Selected prizes won by National Humanities Center fellows ===
- Albert J. Beveridge Award of the American Historical Association
- American Academy of Religion Book Award
- Bancroft Prize
- British Council Prize in the Humanities
- Haskins Medal of the Medieval Academy of America
- Herskovits Award of the African Studies Association
- History Book Club Main Selection
- Louis Gottschalk Prize of the American Society for Eighteenth-Century Studies
- Merle Curti Award of the Organization of American Historians
- National Book Award
- Phi Beta Kappa Christian Glauss Award
- Philip Schaff Prize of the American Society of Church History
- Prix du Rayonnement de la langue et de la littérature françaises of the Académie Française
- Pulitzer Prize
- Ralph Bunche Award of the American Political Science Association
- Robert F. Kennedy Prize
- James Russell Lowell Prize of the Modern Language Association

=== Education programs ===
The National Humanities Center is distinctive among centers for advanced study in its commitment to linking scholarship to improved teaching. Programs developed at the NHC provide teachers with new materials and instructional strategies designed to make them more effective in the classroom on a wide range of topics.

Through its AmericaInClass.org site, the NHC allows participants to learn directly from leading scholars and access an extensive archive of primary source materials – arranged in online collections and accompanied with discussion questions and instructional planning guides for classroom use. The NHC makes these materials available without charge.

TeacherServe, the NHC's online interactive curriculum enrichment service, supplements its training and primary source collections with essays by leading scholars, instructional activities, and links to online resources to enrich teachers' understanding of topics and suggest approaches for more effective classroom teaching.

Recent initiatives from the Center include projects to improve teachers' subject knowledge on Vietnam, to help teachers use digital mapping technologies in classroom instruction, and to explore the experience of military veterans through literature.

=== Outreach ===
The National Humanities Center hosts a variety of public events, both to stimulate public awareness of humanities scholarship and to address special topics. Events have included appearances by A. S. Byatt, Seymour Hersh, Michael Ignatieff, Oliver Sacks, Michael Pollan, Elaine Scarry, Wole Soyinka, Raymond Tallis, Wang Hui, and E. O. Wilson and addressed a wide variety of topics including the relationship between rock and roll and literature, humanities and the public good, and the role of the humanities in addressing climate change and environmental degradation.

The Center has also launched initiatives designed to demonstrate the value of the humanities in the lives of individuals from all walks of life and to promote a deeper understanding of, and more productive discourse around, public issues. The Center's interactive Humanities Moments project was created in partnership with the Federation of State Humanities Councils in an effort to gather, store, and share personal accounts of how the humanities illuminate and transform the lives of individuals and thereby help "reimagine the way we think and talk about the humanities." Featuring news about the humanities and highlighting perspectives from leading humanists on compelling issues, the center also launched Humanities in Action in 2018 to help scholars, teachers, students, and other citizens "connect, learn more, and get involved" encouraging visitors to become better informed about issues affecting humanities research and education as well as to better appreciate how the humanities can contribute to public debate on questions of broad concern.

== Leadership ==
Since 1978 the National Humanities Center has been led by eight directors: Charles Frankel, William Bennett, Charles Blitzer, W. Robert Connor, Geoffrey G. Harpham, Robert D. Newman, J. Porter Durham, and Blair LM Kelley.

The NHC is governed by a distinguished board of trustees from academic, business, and public life and has included a number of the leading figures in American scholarship over the past thirty years. Among these are its founders Meyer Abrams, Morton W. Bloomfield, Frederick Burkhardt, Robert F. Goheen, Steven Marcus, Henry Nash Smith, Gregory Vlastos, John Voss, and founding director Charles Frankel, historian John Hope Franklin, educator William C. Friday, and philanthropists Archie K. Davis and Stephen H. Weiss.

== See also ==
- National Humanities Medal
