= Eugenio Mira =

Spanish filmmaker and composer (born 1977)

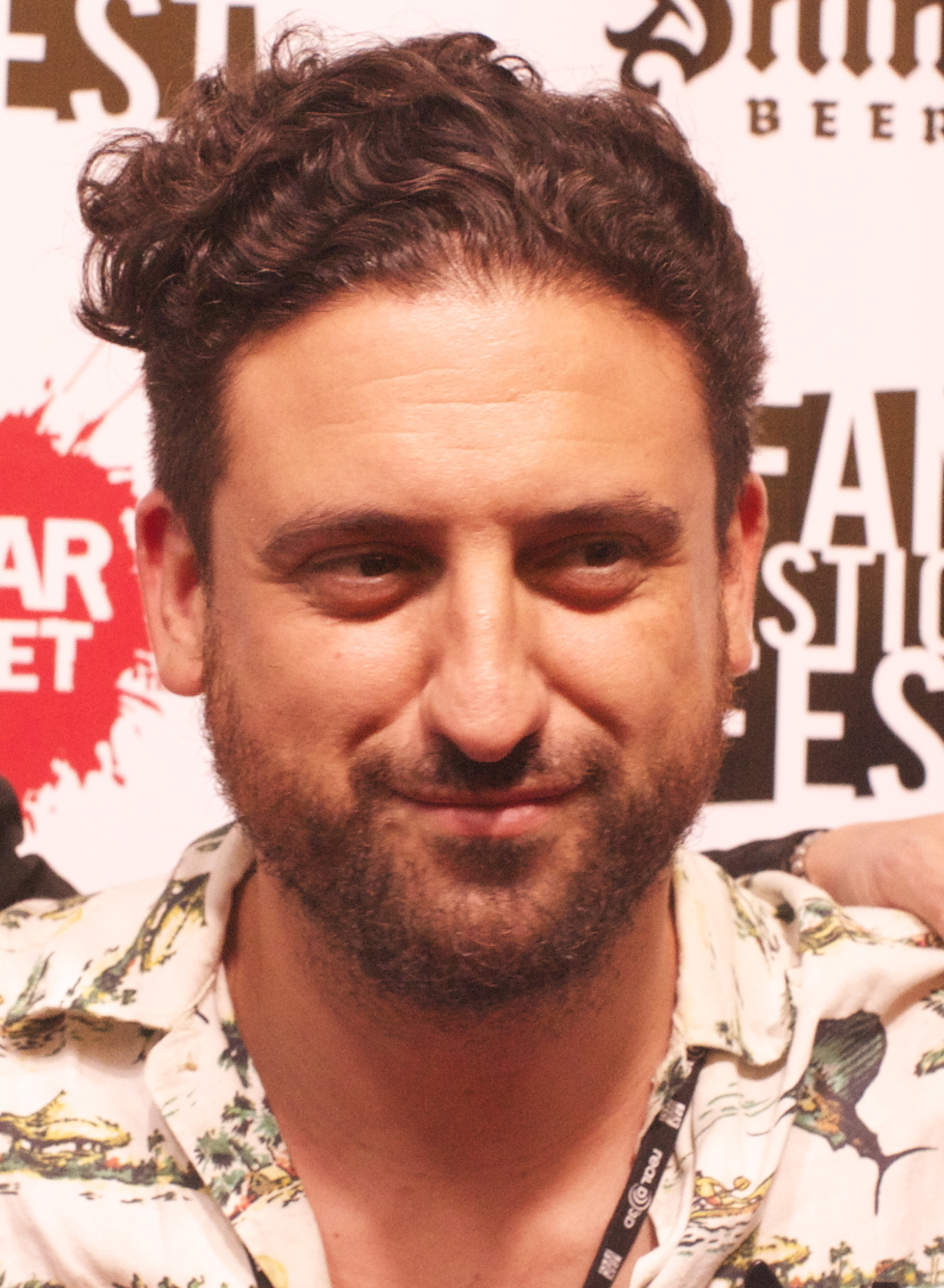
Eugenio Mira

Eugenio Mira (born 1977) is a Spanish filmmaker and composer. He has been credited as composer in some films under the pseudonym Chucky Namanera.

He was born in Castalla, Alicante. After finishing his studies in high school and as a piano player he moved to Madrid to attend Septima Ars Madrid film school, working in the Spanish film industry as a first assistant director, in the art department and the advertising world. His debut short film, Fade (2000), called the attention of Guillermo del Toro, who supported his career from the very beginning, introducing him to his agent, Robert Newman (WME).

Mira's first feature-length film, The Birthday (2004), became a cult movie after winning several awards at the first edition of Fantastic Fest (Austin, TX), where he also held the world premieres of his 2010 Gothic tale Agnosia and the 2013 film Grand Piano, starring Elijah Wood and John Cusack (released in the US by Magnet/Magnolia Pictures).

== Other works ==
Besides his work as director, screenwriter and composer, Mira has also worked occasionally at a variety of other jobs, from second unit director on The Impossible (Juan Antonio Bayona, 2012) to actor, incarnating a younger Robert De Niro in Red Lights (Rodrigo Cortés, 2011).

His soundtrack for Nacho Vigalondo’s Timecrimes (2007) was released by Mondo on a special limited edition vinyl.

Mira is currently developing several film projects and is about to release the first album from his new musical project Pagana (stylized as P ^ G ^ N ^) . This album will be the first release from Mira's own film and record label Paramirama.

He was hired to direct the 6-episode television series ¡García!, which began production in 2021 and was broadcast on HBO Max in 2022.
