= Say I Do (2004 film) =

2004 film by Juan Calvo

Di que sí
- Theatrical release poster
- Spanish: Di que sí
- Directed by: Juan Calvo
- Screenplay by: Juan Calvo
- Starring: Paz Vega; Santi Millán; Pepe Viyuela; Constantino Romero; Chus Lampreave; Santiago Segura; Ornella Muti
- Cinematography: Gonzalo Berridi
- Edited by: Javier Laffaille
- Music by: Federico Jusid
- Production companies: Columbia Films Producciones Españolas; Zebra Producciones
- Distributed by: Columbia TriStar Films de España
- Release date: 12 November 2004
- Running time: 104 minutes
- Country: Spain
- Language: Spanish

Say I Do (Spanish: Di que sí) is a 2004 Spanish screwball comedy film directed and written by Juan Calvo.

== Plot ==
Víctor Martínez is a shy 36-year-old man working as an usher at a movie theater. He still lives with his mother. By some mistake, he ends up in a reality show with Estrella Cuevas, an aspiring actress. They win the contest and are sent off to spend some time together at a luxury hotel in Oropesa del Mar. According to their contract, they have to get married and not divorce for at least three years; otherwise, the contract is annulled and they have to return their winnings of €253,000. Víctor eventually falls in love with Estrella.

== Cast ==
- Paz Vega as Estrella
- Santi Millan as Víctor
- Pepe Viyuela
- Constantino Romero as Amador Rosales
- Chus Lampreave
- Santiago Segura
- Ornella Muti

== Release ==
Distributed by Columbia TriStar, the film was theatrically released in Spain on 12 November 2004.

== See also ==
- List of Spanish films of 2004
