= I Know Who You Are (2000 film) =

- Theatrical release poster
- Spanish: Sé quién eres
- Directed by: Patricia Ferreira
- Screenplay by: Patricia Ferreira; Enrique Jiménez; Manuel Gutiérrez Aragón
- Story by: Inés París; Daniela Fejerman
- Produced by: Pancho Casal; Gerardo Herrero; Claudio Pustenlik
- Starring: Ana Fernández; Miguel Ángel Solá; Roberto Enríquez; Ingrid Rubio; Manuel Manquiña; Héctor Alterio; Mercedes Sampietro; Jordi Dauder; María Bouzas; Vicky Peña; Gonzalo Uriarte; Luis Tosar; Xavier Estévez
- Cinematography: José Luis Alcaine
- Edited by: Marcela Sáenz
- Music by: José Nieto
- Production companies: Continental Producciones; Tornasol Films; Zarlek Producciones
- Release dates: 14 February 2000 (Berlinale); 7 April 2000 (Spain); 18 December 2003 (Argentina)
- Running time: 100 minute
- Countries: Spain; Argentina
- Language: Spanish

I Know Who You Are (Spanish: Sé quién eres) is a 2000 Spanish-Argentine psychological thriller drama film directed by Patricia Ferreira which stars Ana Fernández and Miguel Ángel Solá along with Roberto Enríquez, Ingrid Rubio, and Manuel Manquiña.

== Plot ==
Just settled in Galicia, psychiatric doctor Paloma kindles with Mario, a charming patient who has developed a Korsakoff syndrome in the wake of substance abuse and some moot traumatic event occurred towards 1977 (a key year of the Spanish Transition), being unable to remember anything from that point on. She goes to great lengths to unlock Mario's repressed memories, and protect him from people chasing him. Mario is revealed to be a mercenary and hired executioner, involved in a terrorist attack against military officers investigating the army's anti-democratic pustchist plots from the inside.

== Cast ==
- Ana Fernández as Paloma
- Miguel Ángel Solá as Mario
- Roberto Enríquez as Álvaro
- Ingrid Rubio as Coro
- Manuel Manquiña as Ginés
- Héctor Alterio as General Salgado
- Mercedes Sampietro as Marisa
- Jordi Dauder as General Sánchez
- María Bouzas as Encarna
- Vicky Peña as Sarah
- Gonzalo Uriarte as Megía
- Luis Tosar as Estévez
- Xavier Estévez as Jaime
- Santi Prego as Chito
- Carlos Blanco as Casal

== Production ==
The screenplay was penned by Patricia Ferreira and Enrique Jiménez, with the collaboration of Manuel Gutiérrez Aragón, based on an original story by Inés París and Daniela Fejerman. A Spanish-Argentine co-production, the film was produced by Continental Producciones, Tornasol Films, and Zarlek Producciones.

== Release ==
The film screened in the 'Panorama' section of the 50th Berlin International Film Festival in February 2000. It was theatrically released in Spain on 7 April 2000.

== Reception ==
Ángel Fernández-Santos of El País assessed that Ferreira takes the reins of that "good script" with strength and clarity, "multiplying it" by virtue of her "remarkable filmmaking craft and instincts" and her "exquisite understanding with the actors", who nail their performances.

Derek Elley of Variety deemed Ferreira's "inauspicious feature debut" to be "a wannabe psychological thriller that just gets sillier as it progresses".

The review in La Nación gave the film a so-so rating (regular), considering that, while "being neither a bad film nor an artistic nonsense" and offering a handful of good scenes, technical values, and Ana Fernández's acting solvency notwithstanding, the film is dragged by its slips, inaccuracies and certain implausible denouements.

== Accolades ==
Year	Award	Category	Nominee(s)	Result	Ref.
2001	15th Goya Awards	Best New Director	Patricia Ferreira	Nominated	
2001	15th Goya Awards	Best Actor	Miguel Ángel Solá	Nominated	
2001	15th Goya Awards	Best Original Score	José Nieto	Won	

== See also ==
- List of Spanish films of 2000
- List of Argentine films of 2003
