= Los managers =

- Theatrical release poster
- Directed by: Fernando Guillén Cuervo
- Screenplay by: Miguel Ángel Fernández; Joaquín Gorriz; Fernando Guillén Cuervo
- Produced by: Pedro Olea; Fernando Guillén Cuervo; Álvaro Augustin; Julio Fernández
- Starring: Enrique Villén; Fran Perea; Paco León; Manuel Tallafé; Sancho Gracia; Manuel Manquiña; Celine Tyll; Lauren Postigo; María Jiménez
- Cinematography: Néstor Calvo
- Production companies: Altube & Cuervo; Estudios Picasso; Castelao Productions
- Release date: 7 July 2006
- Country: Spain
- Language: Spanish

Los managers is a 2006 Spanish comedy film directed by Fernando Guillén Cuervo. It stars Enrique Villén and Manuel Tallafé along with Fran Perea and Paco León.

== Plot ==
In order to get rich, sleazy jobless men Rena and Maca become the managers of brothers David and Pipo, moving them to Southern Spain to prepare their musical career as "Los Reyes del King", with washed up folkloric singer "La Rota" arranging a tour for them.

== Cast ==
- Enrique Villén as Maca
- Manuel Tallafé as Rena
- Fran Perea as David
- Paco León as Pipo
- María Jiménez as La Rota
- Sancho Gracia as Josete
- Celine Tyll as Irina
- Lauren Postigo as himself
- Manuel Manquiña

== Production ==
The screenplay was written by Fernando Guillén Cuervo along with Joaquín Gorriz and Miguel Ángel Fernández. The film was produced by Altube & Cuervo, Estudios Picasso, and Castelao Producciones. Filming began on 23 May 2005. Shooting locations included the Nueva Umbría beach in Lepe.

== Release ==
The film was released theatrically in Spain on 7 July 2006. It proved to be a relative success in the Spanish box office, ranking 7th in earnings for domestic films in 2006, with over 400,000 in-year admissions.

== Reception ==
Jordi Costa of Fotogramas rated the film 2 out of 5 stars, declaring it as a "wasted opportunity" with the film "burdening its occasional successes under the weight of what has been ruined".

Javier Ocaña of El País wrote that "[crafted with] eminently commercial pretensions", the product "maintains a firm sense of dignity in its first half, but falls apart when the story abandons naturalism and picaresque elements".

== See also ==
- List of Spanish films of 2006

== Bibliography ==
- Guadaño, Luis (2010). "When Thesis Films Don't Work. Representational Strategies and Immigrants in Contemporary Spanish Film" (PDF). Weber. The Contemporary West. 26 (2). Ogden, UT: Weber State University: 55–68. ISSN 0891-8899.
