= María Jiménez (singer) =

Spanish singer (1950–2023)

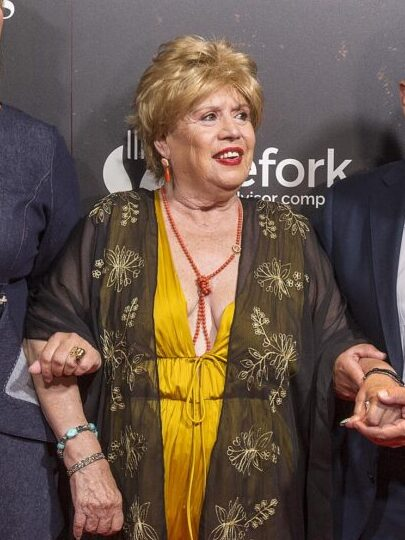
- Jiménez in 2021
- Born: María Jiménez Gallego; 3 February 1950; Seville, Spain
- Died: 7 September 2023 (aged 73); Seville, Spain
- Occupation: Singer

María Jiménez Gallego (3 February 1950 – 7 September 2023) was a Spanish singer.

== Biography ==
María Jiménez Gallego was born in Triana, Seville on 3 February 1950. At age 15, she migrated to Barcelona to work as a housemaid. She started to perform in tablaos (first in Barcelona and then in Madrid) and recorded her first album in 1976, with arrangements by Paco Cepero. The album included rumbas, tangos, bulerías, boleros, rancheras and ballads by Silvio Rodríguez, Lolita de la Colina or Amancio Prada. Next, she released Sensación and several compilations.

Her career was relaunched when she collaborated in the song La lista de la compra with the group La cabra mecánica and released Donde más duele with songs by Joaquín Sabina.

She took part in the 2002 'Day Without Music' protest against piracy.

Jiménez edited her biography and took part in several films and sitcoms like Todos los hombres sois iguales.

Jiménez was the presenter of the television program Bienaventurados on Canal Sur.

María Jiménez died in Triana, Seville on 7 September 2023, at the age of 73.

== Partial discography ==
- Bienaventurados (2006)
- Genio y figura (2005)
- Háblame En la cama – Lo mejor
- Canta Jose Alfredo Jimenez (2005)
- De María a María con sus dolores (2003)
- Donde más duele – Canta por Sabina (2002)
- 40 grandes canciones, (2000) compilation
- Canciones arrebatadas compilation 1976–1980
- Eres como eres (1995)
- Átame a tu cuerpo (1993)
- Rocios (1988)
- Alma Salvaje (1987)
- Seguir viviendo (1986)
- Voy a darte una canción (1984)
- Por primera vez (1983)
- Frente al amor (1982)
- De distinto modo (1981)
- Sensación (1980)
- Resurrección de la alegría (1979)
- Se acabó (1978)
- María Jiménez (1976)
- María La Pipa (1975)

== Filmography ==
Film

- Manuela (1976)
- Perdóname amor (1982)
- ¡Ja me maaten...! (2000)
- Yo, puta (2004)
- Los managers (2006)

Television

- Hostal Royal Manzanares
- Todos los hombres sois iguales
- Amar en tiempos revueltos

== Accolades ==
- Gold Medal of Merit in the Fine Arts (2022)
