= Robert A. Newman =

American pharmacologist

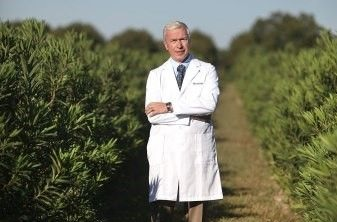
- Education: University of Connecticut
- Known for: Pharmacology
- Scientific career
- Fields: Molecular biology, Immunology
- Workplaces: University of Texas; University of Vermont

Robert A. Newman is an American pharmacologist specializing in molecular biology, drug development, and immunology.

He is professor emeritus, professor of experimental therapeutics, founder and co-director of the Center for Pharmaceutical Development of the MD Anderson Cancer Center at the University of Texas.

== Background ==
After earning his M.S. and Ph.D. in pharmacology and toxicology from the University of Connecticut, Newman worked as a postdoctoral fellow in the biochemistry department at the University of Vermont and the Medical School of the University of Georgia. He served as a faculty member at the University of Vermont Medical School for seven years and then spent a sabbatical year at Stanford University performing research on immune targeted therapy. In 1984 he was appointed as chief of the Section of Pharmacology and Experimental Therapeutics at the University of Texas M.D. Anderson Cancer, where he then spent 24 years at this institution in Houston, Texas. There he held the D. B. Lane Distinguished Professorship Chair. At MDACC he served as the founder and co-director of the Pharmaceutical Development Center and the institution's Analytical Center.

In 1988, Newman began studies of the anticancer potential of extracts and components of Nerium oleander research that was initially begun by Turkish Doctor H. Ziya Ozel.

== Works ==
Newman has published over 320 articles dealing with the preclinical and clinical pharmacology, toxicology, and development of therapies for the prevention and treatment of malignant diseases. His research and publications have detailed the novel value of oleandrin and oleander extracts in prevention of stroke mediated ischemic injury to brain tissue and more recently against key viruses (e.g. Ebola, HTLV-1, HIV).

=== Publications ===
- Singh, Shailbala; Shenoy, Sachin; Nehete, Pramod N.; Yang, Peiying; Nehete, Bharti; Fontenot, Danielle; Yang, Guojun; Newman, Robert A. «Nerium oleander derived cardiac glycoside oleandrin is a novel inhibitor of HIV infectivity». Fitoterapia 84 (1): 32–39. doi:10.1016/J.FITOTE.2012.10.017.
- Pathak, S., Multani, A. S., Narayan, S., Kumar, V., & Newman, R. A. (2000). Anvirzel(TM), an extract of Nerium oleander, induces cell death in human but not murine cancer cells. Anti-Cancer Drugs, 11(6), 455–463. https://doi.org/10.1097/00001813-200007000-00006
- Wassermann K, Zwelling LA, Lown JW, Hartley JA, Nishikawa K, Lin JR, Newman Robert A. Liblomycin-mediated DNA cleavage in human head and neck squamous carcinoma cells and purified DNA. American Association for Cancer Research. Volume 50, Issue 6, 1732-1737 DOI: Published March 1990
- Newman Robert A, Costa M, Cisneros A. High-performance liquid chromatographic measurement of the novel anti-HIV agent 7,8-dihydrocostatolide (NSC 661123). Journal of Chromatography B: Biomedical Sciences and Applications. Volume 658, Issue 1, 5 August 1994, 129-133 https://doi.org/10.1016/0378-4347(94)00194-4
- Manna SK, Sah NK, Newman Robert A, Cisneros A, Aggarwal BB. Oleandrin suppresses activation of nuclear transcription factor-kappaB, activator protein-1, and c-Jun NH2-terminal kinase. Volume 60, Issue 14, pp. 3838-3847 DOI: Published July 2000
- Lin Y, Ho DH, Newman RA. J Exp Ther Oncol. Human tumor cell sensitivity to oleandrin is dependent on relative expression of Na+, K+ -ATPase subunits. 2010;8(4):271-86. PMID 21222360
- Ni D, Madden TL, Johansen M, Felix E, Ho DH, Newman RA. J Exp Ther Oncol. Murine pharmacokinetics and metabolism of oleandrin, a cytotoxic component of Nerium oleander. 2002 Sep-Oct;2(5):278-85. PMID 12416031
