= Ingrid Rubio =

Spanish actress

- Born: Ingrid Rubio Ruiz; 2 August 1975 (age 49); Barcelona, Spain
- Occupation: Actress
- Years active: 1995–present

Ingrid Rubio Ruiz (born 2 August 1975) is a Spanish actress. She won the Special Mention Award at the 1996 San Sebastián International Film Festival for her performance in the film Taxi.

== Life and career ==
Ingrid Rubio was born in Barcelona on 2 August 1975. She made her television debut in Catalan soap opera Secrets de família. She has appeared in over 20 films since 1995 and was named in 1998 as one of European films 'Shooting Stars' by European Film.

She has appeared in a number of successful award-winning Spanish-Argentine co-produced films in the last ten years such as El Faro (1998), The Impatient Alchemist (2002) and Hermanas (2005). She regularly portrays the role of a sister in her pictures.

She has also worked on TV, for example the mini-series El corazón del océano.

== Filmography ==
- 1996 Más que amor, frenesí, with Albacete, Menkes Bardem
- 1996 Más allá del jardín, de Pedro Olea
- 1996 Taxi, de Carlos Saura
- 1997 En brazos de la mujer madura, de Manuel Lombardero
- 1998 Extraños, de Imanol Uribe
- 1998 El Faro, de Eduardo Mignogna
- 1999 La otra cara de la luna, de Lluís Josep Comerón
- 2000 Viaje de ida y vuelta
- 2000 Sé quién eres, de Patricia Ferreira
- 2000 El viaje de Arián, de Eduard Bosch
- 2001 Visionarios, de Manuel Gutiérrez Aragón
- 2001 La soledad era esto, de Sergio Renán
- 2001 El alquimista impaciente, de Patricia Ferreira
- 2002 Todas las azafatas van al cielo, de Daniel Burman
- 2002 La playa de los galgos, de Mario Camus
- 2003 Noviembre (film), de Achero Mañas
- 2003 Haz conmigo lo que quieras, de Ramón De España
- 2006 Salvador (Puig Antich), de Manuel Huerga
- 2006 Tirante el blanco, de Vicente Aranda
- 2006 Trastorno
- 2010 Que se mueran los feos
