= Robert G. Newman =

American physician, scientist, health manager and philanthropist (1937–2018)

Robert G. Newman (October 26, 1937 – August 1, 2018) was an American physician, health manager and philanthropist. He was a pioneering advocate for the use of methadone as a substitute for heroin.

== Early life and education ==
Robert Gabriel Newman was born in The Hague, Netherlands. His parents, as German Jews, were on the escape from Nazi Germany at the time. His father, Rudolph Neumann (later Randolph Newman) was a lawyer who worked as a war-crimes prosecutor after World War II. His mother Eva Neumann, born Feilchenfeldt (later Eva Newman) was a judge in Berlin. The family fled Europe to New York City in August 1939.

In 1958, Newman received a bachelor's degree at Washington Square College of New York University, and in 1963 became a Doctor of Medicine at the University of Rochester School of Medicine and Dentistry. He acquired a Master of Public Health degree at the School of Public Health University of California, Berkeley.

== Career ==
In 1967, Newman was stationed in Fukuoka, Japan as a United States Air Force surgeon.

Newman's special professional, scientific and humanitarian interests were dedicated to the treatment of heroin addiction. As early as 1968 Newman met the physician researchers Marie Nyswander and Vincent Dole, who in 1964 in New York City had begun to treat heroin addicts with methadone. From 1970, he became Assistant Commissioner for Addiction Programs at the New York City Department of Health. Under New York Mayor John Lindsay and health department administrator Gordon Chase, Newman introduced and expanded methadone therapy. The methadone program received opposition from abstinence and twelve-step program advocates. In 1998, New York Mayor Rudy Giuliani even intended to downsize the local methadone programs, but was not successful with this.

From 1976, he was vice president and from 1978 to 1997 president and CEO of Beth Israel Medical Center (today Mount Sinai Beth Israel) in Downtown Manhattan, New York City.

Between 1994 and 2012, Newman was a professor of psychiatry and behavioural sciences and a professor of epidemiology at Albert Einstein College of Medicine, New York City. Additionally between 1997–2001 he was president and CEO of Continuum Health Partners, and between 2001–2013 director of Baron Edmond de Rothschild Chemical Dependency Institute of Beth Israel hospital.

Newman was married to Seiko Kusuba Newman with whom he had a daughter.

== Death ==
In June 2018, Newman was killed when he was struck by a car in The Bronx.

== Legacy ==
Newman travelled worldwide to advocate for numerous institutions to introduce methadone therapy. This engagement earned Newman the nickname "methadone apostle" or "methadone pope".

A motto of Newman about heroin dependency respectively methadone treatment was: "It’s a medical problem – for which a treatment exists, but for which at the moment a cure does not". Newman continuously emphasized the humanitarian aspects of dealing with the drug-dependent patients.

Kasia Malinowska, director of the Global Drug Policy Program at the Open Society Foundations described Newman as a "rockstar", saying, "He thought that methadone was an effective, easy, cheap public health intervention; that it’s insane to deny it to people who are so deeply in need. [...] There are thousands and thousands and thousands of people who are Bob’s legacy. They have access to treatment. They understand that public health is the way to deal with the problem that they have."

== Honours and awards ==
- 1985 Nyswander/Dole “Marie” Awards (awarded by the American Association for the Treatment of Opioid Dependence / AATOD)
- 1994 Norman E. Zinberg Memorial Lecture Award for Achievement in the Field of Medicine (awarded by Cambridge Hospital and Harvard Medical School)
- 1996 David E. Rogers Award (awarded by Robert Wood Johnson Foundation)
- 2006 The International Rolleston Award (awarded by NGO Harm Reduction International); for an exceptional contribution to harm reduction by drug addiction
- 2014 Order of the Rising Sun (awarded by the Japanese government), for the exceptional promotion of medical academical exchange between Japan and the USA
