= María Ruiz Scaperlanda =

María Ruiz Scaperlanda is an American Roman Catholic writer and journalist.

== Life ==
She was born in Pinar del Río, Cuba, and grew up in Puerto Rico. She has an M.A. in English from the University of Oklahoma and a Bachelors in Journalism from the University of Texas at Austin. A freelance writer since 1981, she is the author of several books and has been published regularly in numerous national and regional periodicals and newspapers, including "The New York Times," Catholic Digest, U.S. Catholic, Our Sunday Visitor, The Oklahoman, Columbia, St. Anthony Messenger and The Lutheran. She and her husband Michael live in Norman, Oklahoma. They have four adult children. She blogs at Day by Day with María.

== Publications ==
- Their Faith Has Touched Us: The Legacies of Three Young Oklahoma City Bombing Victims (1998). ISBN 1-58051-023-X
- Edith Stein: St Teresa Benedicta of the Cross (2001) ISBN 0-87973-832-4
- The Seeker's Guide to Mary (2002) ISBN 0-8294-1489-4
- The Journey: A Guide for the Modern Pilgrim (with Michael Scaperlanda) (2004) ISBN 0-8294-1617-X
- The Complete Idiot's Guide to Mary of Nazareth (2006) ISBN 1-59257-482-3
