= Víctor Pérez (director) =

Victor Perez
- Victor Raul Perez Raya
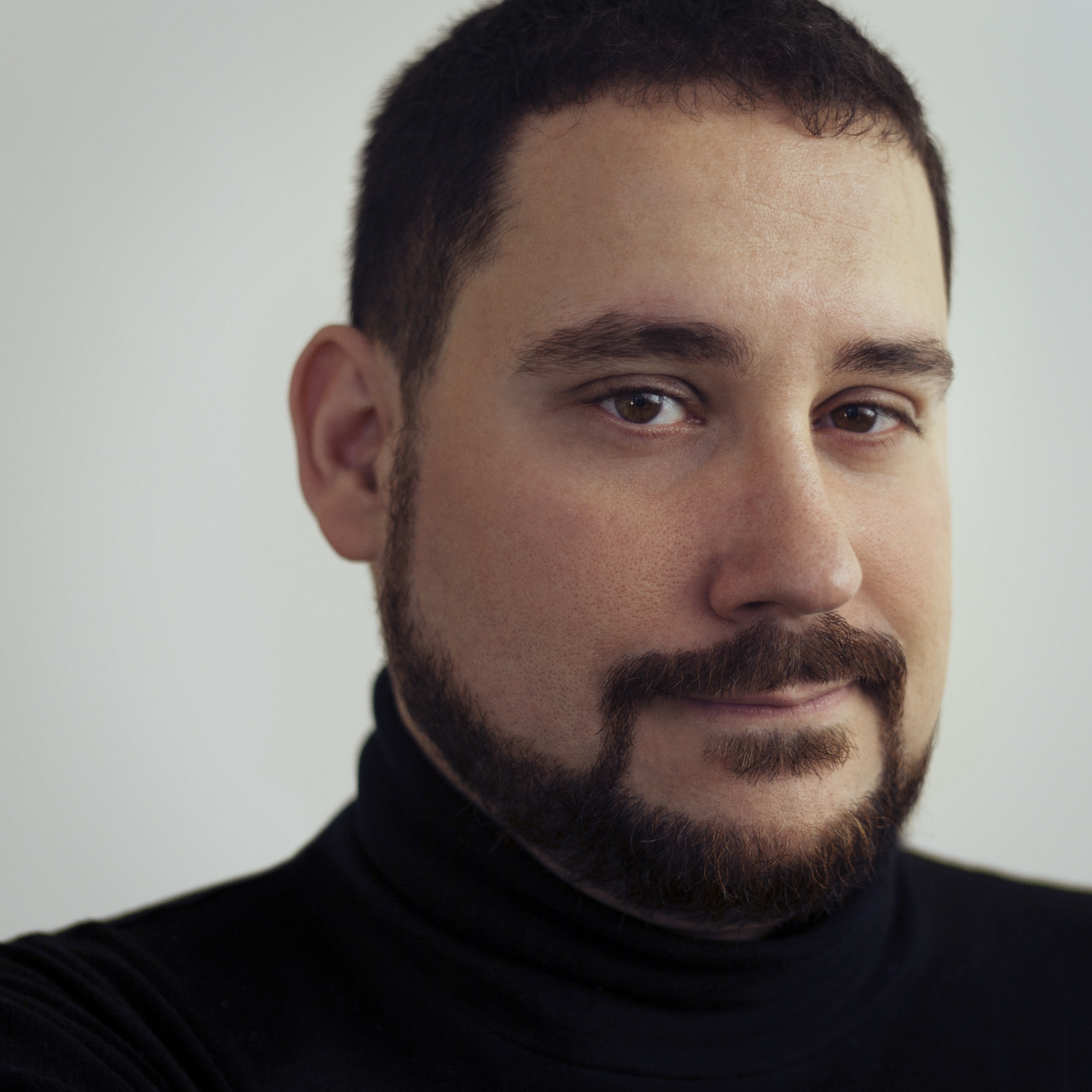
- Born: February 11, 1981 (age 45); Cordoba, Spain
- Occupations: Director, producer, digital film compositor
- Years active: 1997-present
- Notable work: The Dark Knight Rises, Harry Potter and the Deathly Hallows, Les Miserables and Pirates of the Caribbean: On Stranger Tides
- Spouse: Maria Chiara Ranieri
- Children: 1

Víctor Raúl Pérez Raya (born 11 February 1981), is a Spanish film director, producer and digital film compositor who has worked on a number of Hollywood films, including The Dark Knight Rises, Harry Potter and the Deathly Hallows, Les Miserables and Pirates of the Caribbean: On Stranger Tides.

== Education and career ==
Perez advocates the controversial practice of using of generative artificial intelligence in filmmaking and visual effects.

He studied performing arts first at the Escuela Municipal de Teatro Duque de Rivas in Lucena (his birthplace), and then at the Escuela Superior de Arte Dramático in Málaga, Spain, graduating in 2004. He then traveled to Italy to study Commedia dell'Arte and renaissance mask making under Antonio Fava. Following his studies, he founded his own theater company, Gestus, where he began directing and producing on the stage with plays including El Tendedero, Versus and The Zanni Skinhead Comedy, which he co-produced with Commedia dell’Arte director Antonio Fava. Perez's first film role was in 2006, when he was cast in the film Summer Rain, directed by Antonio Banderas.

He then traveled to Italy to study Commedia dell'Arte and renaissance mask making under Antonio Fava, as well as work with the Spanish stage company Laviebel. He also studied at the International Academy of Image Arts and Sciences in L'Aquila, Italy, studying film direction and earning an honorary degree, as well as frequently traveling to the US to study visual effects from Steve Wright.

In 2009, his home and studio were destroyed in the earthquake in L'Aquila. Perez then moved to London to study Visual Effects (VFX) at Escape Studios. Following his graduation from Escape, Perez went to Union VFX, where he worked on the Fox Searchlight film 127 Hours as both digital compositor and technical director. Perez then relocated to Canada to work for IMAX, before returning to London to work at Cinesite and then Double Negative. He went on to co-found Masked Frame Pictures where he co-produced and starred in the 2013 short film Project Kronos. In 2013, he also joined Glowfrog’s VFX team as a compositing supervisor, before starting the production of his short film The Girl and the Mask.

== Filmography ==
=== Actor ===
- Summer Rain - González Cortés (2006)
- Project Kronos (Short) - Jonathan Drakensko (2013)

=== Producer ===
- Project Kronos (Short) - 2013
- Another Love (Short) - 2015

=== Director ===
- The Girl and the Mask - In development
- Ensemble - In development, scheduled for release in 2017
- Echo (Short) - 2015
- Another Love (Short) - 2015
- Following the River Flow (Music Video) - 2014

=== Visual Effects ===
- Reiki - digital compositor (2009)
- 40 Years (Short) - lead compositor (2010)
- 127 Hours - digital compositor & compositing TD (2010)
- Harry Potter and the Deathly Hallows: Part 1 - digital compositor (2010)
- This is My Land... Hebron (Documentary) - visual effects supervisor (2010)
- Il generale Della Rovere (TV Movie) - digital compositor (2011)
- Pirates of the Caribbean: On Stranger Tides - digital compositor (2011)
- Will - digital compositor (2011)
- Haywire - digital compositor (2011)
- John Carter - compositor (2012)
- The Bourne Legacy - digital compositor (2012)
- Total Recall - digital compositor - uncredited (2012)
- The Dark Knight Rises - digital compositor (2012)
- Viaje a Surtsey - lead compositor (2012)
- Les Misérables - compositor (2012)
- Un giorno devi andare - digital compositor (2013)
- Trance - visual effects artist (2013)
- Road to Capri - visual effects supervisor (2015)
- The Chronicles of Young George Washington - visual effects supervisor (2016)

== Certification and affiliation ==
Victor Perez is a certified NUKE trainer. A digital compositing software produced and distributed by The Foundry, NUKE is used for film and television post-production. With certification from the Foundry, Perez taught master classes in NUKE Digital Compositing through the Spanish and Latin-American focused online visual effects school VFX Learning He currently master classes through various institutions such as Visual Forum X, and collaborates with visual effects schools such as Escape Studios (where he teaches and design lessons plans), FXPDH and CMIVFX, focusing in specific areas of digital compositing. He is a member of the Visual Effects Society (VES), an organization of people in the visual effects industry, including artists, technologists and model makers who work in film, television, commercials, music videos and games. He is also a Member and collaborator of Nukepedia, an online community for NUKE compositors, where he publishes articles, tools and Python programming scripts for artists.

== Awards ==
Perez worked on the visual effects team for Harry Potter and the Deathly Hallows, which won a BAFTA award for visual effects in 2012. He was also voted the year’s second most valuable contributor in 2012 on Nukepedia.
