= The Impatient Alchemist =

- Spanish: El alquimista impaciente
- Directed by: Patricia Ferreira
- Written by: Patricia Ferreira; Enrique Jiménez
- Based on: El alquimista impaciente by Lorenzo Silva
- Starring: Ingrid Rubio; Roberto Enríquez; Chete Lera
- Music by: Javier Navarrete; José Nieto
- Production companies: Tornasol Films; Continental; Cartel; Patagonik Film Group
- Distributed by: Buena Vista International
- Release date: 15 May 2002 (Spain)
- Running time: 111 minutes
- Countries: Spain; Argentina
- Language: Spanish

The Impatient Alchemist (Spanish: El alquimista impaciente) is a 2002 Spanish–Argentine film directed by Patricia Ferreira which adapts the novel El alquimista impaciente by Lorenzo Silva. It stars Ingrid Rubio, Roberto Enríquez and Chete Lera, also featuring Adriana Ozores and Miguel Ángel Solá.

== Synopsis ==
A naked corpse, devoid of any signs of violence, is found tied to a bed in a roadside motel. Sergeant Rubén Bevilacqua (Roberto Enríquez) of the Central Operational Unit of the Civil Guard (UCO) and his assistant, Virginia Chamorro (Íngrid Rubio), are tasked with investigating the death. They soon discover that the deceased was Trinidad Soler, an ordinary man with a wife and two young children, highly regarded for his work at the nuclear power plant. Was it a natural death due to excess or murder? The case doesn't seem straightforward at all.

== Cast ==
- Roberto Enríquez as Vila.
- Ingrid Rubio as Virginia Chamorro.
- Adriana Ozores as Blanca Díez.
- Miguel Ángel Solá as León Zaldívar.
- Chete Lera as Luis Dávila.
- Mariana Santángelo as Patricia Zaldívar.

== Release ==
It was theatrically released in Spain on 15 May 2002.

== See also ==
- List of Spanish films of 2002
