= Summer Rain (2006 film) =

- Theatrical release poster
- Spanish: El camino de los ingleses
- Directed by: Antonio Banderas
- Screenplay by: Antonio Soler
- Based on: Summer Rain by Antonio Soler
- Produced by: Antonio Banderas
- Starring: Alberto Amarilla; María Ruiz; Félix Gómez; Raúl Arévalo; Fran Perea; Marta Nieto; Mario Casas; Antonio Garrido; Antonio Zafra; Berta de la Dehesa; Victor Perez; Cuca Escribano; Lucio Romero; Romay Rodríguez; Pepa Aniorte; Helen Rasmussen; Stephen Porter; Juan Diego; Victoria Abril
- Cinematography: Xavi Giménez
- Edited by: Mercedes Alted
- Music by: Antonio Meliveo
- Production companies: Green Moon Productions; Sogecine; Future Films
- Distributed by: Sogepaq
- Release date: 1 December 2006 (Spain)
- Running time: 118 minutes
- Countries: Spain; United Kingdom; United States
- Language: Spanish
- Box office: $2.4 million

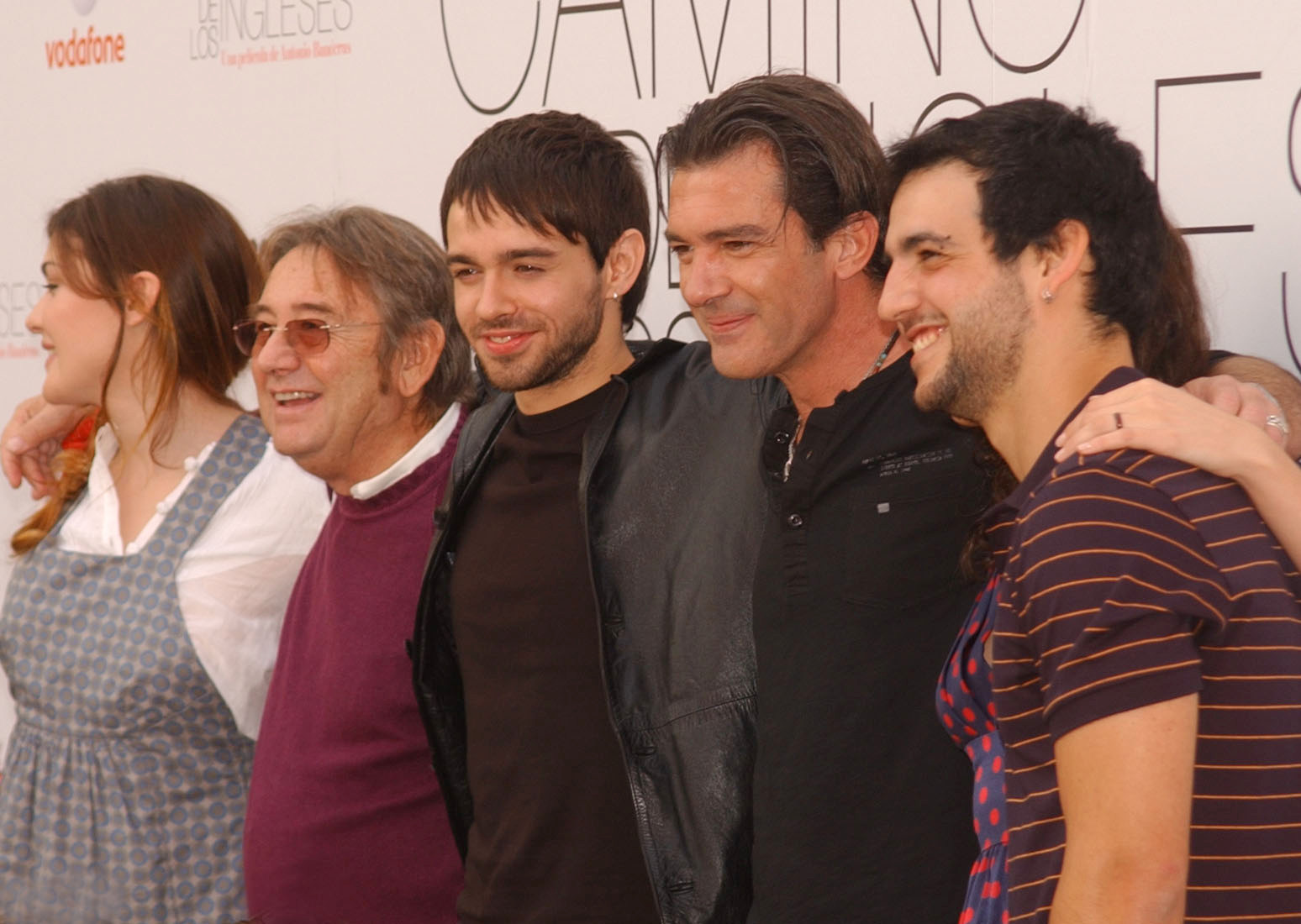
Antonio Banderas and the cast of Summer Rain at the 2006 Málaga Film Festival

Summer Rain (Spanish: El camino de los ingleses, lit. 'Englishmen's Road') is a 2006 romantic drama film directed by Spanish actor Antonio Banderas from a screenplay by Antonio Soler, based on his novel of the same name.

== Plot ==
The film takes place in 1978 in Málaga, Spain, and depicts the life of teenager Miguelito Dávila, who after suffering from kidney disease and spending some time at the hospital, has learned such classic poetry as Dante's Divine Comedy and dreams of leaving his job at a hardware store and pursuing his dream of becoming a poet.

One summer, he hangs out with his childhood friends Babirusa, Paco Frontón and Moratalla, until he meets a girl called Luli at the swimming pool, and the two start dating. Luli would love to become a professional dancer, and is best friends with "La cuerpo", who fancies Miguelito's posh friend Paco. The two couples spend time together swimming, and they gradually experiment with other distractions.

Miguelito later meets an older teacher, who is interested in his talent, and begins an affair with her around the same time that Cardona, an older and apparently richer man, starts courting Luli with the promise of helping her career as a dancer.

== Cast ==
- Alberto Amarilla as Miguelito Dávila
- María Ruiz as Luli
- Félix Gómez as Paco Frontón
- Raúl Arévalo as Babirusa
- Fran Perea as "El Garganta"
- Marta Nieto as "La Cuerpo"
- Mario Casas as Moratalla
- Antonio Garrido as Cardona
- Victoria Abril as Ms. del Casco Cartaginés
- Victor Perez as González-Cortés
