= Roberto Enríquez =

Spanish actor (born 1968)

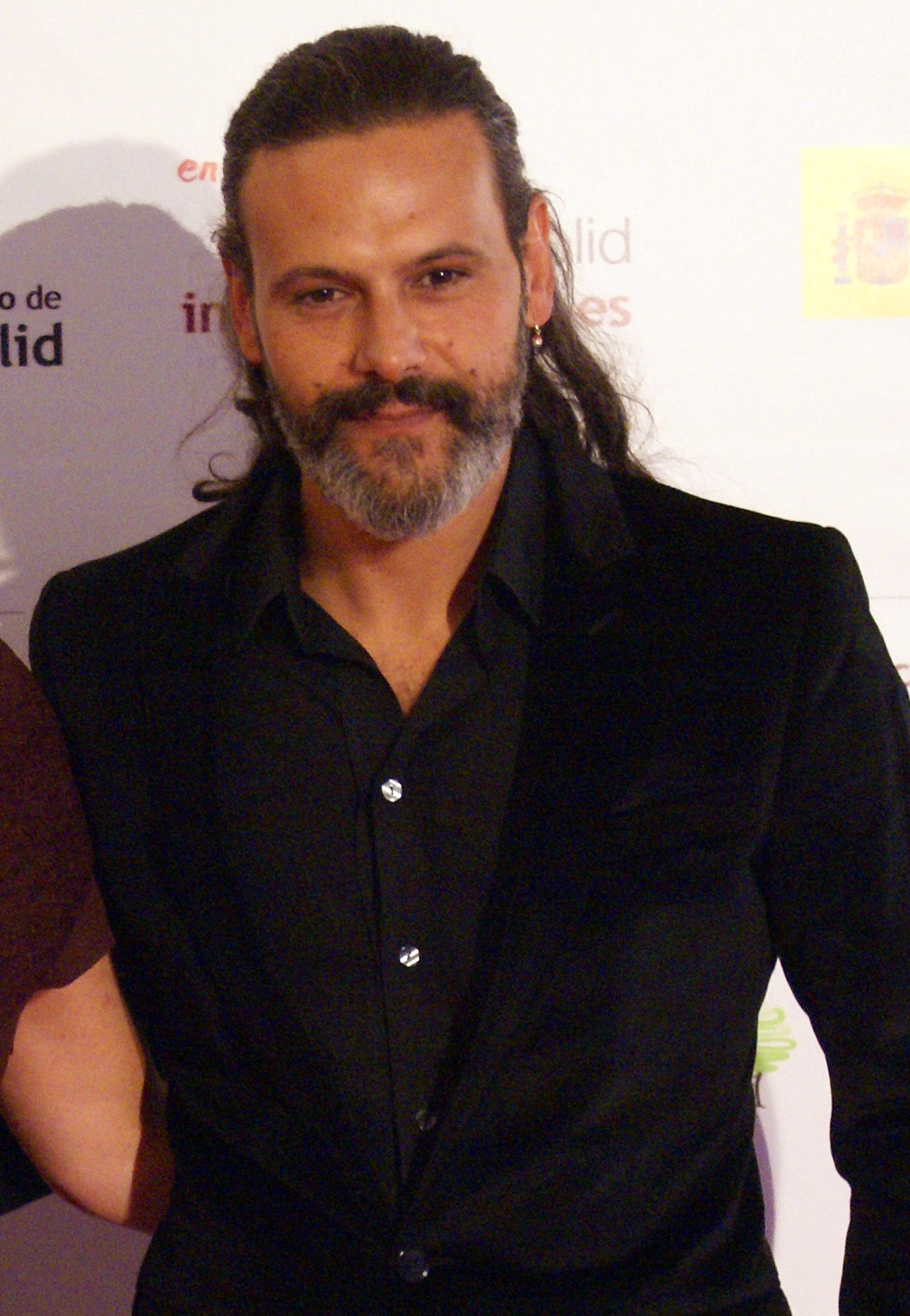
- Enríquez in 2011
- Born: Roberto Enríquez Asenjo; 20 January 1968 (age 58); Fabero, Province of León, Spain
- Occupation: Actor

Roberto Enríquez Asenjo (born 20 January 1968) is a Spanish actor. He is known for his performances in television series such as Locked Up, Hispania, la leyenda and La señora and in films such as Fat People.

== Biography ==
Roberto Enríquez Asenjo was born in Fabero, Province of León, on 20 January 1968, although he was raised in Valladolid. His family is from Arganza. He grew up in "Los Pajarillos" neighborhood. He trained as an actor at the Valladolid's Escuela de Arte Dramático from 1986 to 1989. He moved to Madrid afterwards.

Enríquez started his acting career as a stage actor in the late 1980s. Enríquez performed in the sitcom Colegio Mayor, which began airing on the Madrilenian regional broadcaster in 1994. He also landed a recurring role in the 1995 sitcom Pepa y Pepe, performing Pol, an aspiring model and one of the boyfriends of the character played by María Adánez. He has his debut in a featured film with his performance in Pepe Guindo (1999). His first starring performance came with the telenovela Esencia de poder, playing the role of Javier Márquez. He also appeared in television series such as Ellas son así, Hospital Central and Lobos, La señora and 14 de abril. La República (in which he reprised his role in La Señora). His breakout film performance was his starring role in the 2002 film El alquimista impaciente, which earned him a nomination to the Goya Award for Best New Actor. He performed the role of Paolo Orsini in the 2006 film Los Borgia. He also performed in other feature films such as Azuloscurocasinegro, Vidas pequeñas and Fat People.

In 2010, Enríquez was cast to play the lead character of the historical drama series Hispania, la leyenda, Viriato. He later performed the role of Muley Hacén, Sultan of Granada and Boabdil's father, in the second season of Isabel. From 2015 to 2018, he starred in the thriller drama series Vis a vis (Locked Up) in the role of Fabio Martínez, a prison officer. He appeared as Mauro, Viruca's former husband in the 2020 Netflix series El desorden que dejas (The Mess You Leave Behind). He starred as lead character in the 2021 historical romantic drama La cocinera de Castamar.

== Filmography ==
=== Television ===
Year	Title	Role	Notes	Ref.
1995	Pepa y Pepe	Pol		
2001	Esencia de poder	Javier Márquez		
2005	Lobos	Jaime		
2009–2010	La señora	Gonzalo López, Marquis of Castro		
2010	La princesa de Éboli	Juan de Escobedo	TV movie aired as 2-episode miniseries	
2010–2012	Hispania, la leyenda	Viriato		
2011	14 de abril. La República	Gonzalo		
2013	Isabel	Muley Hacén		
2015–2018	Vis a vis (Locked Up)	Fabio Martínez		
2018	Gigantes	Ortiz		
2018–2019	Todo por el juego	Mariano Hidalgo		
2019–2020	El embarcadero	Conrado		
2020	El desorden que dejas (The Mess You Leave Behind)	Mauro		
2021	La cocinera de Castamar (The Cook of Castamar)	Diego de Castamar, Duke of Castamar		

=== Film ===
Year	Title	Role	Notes	Ref.
2000	Sé quién eres (I Know Who You Are)	Álvaro		
2000	Las razones de mis amigos (Friends Have Reasons)	Vicente		
2002	El alquimista impaciente (The Impatient Alchemist)	Rubén Bevilacqua		
2004	Nubes de verano (Summer's Clouds)	Daniel		
2006	Los aires difíciles (Rough Winds)	Damián		
2006	Los Borgia (The Borgia)	Paolo Orsini		
2009	Gordos (Fat People)	Abel		
2010	Vidas pequeñas (Small Lives)	Andrés		
2022	La manzana de oro	Mateo		

== Awards and nominations ==
Year	Award	Category	Work	Result	Ref.
2003	17th Goya Awards	Best New Actor	The Impatient Alchemist	Nominated	
2007	16th Actors and Actresses Union Awards	Best Film Actor in a Minor Role	The Borgia	Nominated	
2010	19th Actors and Actresses Union Awards	Best Television Actor in a Leading Role	La señora	Won	
2013	22nd Actors and Actresses Union Awards	Best Television Actor in a Leading Role	Hispania, la leyenda	Won	
2014	23rd Actors and Actresses Union Awards	Best Television Actor in a Leading Role	Isabel	Nominated	
2016	25th Actors and Actresses Union Awards	Best Television Actor in a Leading Role	Locked Up	Nominated	
