= María Ruiz Cruz =

Spanish actress (born 1980)

Maria Ruiz
- Born: María Ruiz Cruz; 18 May 1980 (age 46); Santander, Cantabria (Spain)
- Occupation: Actress
- Years active: 2004–present
- Website: Instagram site

María Ruiz (born 18 May 1980 in Santander, Cantabria) is a Spanish actress, known for her lead role in the film Summer Rain (El Camino de los Ingleses), directed by Antonio Banderas.

== Career ==
María Ruiz studied classical ballet and flamenco at the CAD Armengou school in Santander. In 1999, she moved to Madrid to further her dance studies with flamenco and ballet teachers Merche Esmeralda, Carmen Roche, and Juan Carlos Santamaría, while working as a professional dancer in TV shows (Sorpresa Sorpresa, Gran Prix, Furor) and as a dancer and choreographer for the musician Nacho Cano. She subsequently studied acting at the drama school Theatre for the People.

In 2004, she acted in her first feature film, playing the role of Piedad in El asombroso mundo de Borjamari y Pocholo, directed and produced by Enrique López Lavigne (The Impossible). In 2006, she was cast in the leading role in Antonio Banderas' feature film, Summer Rain (El Camino de los Ingleses), which was based on the book by Antonio Soler and was the second film directed by Antonio Banderas, after Crazy in Alabama. This film was screened at the Sundance Film Festival and won the European Cinemas Label at the Berlin International Film Festival the same year. In 2007, she shot the film Un buen día lo tine cualquiera, directed by Spanish cult director Santiago Lorenzo, and worked in several TV series in 2007 and 2008. In 2009, she played the iconic Carmina Ordoñez, the first wife of Spanish bullfighter Francisco Rivera (Paquirri), in the TV movie Paquirri. In 2011, she starred in the experimental film El sabor salado de las lágrimas, directed by Augusto Martínez Torres.

Maria Ruiz has performed in several short films, including "Another Love" (2015)—produced by MaskedFrame Pictures (UK) and directed by Victor Pérez (Harry Potter and the Deathly Hallows, Les Misérables), co-starring Nigel Barber (Mission Impossible: Rogue_Nation, Spectre)—and "Echo" (2016), directed by Perez and produced by Stiller Studios.

Ruiz has also performed in theatre. In 2008, she played Iulia Macedonia in Plauto's, Miles Gloriosus. The play premiered at the 54th Mérida International Festival of Classical Theatre, becoming the most attended play in the history of the festival. In 2010, she wrote and starred in Help Me Succeed (Ayúdame a triunfar), directed by Marisa Lull. In 2012, she performed as Mina in Dracula, alongside Emilio Gutiérrez-Caba. The play opened in the Lope de Vega theatre (Seville) and toured Spain before coming to the Marquina Theatre (Madrid), where it had a run of several months.

== Credits ==
Year	Title	Type	Role	Director
2002	"El amargo del Pomelo" (Nacho Cano)	Videoclip	Lead	Ernesto Martín
2003	"Vidas Cruzadas" (Quique González)	Videoclip	Girl	David Serrano
2004	El asombroso mundo de Borjamari y Pocholo	Feature Film	Piedad	Enrique López Lavigne and Juan Cavestany
2006	Summer Rain	Feature Film	Luli	Antonio Banderas
2006	"Hikikomori"	Short	Lucía	Iván Rivas
2007	Un buen día lo tiene cualquiera	Feature Film	Maite	Santiago Lorenzo
2007	Los simuladores	TV series (Cuatro)	Clara Hurtado	Jorge Torregrossa
2008	El síndrome de Ulises	TV series (Antena 3)	Leonor Phillips Leguineche	Roberto Santiago
2008	Miles Gloriosus	Theatre	Giulia Macedonia	Cuco Afonso
2009	Paquirri	TV movie (Telecinco)	Carmina Ordóñez	Salvador Calvo
2009	"Los planes de Cecilia"	Short	Cecilia	Belén Gómez Sanz
2010	Help me succeed	Theatre	Jane Rubi	Marisa Lull
2010	"Los años del silencio"	Short	Madre	Marcel Leal
2011	El sabor salado de las lágrimas	Feature Film	Chica	Augusto Martinez Torres
2012	Dracula	Theatre	Mina	Jorge de Juan and Eduardo Bazo
2013	"Loose"	Videoclip	Groupie	Terence Gross
2015	"Another Love"	Short	Kate	Victor Pérez
2016	"Echo"	Short	Emma	Victor Pérez
