= Fran Perea =

Spanish actor and singer

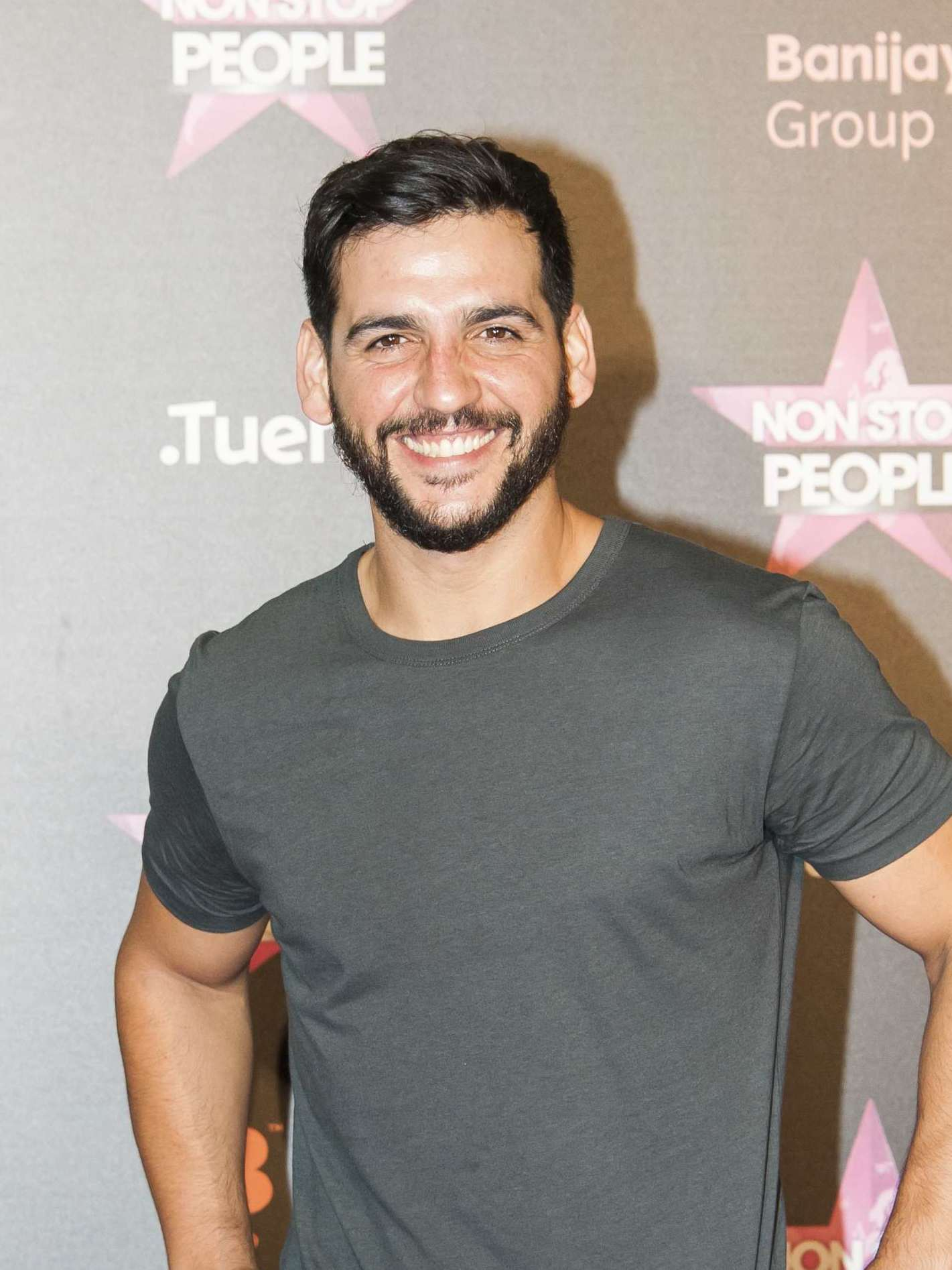
- Born: Francisco Manuel Perea Bilbao; 20 November 1978 (age 47); Málaga, Spain
- Occupations: Actor, singer
- Years active: 2000–present

Francisco Manuel Perea Bilbao (born 20 November 1978 in Málaga, Andalucía, Spain), professionally known as Fran Perea, is a Spanish actor and singer.

== Career ==
Fran Perea graduated from the Escuela Superior de Arte Dramático of Málaga. He made his debut in 2000, acting Hugo in television series Al salir de clase. He portrayed Hugo from 2001 to 2002.

In 2003, Perea got the role of Marcos Serrano in television sitcom Los Serrano. He also sang the opening theme "1 más 1 son 7", and was a huge hit in 2003. Due to his role of Marcos, Fran Perea became a famous singer. His first album, La chica de la habitación de al lado, was totally inspired by his role in Los Serrano. It earned four Platinum and one Gold discs. In 2004, he had a Spanish tour, and recorded the live hits album Fran Perea, en concierto. In 2005, he released his second album Punto y Aparte, that followed the success of La chica de la habitación de al lado. One year later, Perea left Los Serrano and started acting in films.

In 2006, he portrayed David in film Los Mánagers, directed by Fernando Guillén Cuervo. Also, he was the protagonist of 2006 film El camino de los ingleses, directed by famous actor Antonio Banderas. When Banderas selected him for the film, he did not know that Perea was very famous in Spain for his roles in the TV-series Al salir de clase and Los Serrano.

In 2007, Perea acted in Goya-nominated film Las 13 rosas, directed by Emilio Martínez Lázaro. And that year, he started performing in plays like ‘Fedra’ as Hipolito along with some of the big names of the Spanish dramaturgy: Ana Belén as Fedra, José Carlos Plaza as director and Juan Mayorga as scriptwriter.

After that he participated on the TV series ‘Hospital Central’and played the role of Don Juan in ‘Don Juan, el burlador de Sevilla’, under the orders of Emilio Hernández. The debut took place in Naples and the play was also performed in the Classical Theater Festival of Almagro. In 2009 and 2010, once again, he played Hipolito on stage.

In 2010, Fran Perea launched his third album, 'Viejos conocidos'. This is the first album all made by Fran: written by him and produced by his label Sinfonía en No Bemol. In May and July 2012 he has had a tour with this album around Spain.

He shot a new film, 'Chrysalis', debut of director Paula Ortiz, which share the story of Maribel Verdú and Roberto Alamo. And he participated with a short role in 'Balada triste de trompeta' by Alex de la Iglesia, who directed the first clip of 'Viejos conocidos', corresponding to the single 'Carnaval'.

On television, he was honored to participate in the revival of the classic TVE Estudio 1, as Camilo of 'La viuda de Valencia', with Aitana Sanchez-Gijon and Jorge Roelas, among other peers. A new experience for him as it had to apply the concept stage to the television format.

In 2011, he toured in the role of Chris Keller in 'All My Sons' (Arthur Miller), under the direction of Argentine director Claudio Tolcachir, who also adapted Miller's text.

Now Fran is part of the cast of a new serie in the Spanish channel Antena 3, named 'Luna, el misterio de Calenda' and he is Orestes in the new play of José Carlos Plaza, again with Ana Belén.

Fran released his fourth album "Viaja la palabra" and started a tour in Serbia.

=== Politics ===
Perea participated with other Spanish celebrities in a campaign in support of José Luis Rodríguez Zapatero as candidate for Prime Minister of Spain in the elections in 2008.

== Filmography ==
=== Television ===
- Al salir de clase (2001–2002) as Hugo
- Los Serrano (2003–2006) as Marcos Serrano
- Luna, The Mystery of Calenda (2012–2013) as Ignacio "Nacho" Castro
- B&B (2014–2015) as Mario
- La sonata del silencio (2016) as Mauricio Canales.

=== Guest roles ===
- El comisario (2002, 2003) as Guti
- Los Serrano (2007, 2008) as Marcos Serrano
- Muchachada Nui (2007) as Marcial Ruíz Escribano
- Hospital central (2007) as Javi
- Hospital central (2008) as Dr Enrique Trujillo

=== Film ===
- Los managers (2006) as David
- El camino de los ingleses (2006) as El Garganta
- Perez, el ratoncito de tus sueños (2007) (voice)
- Las 13 rosas (2007) as Teo

=== Short films ===
- Tu mismo (2000)
- Cañí (2000)
- Final feliz para un crimen de Aure Roces (2001)
- La aventura de Rosa de Ángela Armero (2008)

== Discography ==
=== Studio albums ===
- 2003: La chica de la habitación de al lado No. 2 Spain, No. 10 Finland
- 2005: Punto y Aparte No. 8 in Spain
- 2010: Viejos conocidos

=== Live Hits albums ===
- 2004: Fran Perea, en concierto No. 60 Spain

=== Compilation albums ===
- 2006: Fran Perea, singles, inéditos & otros puntos No. 57 Spain

== Awards and nominations ==
=== Music ===
- 2003: Premios Amigo — Best New Artist — Nominated
