= Robert D. Newman =

American poet

Robert D. Newman is an American literary scholar, poet, and the former president and director of the National Humanities Center. From 2001 to 2015 he served as dean of the College of Humanities, Associate Vice President for Interdisciplinary Studies, and professor of English at the University of Utah where he was widely recognized for his efforts to increase support for the college, expand its program offerings, and in support of greater campus diversity.

== Career ==
Robert Newman was educated at Pennsylvania State University, (B.A. with honors in English), Goddard College (M.A. in Literature and Aesthetics) and the University of North Carolina at Chapel Hill (Ph.D. in English, 1982). He spent his early teaching career at The College of William and Mary, Texas A&M University, and the University of South Carolina where he served as chair of the English department. In 2001, he left the University of South Carolina to become Dean of the College of Humanities at the University of Utah. Newman's scholarship has been focused on James Joyce, twentieth century literature and culture, and narrative theory. He has published six books, two of which have been nominated for major national awards, and numerous articles and reviews; and has been the recipient of distinguished teaching awards. He also serves as General Editor of the “Cultural Frames, Framing Culture” series published by University of Virginia Press and on several boards of directors dealing with environmental, human rights, and western folklife concerns.

As dean of the College of Humanities at the University of Utah, Newman earned a reputation for energetic leadership and innovation, including the establishment of a new environmental humanities program and the Taft-Nicholson Center for Environmental Humanities Education in Lakeview, MT, as well as a successful campaign to build a new humanities building on campus. He also established new interdisciplinary and international programs and centers focused on International Studies, Religious Studies, New Media Studies, Peace and Conflict Studies, and Comparative Literature and Culture as well as the university's first Writing Center, and new Asia, Latin America and American West Centers. He also raised funds for and established one of the most successful first generation scholarship programs in the country with a near 100% graduation rate.

In July, 2015, Newman became the sixth president and director of the National Humanities Center in Research Triangle Park, North Carolina. Since taking office, he has been a vocal advocate on behalf of the humanities, calling attention to the role they play in a democratic society, their value in addressing complex challenges such as climate change, and influencing the way individuals live their lives and understand their place in the world.

== Selected bibliography ==
- Uncommon Threads: Reading and Writing About Contemporary America, with Jean Bohner and Melissa Johnson, 2003
- Centuries' Ends, Narrative Means, editor, 1996
- Pedagogy, Praxis, Ulysses: Using Joyce's Text to Transform the Classroom, 1996
- Transgressions of Reading: Narrative Engagement as Exile and Return, 1993
- Joyce's Ulysses: The Larger Perspective, edited with Weldon Thornton, 1987
- Understanding Thomas Pynchon, 1986
- Cultural Frames, Framing Culture series, General Editor
