= David Botello =

American muralist

David Botello (born September 24, 1946, Los Angeles, California) is a Chicano artist who bolstered the Chicanx movement and dedicated his life to accessible art, especially through mural painting in Los Angeles and supporting other young artists. He has spent more than 40 years working to make art more accessible to the public.

== Early life ==
Botello was born in East Los Angeles and grew up interested in art. His parents both had an appreciation for the arts, and his mother would take him to theaters, Disney movies, and museums, while his father, who worked for a cabinet company, would sketch in front of him from when he was just a young age. Botello recalled that growing up seeing these sketches impressed him and stuck with him as he grew.

Botello served in the US army, and was sent to Europe, unlike most American soldiers at the time, who were sent to Vietnam. As part of the US army, Botello formally created his first mural. His time in Europe, as well as the added exposure to the variety of European art, motivated and fueled his own artistic goals once he arrived back home. He remarked that the moment he knew he could be an artist was in Europe.

== Activism ==
Upon returning to the United States after completing his time in the military, Botello reflected on his good fortune to not have been sent to Vietnam. He also began to question the United States’ involvement in Vietnam at all. Botello's views became increasingly politicized, and he began identifying as Chicano in 1970. His activist interests and new found identity led him to participate in the Chicano Vietnam Moratorium on August 29, 1970. He reflected on this as a time he was very proud to be an activist and how it brought a community to work together despite background and identity.

== Artistic career ==
Botello took his first trip to Mexico City as a Chicano with his friend, Juan Gonzalez. They sought out exposure to all the art they could access. They decided to cofound GOEZ Art Studios and Gallery with Gonzalez's brother Jose Luis Gonzalez in 1969. It served as a space for local artists to meet, create, exhibit, trade, and sell their art. The gallery has been variously known as TELASOMAFA, Goez Imports and Fine Arts, and the Goez Art Studios and Gallery. The gallery focused on mainly Chicano art and just four years later, Botello became one of the first artists to paint murals for Estrada Courts in which was a public housing project in Boyle Heights.

=== East Los Angeles Streetscapers ===
The East Los Angeles Streetscapers was founded in 1975 by Botello and his childhood friend, Wayne Healy. The two wanted to create a public art group that cultivated a community both supportive and appreciative of Chicano culture. Welcoming each and every enthusiastic artist, the group blends together different styles to create a vivid picture of both underrepresented stories to the walls of the city. Some of their many pieces include Chicano Time Trip, The Poets Wall, and Corrido de Boyle Heights.

== Notable works ==
In 1973-74 Botello completed Dreams of Flight in Boyle Heights for a public housing project. The mural was a solo project and features a child on a tire swing as the subject. Its message is a beacon of hope that children in the community will soar in life and become successful. It was also modified by Botello in 1996 to repaint the child as a girl (previously depicted as a boy) as a response to feminist movements.

In 1974 Botello collaborated with Don Juan/Johnny D. González (project concept, architecture, and mural designer), Robert Arenivar (mural designer), Joel Suro Olivares (ceramist) (this was important because the mural was on tile), and José Luis González (partner) as a mural designer on The Story of Our Struggle located on First Street Store, East Los Angeles. They worked with the architect of the building to ensure that the mural fit seamlessly.

In 1975, Botello collaborated with Robin Dunitz on Read Between the Lines (Cuidanse Amigos). It is located in East Los Angeles and depicts different Chicano figures, one a worker who is enslaved by modern technology while the rest of his family watches TV that shoes sex, violence, and patriotism. There is also a boy who is reading about his Mexican history with an Aztec god behind him encouraging him to continue learning about his heritage. The mural is located on the corner of Daly Street and North Broadway in Lincoln Heights and is considered a depiction of Chicanx culture.

In 1977 Chicano Time Trip began and Botello collaborated with Wayne Healy and Robin Dunitz on a five-panel mural that read right to left including pieces with subject matter of pre-Columbian society, the Spanish conquest and colonialism, Mexican independence, the Mexican Revolution, and the present day Chicano family.

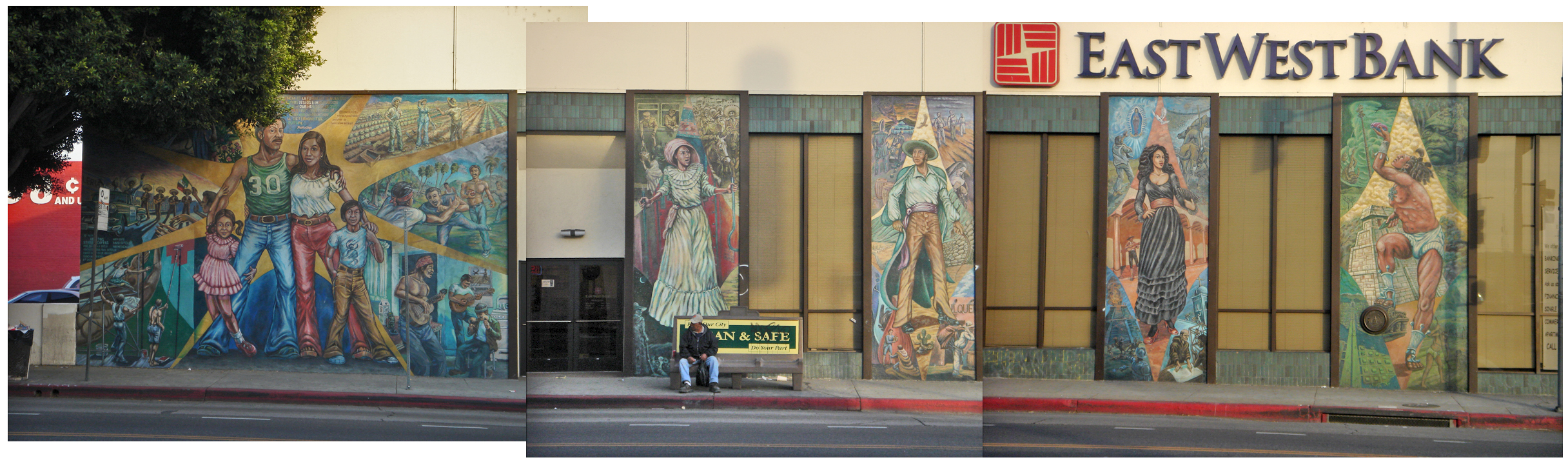
Chicano Time Trip Picture Taken in 2020. Depicts all five subjects as described above they read right to left from pre-Columbian society to present day Chicano Family La Familia, which is described in further detail below.

In 1977, Botello collaborated with Wayne Healy as The East Los Angeles Streetscapers on La Familia as part of a five panel series named Chicano Time Trip. The mural depicts a Chicanx family with one boy and one girl as they struggle to find their identity as Mexican-Americans in a world full of whiteness. It is located in Lincoln Heights in East Los Angeles.

In 1992, Botello collaborated with Rich Raya, Wayne Healy, and D. Montez on Take the Future in Your Hands. The mural is on Haddon Elementary School and features four children of different ethnicities showcasing their background and culture prominently.

In 1999, Botello's art was featured in the publication Arte de las América. This fine art catalog included works from him and other twelve artists in the art movement for future generations. Arte de las Américas was one of the Galería de las Américas major projects to promote Chicano and Latino Americano art work.

== Mission and legacy ==
Botello's art leaves a legacy that is known fondly in the Chicanx community. Although Botello left the GOEZ Art Studios and Gallery, it lives on to serve to spread cultural awareness, knowledge, and expression for the community.
