= Patricia Ferreira (director) =

Spanish director and screenwriter (1958–2023)

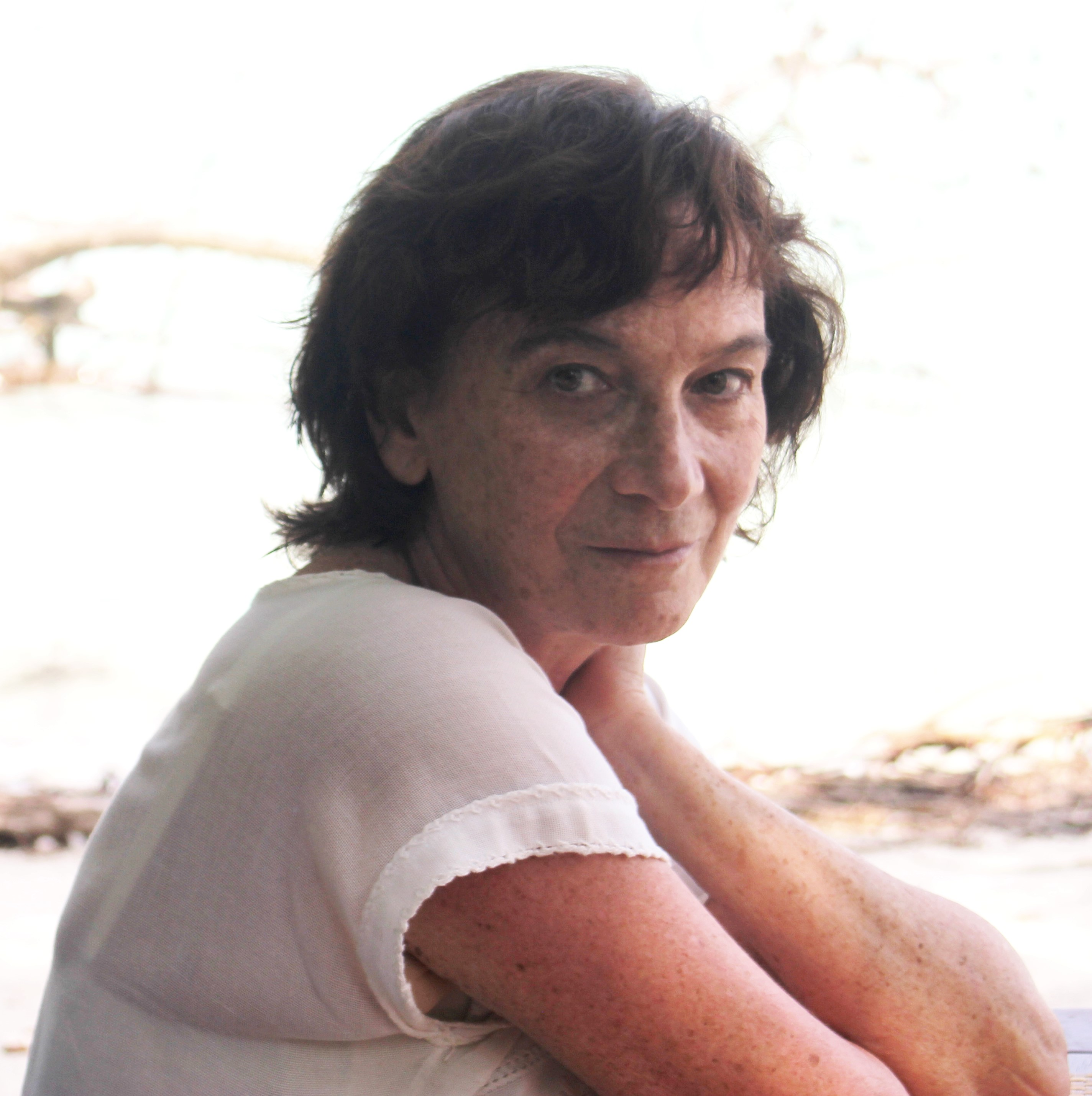

Patricia Ferreira (1958 – 27 December 2023) was a Spanish film and television director and screenwriter.

== Life and career ==
Patricia Ferreira was born in Madrid in 1958. She earned a licentiate degree on Image Sciences and Journalism from the Complutense University of Madrid. She joined TVE and RNE as a film journalist, and then she became involved with television production and writing at the Spanish public broadcaster. Her feature film directorial debut I Know Who You Are (2000) earned her a nomination to the Goya Award for Best New Director. It was followed by fiction features such as The Impatient Alchemist (2012) and The Wild Ones (2012), as well as documentaries and television series. She died in Madrid on 27 December 2023, at the age of 65.
