= Robert Newman (agent) =

Robert Newman is a motion picture literary agent and partner at William Morris Endeavor. He was previously head of International Creative Management’s motion picture literary department.

Robert is married to Cindy Karesky Newman and they reside in Los Angeles, CA. They have 5 children; Leah, Sara, Jenna, Emma and Beatrice Violet (adopted in 2022).
