= Arcibel's Game =

- Spanish: El juego de arcibel
- Directed by: Alberto Lecchi
- Written by: Daniel García Molt; Alberto Lecchi
- Produced by: Luis Sartor
- Starring: Darío Grandinetti; Juan Echanove; Juan Diego; Diego Torres; Vladimir Cruz; Rebecca Cobos; Alejandro Trejo; Bernard Blancan
- Cinematography: Hugo Colace
- Edited by: Alejandro Alem; Miguel Santamaría
- Music by: Iván Wyszogrod
- Distributed by: Distribution Company Sudamericana
- Release date: May 29, 2003
- Running time: 115 minutes
- Countries: Argentina; Spain
- Language: Spanish

Arcibel's Game (Spanish: El juego de Arcibel), is a 2003 drama film co-written and directed by Alberto Lecchi and starring Darío Grandinetti and Diego Torres, among others.

== Plot ==
1967: in Miranda, an imaginary Latin American country, ruled by the dictator General Abalorio, Arcibel Alegría (Darío Grandinetti), a journalist who writes articles about chess is taken to jail as political prisoner due to a mixed-up schedule of the newspaper he works for. Arcibel, a non-political, rather solitary person, separated, and father of a two-year-old girl, will get to know a new reality he's never heard of, from inside the jail.

Arcibel spends his time learning and, luckily for him, playing chess with Palacios, his cell neighbor. As time goes by, General Abalorio is elected president after democratic elections and all political prisoners are set free, except for Arcibel, who, due to a bureaucratic mess, will be confined to jail where the rest of the criminals are locked up.

The jail gets crowded with thieves and murderers. Pablo (Diego Torres), his new cellmate, hardly knows how to read or write and he definitely doesn't play chess. Despite Arcibel's efforts, Pablo doesn't learn a thing and therefore, Arcibel comes up with an idea. He invents a witty war game, of guerillas. In time Pablo becomes an expert. When he meets Rosalinda, Arcibel's daughter who is already in her twenties, he's touched. The day Pablo manages to beat Arcibel in the game, he runs away. Arcibel then has to undergo terrible punishments for keeping quiet about his cellmate's jailbreak. However, he holds out until time gives him another surprise. His game, Arcibel's game, is not a game anymore, it has become real, and the two leading players turn out to be no others than Pablo and his own daughter Rosalinda.
