= List of Walt Disney Studios Motion Pictures international films (2000–2009) =

The following list contains films which were distributed by Walt Disney Studios Motion Pictures internationally by all existing and defunct labels. This includes acquisitions as well as local-language releases.

All films listed are theatrical releases by Buena Vista International (until 2007) and Walt Disney Studios Motion Pictures International (2007 onwards) unless specified.

Release date	Title	Studio release label	Notes
January 6, 2000	Cóndor Crux	Buena Vista International	Argentine distribution only; Patagonik Film Group and Tornasol Films S.A.
January 23, 2000	Restless	Buena Vista International	Finnish distribution only; Solar Films
February 10, 2000	House on Haunted Hill	Buena Vista International	Australian, New Zealand and Italian distribution and German and Austrian theatrical co-distribution with Helkon Filmverleih only; Dark Castle Entertainment
March 3, 2000	A Charming Mass Suicide	Buena Vista International	Finnish theatrical distribution only; Ere Kokkonen Oy
March 3, 2000	The Next Best Thing	Buena Vista International	distribution in Latin America, the U.K., Ireland, Australia, New Zealand, South Africa, France, the Benelux, the Nordics and Japan only; Lakeshore Entertainment
March 24, 2000	One of the Hollywood Ten	Buena Vista International	Spanish theatrical distribution only; Morena Films
April 6, 2000	American Shrimps	Touchstone Pictures	German and Austrian distribution only; Pelemele Film and Leora Films
May 26, 2000	Passion of Mind	Buena Vista International	distribution in Latin America, the U.K., Ireland, Australia, New Zealand, South Africa, France, the Benelux and the Nordics only; Lakeshore Entertainment
June 8, 2000	Una noche con Sabrina Love	Buena Vista International	DMVB Films, L.C.J. Editions & Productions, Naya Films, PHF Films S.L., Patagonik Film Group, Surf Film and ULM
June 22, 2000	Tuvalu	Buena Vista International	German and Austrian distribution only; Veit Helmer Filmproduktion
July 22, 2000	The Boy Who Saw the Wind	Buena Vista International	Japanese distribution only; Brain's Base
August 17, 2000	Clams and Mussels	Buena Vista International	distribution only; Patagonik Film Group, Alma Ata International Pictures S.L., Antena 3, Millecento Cinema and Naya Films S.A.
August 22, 2000	Badding	Buena Vista International	Finnish distribution only; Fennada-Filmi
August 25, 2000	Bring It On	Buena Vista International	International distribution only; Universal Pictures and Beacon Pictures
August 31, 2000	Nine Queens	Buena Vista International	Argentine distribution only; Patagonik Film Group and Naya Films S.A.
September 1, 2000	Titus	Buena Vista International	U.K., Irish, Australian and New Zealand distribution only
September 8, 2000	Salsa	Buena Vista International	Spanish theatrical distribution only; Aurum Producciones, Sogecine,
October 6, 2000	Peter-No-Tail and the Great Treasure Hunt	Buena Vista International	Swedish distribution only; SVT Drama
October 12, 2000	Bless the Child	Buena Vista International	Australian, New Zealand and Latin American distribution only; Paramount Pictures, Icon Productions and Mace Neufeld Productions
October 19, 2000	Rules of Engagement	Buena Vista International	German and Austrian theatrical co-distribution with Helkon Filmverleih only; Seven Arts Pictures and Scott Rudin Productions
November 9, 2000	Where the Heart Is	Buena Vista International	German and Austrian theatrical co-distribution with Helkon Filmverleih only; Wind Dancer Films
November 24, 2000	Y decirte alguna estupidez, por ejemplo, te quiero	Buena Vista International	Spanish distribution only; José Frade Producciones Cinematográficas
November 30, 2000	Fandango	Buena Vista International	German and Austrian distribution only; Calypso Filmproduktion, Buena Vista International Film Production (Germany) and Bavaria Film
December 6, 2000	Babs	Buena Vista International	Dutch distribution only; The Kasander Film Company, Delux Productions and NPS
December 22, 2000	¡Ja me maaten...!	Buena Vista International	Spanish distribution only; Don Oriol Films and Televisión Española
January 12, 2001	Thirteen Days	Buena Vista International	U.K. and Irish distribution only; Beacon Pictures and Tig Productions
January 12, 2001	Rentun Ruusu	Buena Vista International	Finnish distribution only: Artista Filmi Oy
January 25, 2001	Baby Blue	Buena Vista International	Dutch distribution only; Shooting Star Filmcompany and VARA
February 16, 2001	Festival	Buena Vista International	Swedish distribution only
March 15, 2001	Venus and Mars	Buena Vista International	German and Austrian distribution only; Atlantis Film and Mitteldeutsches Filmkontor
March 22, 2001	The Wedding Planner	Buena Vista International	Latin American distribution and German and Austrian theatrical co-distribution with Helkon Filmverleih only; Intermedia Films, Tapestry Films, Dee Gee Entertainment, Prufrock Pictures
March 23, 2001	Heartbreakers	Buena Vista International	Latin American, Australian and New Zealand distribution only; Metro-Goldwyn-Mayer, Davis Entertainment and Winchester Films
April 11, 2001	Dungeons & Dragons	Buena Vista International	German and Austrian theatrical co-distribution with Helkon Filmverleih only; Behavior Worldwide, Silver Pictures and Sweetpea Entertainment
April 12, 2001	Memento	Buena Vista International	Australian and New Zealand distribution and German and Austrian theatrical co-distribution with Helkon Filmverleih only; Newmarket
April 19, 2001	A Goddamn Job	Buena Vista International	German and Austrian distribution only; Wüste Filmproduktion
May 4, 2001	Arian's Journey	Buena Vista International	Spanish distribution only; Montjuïc Entertainment
May 10, 2001	Drowning Mona	Buena Vista International	German and Austrian theatrical co-distribution only with Helkon Filmerleih; Neverland Films and Jersey Films
June 1, 2001	That Damned Rib	Buena Vista International	Spanish distribution only; ALMA ATA International Pictures, S.L., Argentina SONO-FILM SACI and Galiardo P.C., S.A.
July 6, 2001	Kiss of the Dragon	Buena Vista International	distribution in the Nordics, the Benelux, Latin America excluding Mexico, India, Hong Kong, Taiwan, Singapore and Thailand only; EuropaCorp, Canal+ and Current Entertainment
August 3, 2001	The Living Forest	Buena Vista International	Spanish distribution only; Dygra Films and Megatrix
August 16, 2001	The Mexican	Buena Vista International	German and Austrian theatrical co-distribution with Helkon Filmverleih only; DreamWorks Pictures and Newmarket
August 16, 2001	Son of the Bride	Buena Vista International	Argentine distribution only; Patagonik Film Group and Pol-ka
August 17, 2001	Captain Corelli's Mandolin	Miramax Films	U.K., Irish, Australian, New Zealand and Japanese distribution only; Universal Pictures, StudioCanal and Working Title Films
August 31, 2001	Jeepers Creepers	Miramax Films	Italian distribution only; American Zoetrope
September 6, 2001	Down	Buena Vista International	Dutch distribution only; First Floor Features and AVRO
September 20, 2001	Kommando Störtebeker	Buena Vista International	German theatrical distribution only; TFC Trickcompany Filmproduktion and CTL-UFA International
September 20, 2001	Morlang	Buena Vista International	Dutch distribution only; Phanta Vision Film International
September 28, 2001	Enigma	Miramax Films	U.K., Irish and Scandinavian distribution only; Broadway Video, Jagged Films, Senator Entertainment and Intermedia Films
October 4, 2001	The Gift	Buena Vista International	German and Austrian theatrical co-distribution with Helkon Filmverleih only; Lakeshore Entertainment and Alphaville
October 25, 2001	The Man Who Sued God	Buena Vista International	Australian and New Zealand distribution only
October 31, 2001	Mine Alone	Buena Vista International	Spanish distribution only; Star Line Productions
December 26, 2001	The Man Who Wasn't There	Buena Vista International	distribution in Latin America, Australia, New Zealand and South Africa only; Working Title Films and Mike Zoss Productions
December 28, 2001	Me and Morrison	Buena Vista International	Finnish distribution only; Artista-Filmi Oy
January 24, 2002	Tom & Thomas	Buena Vista International	Dutch distribution only; First Floor Features
February 1, 2002	K-PAX	Buena Vista International	distribution in Australia, New Zealand and Scandinavia only; Universal Pictures, Intermedia Films and Lawrence Gordon Productions
February 14, 2002	Brotherhood of the Wolf	Buena Vista International	German and Austrian theatrical co-distribution with Helkon Filmverleih only; Metropolitan Filmexport, StudioCanal, Davis Films and Eskwad
February 22, 2002	Dragonfly	Buena Vista International	International distribution outside the Nordics, Portugal, Angola, Mozambique, South Africa, Greece, Cyprus, Poland, Hungary, the CIS, Israel and Japan only; Spyglass Entertainment, Universal Pictures and Shady Acres Entertainment
March 21, 2002	Todas las azafatas van al cielo	Buena Vista International	Spanish and Argentine distribution only; Patagonik Film Group and BD Cine
March 28, 2002	Rollerball	Buena Vista International	German and Austrian theatrical distribution with Helkon Filmverleih only; Metro-Goldwyn-Mayer and Mosaic Media Group
April 10, 2002	Resident Evil	Buena Vista International	distribution in Australia, New Zealand and Scandinavia only; Constantin Film, Impact Pictures, Davis Films, New Legacy Film and Capcom
April 19, 2002	Lucky Break	Miramax Films	Australian and New Zealand distribution only; Fragile Films and Film4
May 2, 2002	Dark Blue World	Buena Vista International	German and Austrian theatrical co-distribution with Helkon Filmverleih only
May 9, 2002	2001: A Space Travesty	Buena Vista International	German and Austrian theatrical co-distribution with Helkon Filmverleih only; Jeffrey Konvitz Filmgroup
May 15, 2002	The Impatient Alchemist	Buena Vista International	Spanish distribution only; Patagonik Film Group, Tornasol Films, Continental and Cartel
May 24, 2002	Insomnia	Buena Vista International	distribution in the U.K., Ireland, Australia, New Zealand, the Benelux and Scandinavia only; Alcon Entertainment, Witt/Thomas Productions and Section Eight Productions
May 31, 2002	The Last Train	Buena Vista International	distribution only; Patagonik Film Group, OK Films, Rambla Producciones, Taxi Films, Telefe and Tornasol Films
June 6, 2002	Passionate People	Buena Vista International	Argentine distribution only; Patagonik Film Group, Argentina Sono Film, Alquimia Cinema, Antena 3, Telefe and Vía Digital
June 12, 2002	Semana Santa	Gaumont Buena Vista International	French distribution only; Schlemmer Film, Rai - Radiotelevisione Italiana and Wandering Star Pictures
June 27, 2002	The Contender	Buena Vista International	German and Austrian theatrical co-distribution with Helkon Filmverleih only; Cinerenta, Battleground Productions, SE8 Group and Cinecontender Productions
July 5, 2002	The Other Side of the Bed	Buena Vista International	Spanish distribution only; Impala and Telespan 2000
July 18, 2002	Dibu 3	Buena Vista International	Argentine distribution only; Patagonik Film Group
July 26, 2002	Phone	Buena Vista International	South Korean theatrical distribution only; Toilet Pictures
September 17, 2002	Kamchatka	Buena Vista International	Argentine distribution only; Patagonik Film Group, Alquimia Cinema, Oscar Kramer S.A., Televisión Española and Vía Digital
October 18, 2002	Abandon	Buena Vista International	international distribution outside Italy, the Nordics, Portugal, Angola, Mozambique, South Africa, Greece, Cyprus, Poland, Hungary, the CIS, Israel and Japan only; Spyglass Entertainment and Paramount Pictures
October 27, 2002	Klassfesten	Buena Vista International	Swedish distribution only; S/S Fladen Film
November 6, 2002	The Last Kiss	Gaumont Buena Vista International	French distribution only; Fandango and Medusa Film
November 17, 2002	Peter Bell	Buena Vista International	Benelux distribution only; Shooting Star Filmcompany and Katholieke Radio Omroep
January 17, 2003	The Witch Affair	Buena Vista International	Spanish distribution only; Alma Ata International Pictures S.L., Taznia Media and Televisión Española
January 17, 2003	Bad Boys	Buena Vista International	Finnish distribution only; Solar Films
March 13, 2003	You Can't Stop the Murders	Miramax Films	Australian and New Zealand distribution only
March 14, 2003	The Hunted	Buena Vista International	distribution in Latin America, the Benelux, Australia and New Zealand only; Paramount Pictures, Lakeshore Entertainment and Alphaville Films
April 25, 2003	It Runs in the Family	Buena Vista International	International distribution only; Metro-Goldwyn-Mayer and Furthur Films
May 14, 2003	Cowboys & Angels	Buena Vista International	Ireland distribution only; Wide Eye Films, Peter Stockhaus Filmproduktion and Grosvenor Park Productions
May 22, 2003	Horseplay	Buena Vista International	Australian and New Zealand distribution only
May 23, 2003	Bruce Almighty	Buena Vista International	international distribution outside the Nordics, Portugal, Angola, Mozambique, South Africa, Greece, Cyprus, Poland, Hungary, the Baltics, the CIS, Israel, Japan, free television in Italy, San Marino, Vatican City and Monte Carlo and television in Spain, Andorra and Gibraltar only; Spyglass Entertainment, Universal Pictures, Shady Acres and Pit Bull Productions
June 14, 2003	Vivir intentando	Buena Vista International	Argentine distribution only
June 26, 2003	In the City Without Limits	Buena Vista International	Argentine distribution only; Warner Sogefilms, Patagonik Film Group, Icónica and Zebra Producciones
July 7, 2003	Seabiscuit	Buena Vista International	international distribution outside Germany, Austria, Switzerland, Spain, the Nordics, Portugal, Angola, Mozambique, South Africa, Greece, Cyprus, Poland, Hungary, the Baltics, the CIS, Israel and Japan only; Spyglass Entertainment, Universal Pictures, DreamWorks Pictures and The Kennedy/Marshall Company
September 3, 2003	Two Tough Guys	Buena Vista International	Spanish distribution only; Ensueño Films, Zebra Producciones and Impala
September 12, 2003	The Middle of the World	Buena Vista International	Brazilian distribution only; Miravista, Globo Filmes, LC Barreto and Filmes do Equador
September 12, 2003	Once Upon a Time in Mexico	Dimension Films	International theatrical distribution outside Japan and India only; Columbia Pictures and Troublemaker Studios
September 18, 2003	Ready, Steady, Charlie!	Buena Vista International	Swiss theatrical distribution only; Zodiac Pictures
September 19, 2003	Football Days	Buena Vista International	Spanish distribution only; Telespan 2000 and Estudios Picasso
October 2, 2003	The Wild Soccer Bunch	Buena Vista International	German, Austrian and Dutch distribution only; SamFilm
October 16, 2003	Baltic Storm	Buena Vista International	German and Austrian theatrical distribution only; Top Story Filmproduction and Smile Entertainment
October 25, 2003	Tears of the Sun	Buena Vista International	Japanese theatrical distribution only; Revolution Studios and Cheyenne Enterprises
October 31, 2003	The 4th Floor	Buena Vista International	Spanish distribution only; BocaBoca Producciones, Televisión Española and Canal+
November 12, 2003	Remember Me, My Love	Gaumont Buena Vista International	French distribution only; Fandango, Vice Versa Film and Medusa Film
November 14, 2003	Master and Commander: The Far Side of the World	Miramax Films	Japanese theatrical and Italian distribution only; 20th Century Fox, Universal Pictures and Samuel Goldwyn Films
December 10, 2003	Ladies' Night	Buena Vista International	Mexican distribution only; Miravista, Videocine and Argos Comunicación
December 18, 2003	Peter Bell II: The Hunt for the Czar Crown	Buena Vista International	Dutch distribution only; Shooting Star Filmcompany and Katholieke Radio Omroep
December 25, 2003	Illusive Tracks	Buena Vista International	Swedish distribution only; S/S Fladen Film
January 16, 2004	Addiction	Buena Vista International	Finnish distribution only: Artista Filmi Oy
January 24, 2004	Hollywood Homicide	Buena Vista International	Japanese theatrical distribution only; Revolution Studios and Pitt/Shelton Productions
January 31, 2004	Dog Nail Clipper	Buena Vista International	Finnish distribution only
February 13, 2004	Kill Me Tender	Buena Vista International	Spanish distribution only; Star Line TV
February 27, 2004	House of Sand and Fog	Miramax Films	U.K. and Irish distribution only; Cobalt Media Group and Bisgrove Entertainment
March 5, 2004	Beyond the Front Line	Buena Vista International	distribution only; Åke Lindman Film-Production
March 5, 2004	Starsky & Hutch	Dimension Films	International distribution only; Warner Bros. Pictures, Weed Road Pictures and Red Hour Films
April 22, 2004	Sternenberg	Buena Vista International	Swiss distribution only; Langfilm and Schweizer Fernsehen
July 28, 2004	Garden State	Miramax Films	International distribution outside Eastern Europe, the CIS, the Middle East, Israel and Asia only; Camelot Pictures, Jersey Films and Double Feature Films
July 30, 2004	Bunshinsaba	Buena Vista International	South Korean theatrical distribution only; Mirovision and A-Post Pictures
September 24, 2004	The Motorcycle Diaries	Buena Vista International	Latin American distribution only; Film4 Productions, BD Cine and Wildwood Enterprises, Inc
October 7, 2004	Guys and Balls	Buena Vista International	German and Austrian distribution only; Hager Moss Film, Medienfonds GFP and RTL
October 7, 2004	Deuda	Buena Vista International	Argentine distribution only; Patagonik Film Group
December 10, 2004	The Ring Thing	Buena Vista International	Swiss theatrical distribution only; Elevator Group and Condor Films
December 23, 2004	Around the World in 80 Days	Buena Vista International	German distribution only; Walden Media and Spanknyce Films
January 14, 2005	Frozen Land	Buena Vista International	Finnish distribution only
January 26, 2005	March of the Penguins	Buena Vista International	French distribution only; Bonne Pioche and Wild Bunch
February 17, 2005	The Wild Soccer Bunch 2	Buena Vista International	German and Austrian distribution only; SamFilm
March 18, 2005	Romeo and Juliet Get Married	Buena Vista International	Brazilian distribution only; Globo Filmes
March 31, 2005	Barefoot	Touchstone Pictures	German and Austrian distribution only; Barefoot Films and Mr. Brown Entertainment
June 2, 2005	Sahara	Buena Vista International	German and Austrian theatrical co-distribution with Universum Film only; Bristol Bay Productions, Walden Media, Baldwin Entertainment Group and Kanzaman Productions
June 3, 2005	Cinderella Man	Touchstone Pictures	International distribution only; Universal Pictures, Miramax Films, Imagine Entertainment and Parkway Productions
June 24, 2005	El Calentito	Buena Vista International	Spanish distribution only; Telespan 2000 and Estudios Picasso
September 9, 2005	Shadow of the Eagle	Buena Vista International	Finnish distribution only; Artista-Filmi
September 15, 2005	The Aura	Buena Vista International	Latin American distribution only; Patagonik Film Group, Davis Films and Tornasol Films
September 16, 2005	The Absent	Buena Vista International	Spanish theatrical distribution only; Estudios Picasso and Star Line Productions
October 1, 2005	Goal!	Buena Vista International	international distribution outside Australia, New Zealand, Germany, Austria and Japan only; Milkshake Films
October 6, 2005	Johan	Buena Vista International	Dutch distribution only; Egmond Film and Television and VARA
November 4, 2005	Camarón: When Flamenco Became Legend	Buena Vista International	Spanish distribution only; Monoria Films and Filmanova Invest
November 11, 2005	Derailed	Miramax Films	International distribution only; The Weinstein Company and Di Bonaventura Pictures
November 30, 2005	Es ist ein Elch entsprungen	Buena Vista International	German, Austrian and Dutch distribution only; SamFilm
December 9, 2005	Memoirs of a Geisha	Buena Vista International	U.K. and Irish under Miramax Films and Japanese co-distribution with Shochiku only; Columbia Pictures, DreamWorks Pictures, Spyglass Entertainment, Amblin Entertainment and Red Wagon Entertainment
December 21, 2005	The 2 Sides of the Bed	Buena Vista International	Spanish distribution only; Telespan Producciones, Estudios Picasso and Impala
December 25, 2005	Mrs Henderson Presents	Miramax Films	Latin American, German and Austrian distribution only; BBC Films, Pathé and Future Films
December 30, 2005	The Matador	Miramax Films	U.K., Irish, Australian, New Zealand, German and Austrian distribution only; Stratus Film Company, DEJ Productions, Syndicate Films International, Irish DreamTime, Furst Films and Equity Pictures
January 13, 2006	Every Other Week	Buena Vista International	Swedish distribution only; S/S Fladen
March 2, 2006	The Wild Soccer Bunch 3	Buena Vista International	German and Austrian distribution only; SamFilm
March 23, 2006	The Lives of Others	Buena Vista International	German and Austrian distribution only; Wiedemann & Berg Film Production, Bayerischer Rundfunk, Arte and Creado Film
March 23, 2006	Bolletjes Blues	Buena Vista International	Dutch theatrical distribution only; Dutch Mountain Movies
April 14, 2006	Scary Movie 4	Miramax Films	International distribution only; The Weinstein Company, Dimension Films and Brad Grey Pictures
May 11, 2006	Asterix and the Vikings	Buena Vista International	German and Austrian theatrical co-distribution with Universum Film only; SND Films, Mandarin Films and A. Film Production
July 13, 2006	The Hairy Tooth Fairy	Buena Vista International	distribution only; Patagonik Film Group and Filmax Animation
August 31, 2006	48 Shades	Buena Vista International	Australian and New Zealand distribution only
August 31, 2006	Bandidas	Buena Vista International	German and Austrian theatrical co-distribution with Universum Film only; EuropaCorp, TF1 Films Production
September 8, 2006	Hollywoodland	Miramax Films	International distribution only; Focus Features and Back Lot Pictures
September 15, 2006	Only God Knows	Buena Vista International	Latin American distribution only; Miravista
September 21, 2006	Crank	Buena Vista International	German and Austrian theatrical co-distribution with Universum Film only; Lionsgate, Lakeshore Entertainment and Radical Media
September 28, 2006	Remake	Buena Vista International	Argentine distribution only; Warner Bros. Pictures, Ovideo and Patagonik Film Group
October 20, 2006	Kalteva torni	Buena Vista International	Finnish distribution only; Artista-Filmi Oy
October 27, 2006	Saw III	Buena Vista International	Latin American and Spanish distribution only; Lionsgate and Twisted Pictures
October 31, 2006	Salvatore - Questa è la vita	Buena Vista International	Italian distribution only; Globe Films and The Walt Disney Company Italia
November 2, 2006	The Year My Parents Went on Vacation	Buena Vista International	Brazilian distribution only; Miravista, Gullane Filmes, Caos Produções, Globo Filmes, Lereby, Teleimage and Locall
November 17, 2006	Frozen City	Buena Vista International	Finnish distribution only; Solar Films
December 20, 2006	Tired of Kissing Frogs	Buena Vista International	Mexican distribution only; Miravista, Bazooka Films and Santo Domingo Films
December 21, 2006	Curse of the Golden Flower	Buena Vista International	Singaporean, Taiwanese, Indonesian and Malaysian distribution only; Edko Films and Film Partner International
January 12, 2007	V2: Dead Angel	Buena Vista International	Finnish distribution only; Solar Films
January 26, 2007	Breaking and Entering	Miramax Films	International distribution only; The Weinstein Company and Mirage Enterprises
February 2, 2007	The Wild Soccer Bunch 4	Buena Vista International	German and Austrian distribution only; SamFilm
February 8, 2007	Blind	Buena Vista International	Dutch distribution only; Phanta Vision Film International, MMG Film & TV Production and Klas Film
February 9, 2007	Goal II: Living the Dream	Buena Vista International	international distribution outside Australia, New Zealand, Germany, Austria and Japan only; Milkshake Films
February 16, 2007	Monica's Gang in an Adventure in Time	Buena Vista International	Brazilian distribution only; Mauricio de Sousa Produções, Diler & Associados, Labocine Digital and Miravista
March 23, 2007	I Want Candy	Buena Vista International	U.K. and Irish distribution only; Ealing Studios, Thema SA, Grosvenor Park Productions, Sky Movies and Fragile Films
April 6, 2007	Caixa Dois	Buena Vista International	Brazilian distribution only; Miravista, Globo Filmes, LC Barreto & Filmes do Equador and Movi&Art
June 29, 2007	Love Expresso	Buena Vista International	Spanish distribution only; Drive Cine and Estudios Picasso
July 5, 2007	Noah's Ark	Buena Vista International	Argentine distribution only; Patagonik Film Group
August 13, 2007	The Signal	Buena Vista International	Argentine distribution only; Patagonik Film Group
August 31, 2007	Hallam Foe	Buena Vista International	U.K. and Irish distribution only; The Film Factory, Ingenious Film Partners, Glasgow Film Office, STV, Scottish Screen and Sigma Films
September 21, 2007	And Who Are You?	Buena Vista International	Spanish distribution only; Mono Films and Irusoin
September 24, 2007	Lust, Caution	Buena Vista International	Singaporean, Taiwanese, Indonesian and Malaysian distribution only; Focus Features, River Road Entertainment, Haishang Films, Edko Films, Shanghai Film Group and Sil-Metropole Organization
October 5, 2007	Mr. Brooks	Buena Vista International	Italian distribution only; Relativity Media, Eden Rock Media, Tig Productions and Element Films
October 5, 2007	And When Did You Last See Your Father?	Buena Vista International	U.K. and Irish distribution only; Film4, UK Film Council, EM Media, Tiger Aspect Productions and Irish Film Board
October 31, 2007	The First Cry	Buena Vista International	French distribution only; Mai Juin Productions, M6 Films, Wild Bunch, Canal+ and TPS Star
October 31, 2007	The Three Investigators and the Secret of Skeleton Island	Buena Vista International	German and Austrian distribution only; Studio Hamburg International Produktion
November 29, 2007	The Fox and the Child	Buena Vista International	French distribution only; Bonne Pioche, Canal+, France 3 Cinéma and Wild Bunch
December 26, 2007	There Will Be Blood	Miramax Films	International distribution only; Paramount Vantage and Ghoulardi Film Company
January 2, 2008	Three in Love (Kolmistaan)	Buena Vista International	Finnish distribution only; Petfilms Oy
March 19, 2008	This Night Is Still Ours	Buena Vista International	Italian distribution only; Italian International Film and The Walt Disney Company Italia
April 3, 2008	Hardcover	Buena Vista International	German and Austrian theatrical co-distribution with Universum Film only; Little Shark Entertainment, WDR, Arte and GFP
April 17, 2008	Sommer	Buena Vista International	German and Austrian distribution only; SamFilm
May 9, 2008	Casual Day	Buena Vista International	Spanish distribution only; Monfort Producciones, Telecinco Cinema and Videntia Frames
July 17, 2008	High School Musical: el desafío	Walt Disney Pictures	Argentine distribution only; Patagonik Film Group, The Walt Disney Company (Argentina) S.A. and Artear Argentina
August 14, 2008	A Boyfriend for My Wife	Buena Vista International	distribution only; Patagonik Film Group
August 15, 2008	Stormheart	Buena Vista International	Finnish distribution only; Stormheart Oy
August 22, 2008	Cape No. 7	Buena Vista International	Taiwanese distribution only
September 5, 2008	High School Musical: el desafío	Walt Disney Pictures	Mexican distribution only; Patagonik Film Group, The Walt Disney Company (México) S.A. and TV Azteca
September 12, 2008	King of the Hill	Buena Vista International	Spanish distribution only; Goodfellas, Decontrabando and Telecinco Cinema
September 17, 2008	The Seven of Daran: Battle of Pareo Rock	Buena Vista International	Dutch distribution only; AAA Pictures
October 10, 2008	Santos	Buena Vista International	Spanish distribution only; Boomerang Cine, Telecinco Cinema and Sobras Producciones
November 19, 2008	J'irai dormir à Hollywood	Buena Vista International	French distribution only; Bonne Pioche and Cinémage 2
December 25, 2008	Prime Time	Buena Vista International	Spanish distribution only; Kino PC and The Night of the Cats
January 8, 2009	Transporter 3	Buena Vista International	German and Austrian theatrical co-distribution with Universum Film and Telepool only; EuropaCorp, TF1 Films Production, Grive Productions, Apipoulaï Prod and Current Entertainment
February 19, 2009	King Guillaume	Buena Vista International	French distribution only; MACT Productions and Cinémage 3
February 19, 2009	Lilly the Witch: The Dragon and the Magic Book	Walt Disney Pictures	German, Austrian, Spanish and Italian distribution only; blue eyes Fiction, Trixter, Dor Film, Steinweg Emotion Pictures, Classic, Buena Vista International Film Production (Germany) and Babelsberg Film
February 27, 2009	Rally On!	Buena Vista International	Finnish distribution only; Suomen Filmiteollisuus Oy
March 3, 2009	The Secret of Kells	Buena Vista International	Irish distribution only; Les Armateurs, Vivi Film, Cartoon Saloon and France 2 Cinéma
March 13, 2009	Los muertos van deprisa	Buena Vista International	Spanish theatrical distribution only
March 19, 2009	Two Fists, One Heart	Buena Vista International	Australian and New Zealand distribution only
March 19, 2009	The Three Investigators and the Secret of Terror Castle	Buena Vista International	German and Austrian distribution only
April 16, 2009	Crank: High Voltage	Buena Vista International	German and Austrian theatrical co-distribution with Universum Film only; Lakeshore Entertainment and Radical Media
August 6, 2009	Dad for a Day	Buena Vista International	Argentine distribution only; INCAA, Telefe, Pampa Films, Royal Cinema Group and Runa Films
August 20, 2009	Subdivision	Buena Vista International	Australian and New Zealand distribution only
September 10, 2009	Twisted Roots	Buena Vista International	Finnish distribution only; Edith Film OY
September 30, 2009	SpangaS op Survival	Walt Disney Pictures	Dutch distribution only; Nijenhuis & de Levita Film & TV and NCRV
September 30, 2009	The Assailant	Buena Vista International	Brazilian distribution only; Miravista, Globo Filmes, Mixer Films, RT2A Produções Cinematográficas and Teleimage
October 1, 2009	Gangs	Buena Vista International	German and Austrian distribution only; SamFilm
October 29, 2009	The Book of Masters	Walt Disney Pictures	Russian distribution only; The Walt Disney Company CIS and Trite
December 25, 2009	Happy Ever Afters	Buena Vista International	Ireland distribution only; Newgrange Pictures Ltd, Irish Film Board, Filmstiftung NRW and Films Distributions

== See also ==
- List of Disney feature-length home entertainment releases
- List of Disney television films
- List of Disney+ original films
- List of Hollywood Pictures films
- List of Lucasfilm productions
- List of Marvel Studios films
- List of Searchlight Pictures films
- List of 20th Century Studios films
- List of Touchstone Pictures films
- List of Walt Disney Pictures films
- Category:Lists of films by studio
