= List of Argentine films of 2002 =

A list of films produced in Argentina in 2002:

Argentine films of 2002
Title	Director	Release	Genre
A - B
Apasionados	Juan José Jusid		
Las aventuras de Dios	Eliseo Subiela		
Bahía mágica	Marina Valentini		
Bolivia	Israel Adrián Caetano		
El bonaerense	Pablo Trapero		
C - D
Cacería	Ezio Massa		
Casi ángeles	Vanessa Erfurth/ Carolina Suárez/ Mario Borgna/ Manuel Tello/ Leonel Compagnet		
Caja negra	Luis Ortega		
El Chevrolé	Leonardo Ricagni		
Chúmbale	Aníbal Di Salvo		
Corazón de fuego	Diego Arsuaga		
Cortázar: apuntes para un documental	Eduardo Montes Bradley		
El cumple	Gustavo Postiglione		
El descanso	Ulises Rosell/ Rodrigo Moreno/ Andrés Tambornino		
Dibu 3, la gran aventura	Raúl Rodríguez Peila		
E - I
La entrega	Inés de Oliveira Cézar		
Estrella del sur	Luis Nieto		
La fe del volcán	Ana Poliak		
Herencia	Paula Hernández		
Historias mínimas	Carlos Sorín		
I love you... Torito	Edmund Valladares		
J - O
Kamchatka	Marcelo Piñeyro		
Las Palmas, Chaco	Alejandro Fernández Mouján		
Luca Vive	Jorge Coscia		
Lugares comunes	Adolfo Aristarain		
Los malditos caminos	Luis Barone		
Marechal, o la batalla de los ángeles	Gustavo Fontán		
Matanza	Nicolás Batlle, Rubén Delgad, Sebastián Menéndez y Emiliano Penelas		
Mataperros	Gabriel Arregui		
Mercano, el marciano	Juan Antín		Animated
Micaela, una film mágica	Rosanna Manfredi		
Ni vivo, ni muerto	Víctor Jorge Ruiz		
Noche en la terraza	Jorge Zima		
No dejaré que no me quieras	José Luis Acosta		
No sabe, no contesta o NS/NC	Fernando Musa		
P - S
Peluca y Marisita	Raúl Perrone		
Los porfiados	Mariano Torres Manzur		
Sábado	Juan Villegas		
Samy y yo	Eduardo Milewicz		
Sabés nadar?	Diego Kaplan		
T - Z
Temporal	Carlos Orgambide		
Todas las azafatas van al cielo	Daniel Burman		
Tres pájaros	Carlos Jaureguialzo		
Un día de suerte	Sandra Gugliotta		
Un oso rojo	Israel Adrián Caetano		
Vagón fumador	Verónica Chen		
Vidas privadas	Fito Páez		
¿Y dónde está el bebé?	Pedro Stocki		

== See also ==
- 2002 in Argentina

== External links and references ==
- Argentine films of 2002 at the Internet Movie Database
