= Gondola (film) =

2023 feature film by Veit Helmer

- Directed by: Veit Helmer
- Screenplay by: Veit Helmer
- Produced by: Veit Helmer, Ziako Abesadze
- Starring: Mathilde Irrmann; Nino Soselia; Suka Papuashvili
- Cinematography: Goga Devdariani
- Edited by: Iordanis Karaisaridis, Moritz Geiser
- Music by: Malcolm Arison, Sóley
- Distributed by: Coccinelle Film
- Release date: October 23, 2023 (Tokyo)
- Running time: 85 miutes
- Countries: Germany, Georgia
- Language: no dialogue

Gondola is a 2023 feature film directed by Veit Helmer.

== Plot summary ==
After the death of her father, young Iva returns to a small village in a valley in the Georgian mountains and takes a job as a conductor on a small mountain railway. There she meets her colleague Nino. Every half hour the gondolas cross between the mountain and the valley, and a playful romance gradually develops between the two women. It begins with furtive glances and develops into special ideas such as water fights, costume dressing up and a romantic evening. The boss observes this friendship with suspicion, as he himself tries in vain to get closer to Nino. When Nino can no longer hide her plans to work as a stewardess for an airline from Iva, a conflict arises between the two, which is, however, again resolved playfully.

== Production ==
Helmer had previously directed films such as Tuvalu, Absurdistan, and The Bra that contained little or no dialogue. Helmer also constructed Gondola as a sound film without dialogue.

== Cast ==
- Mathilde Irrmann as Iva
- Nino Soselia as Nino
- Suka Papuaschwili as Chef

== Critical reception ==
Britta Schmeis of epd Film gave the film 4 of 5 stars and opened with "Ohne ein einziges Wort erzählt Veit Helmer eine poetisch-märchenhafte Liebesgeschichte, die sich nahezu auf nur zwei Seilbahngondeln beschränkt. [Without a single word, Veit Helmer tells a poetic, fairytale love story that is almost limited to just two cable car gondolas.]"

Wendy Ide of Screen Daily described the film as a "quirky, dialogue-free romance from German director Veit Helmer. It is an appealing trifle – undeniably lovely to look at – but even at a brisk 82 minutes in length, feels like a short film idea stretched to feature length."

Falk Straub of Spielfilm rated the film 4 of 5 stars and concluded "Keiner macht Filme wie Veit Helmer. Die jüngste nonverbale Verrücktheit des in Berlin lebenden Regisseurs lotet die Liebe im Vorbeifahren aus. "Gondola" ist eine ebenso einfallsreiche wie heitere wie kunstvoll in Szene gesetzte Romanze; ein Film wie ein Gedicht, pure Seilbahnpoesie! [Nobody makes films like Veit Helmer. The Berlin-based director's latest non-verbal madness explores love as it passes by. Gondola is a romance that is as imaginative as it is cheerful and artfully staged; a film like a poem, pure cable car poetry!]"

Michael Meyns of Filmstarts gave the film 1 of 5 stars and ended his reiview with "Auch in „Gondola“ versucht Veit Helmer eine magische, poetische Liebesgeschichte zu erzählen, die er diesmal sogar ohne Worte inszeniert. Doch gerade diese Sprachlosigkeit macht die fragwürdige Weise umso sichtbarer, mit der er fremde Kulturen und Menschen für seine Zwecke benutzt – ein kolonialer Blick, der im 21. Jahrhundert einfach nicht mehr akzeptabel erscheint. [In Gondola Veit Helmer also tries to tell a magical, poetic love story, which he even stages without words this time. But it is precisely this speechlessness that makes the questionable way in which he uses foreign cultures and people for his own purposes all the more visible - a colonial view that simply no longer seems acceptable in the 21st century.]"

Frank Brenner of choices wrote that "Kaum ein anderer Filmemacher versteht es dermaßen gut, visuell zu erzählen. Hinzu kommt, dass Helmer in dieser poetisch-romantischen Liebesgeschichte eine märchenhafte Welt kreiert, die geradezu überquillt vor kindlichem Einfallsreichtum, was den Film universell verständlich und liebenswert macht. [Hardly any other filmmaker understands how to tell a story visually as well. In addition, Helmer creates a fairytale world in this poetic, romantic love story that is overflowing with childlike ingenuity, which makes the film universally understandable and lovable.]"
