= Little Mouse =

Little Mouse may refer to:

- A small mouse
- The Little Mouse, a Francophone fairy tale, partly similar to that of the Tooth Fairy
- "Little Mouse", a parody music video from the British TV series Look Around You
- The Vain Little Mouse, a folk tale
