= The Vain Little Mouse =

The Vain Little Mouse (Spanish: La Ratita Presumida) is a folktale about a little mouse and her many suitors.

== Variants ==
There are many variants of this tale. In some versions of the tale, the she-mouse is seduced by the answer of the cat, who sweetly meows when asked what he will do at night. In this version the she-mouse marries the cat, and she is usually eaten by the cat on the wedding night, though not always.

Other variants have a third part in which the he-mouse falls into a broth and dies, and even there is a fourth part, in which all the friends of the she-mouse harm themselves somehow describing their actions with a jingle, because they feel sorry for her. Each of these characters increase the seriousness of their self-destructive actions, singing a different jingle, but with parallelisms with the previous one.

The main character of the story can also have different representations, such as a fox or a little ant or a little cockroach.

== Origin ==
This tale seems to have been originated in the oral tradition and later moved to a literary form. Again, its literary form may have given birth to different variations. The earliest reference to this tale is found in Fernán Caballero's Lágrimas (1839) and La Gaviota (1856), but the complete tale is not written until later, in her compilation of tales Cuentos, oraciones, adivinanzas y refranes populares (1877). In this early version, the little she-mouse is actually a little ant, but she still marries a mouse, called Ratón Pérez. This little mouse ("ratón" in Spanish), would later inspire Padre Coloma, who would make him part of the Spanish traditional folklore by turning him into a sort of Tooth Fairy.

Fernán Caballero's version has the four parts explained in the previous section. The third and the fourth parts have a strong parallelism with the English Fairy Tale Titty Mouse and Tatty Mouse, first collected in Joseph Jacobs English Fairy Tales (1890). Joseph Jacobs found 25 variants of the same droll scattered over the world from India to Spain, and discusses various theories of its origin.

A second literary reference can be found in Carmen Lyra's Cuentos de mi tía Panchita (1920), in which, although she acknowledges it to be the same tale as Fernán Caballero's, she also leaves room for an oriental or African origin. In fact, the tale is titled La Cucarachita Mandinga (Mandinga, the Little Roach) and Mandinga is just another name for the Mandinka people. This leads to believe of some influences from the slaves brought from Africa. The tales of the book became part of the Costa Rican folklore, but the Little Roach is also known in Cuba, Mexico and Panama. In Panama, it became even more important as it is an important part of Panamanian folklore after it was turned into a children's theater play by Rogelio Sinán and with music of Gonzalo Brenes.

In some versions, the cockroach is not Mandinga, but Mondinga and in the Cuban and Caribbean version it seems to be Martina. Additionally, the representation of the main character can also change from country to country, probably depending on the greater influence of Carmen Lyra or Fernán Caballero. Puerto Rican Pura Belpré's version (as told to her by her grandmother) was the first one published in the US, translated as Perez and Martina: a Puerto Rican Folktale (1932). In 1936 Saturnino Calleja published another version La hormiguita se quiere casar, in which the mouse in saved from the broth by the little ant.

There are a couple of contemporary versions that are worth mentioning, since they can easily be found in children's bookstores: Daniel Moreton's version (La Cucaracha Martina: a Caribbean folktale), which seems to take root in Belpre's version and Joe Hayes' version, which has replaced the roach with a butterfly in his tale Mariposa: the butterfly or Mariposa Mariposa: the happy tale of La Mariposa the butterfly

== Educational value ==
The structure of this tale makes it suitable for personalization and adaptation to the particular children hearing it. It's also useful teaching kids about animals and their different sounds. Danger can be taught to be associated to objects by mentioning objects that can harm them or things they shouldn't play with.
