= Sitora Farmonova =

Uzbek film actress, singer, and comedian

Sitora Farmonova Ситора Фармонова
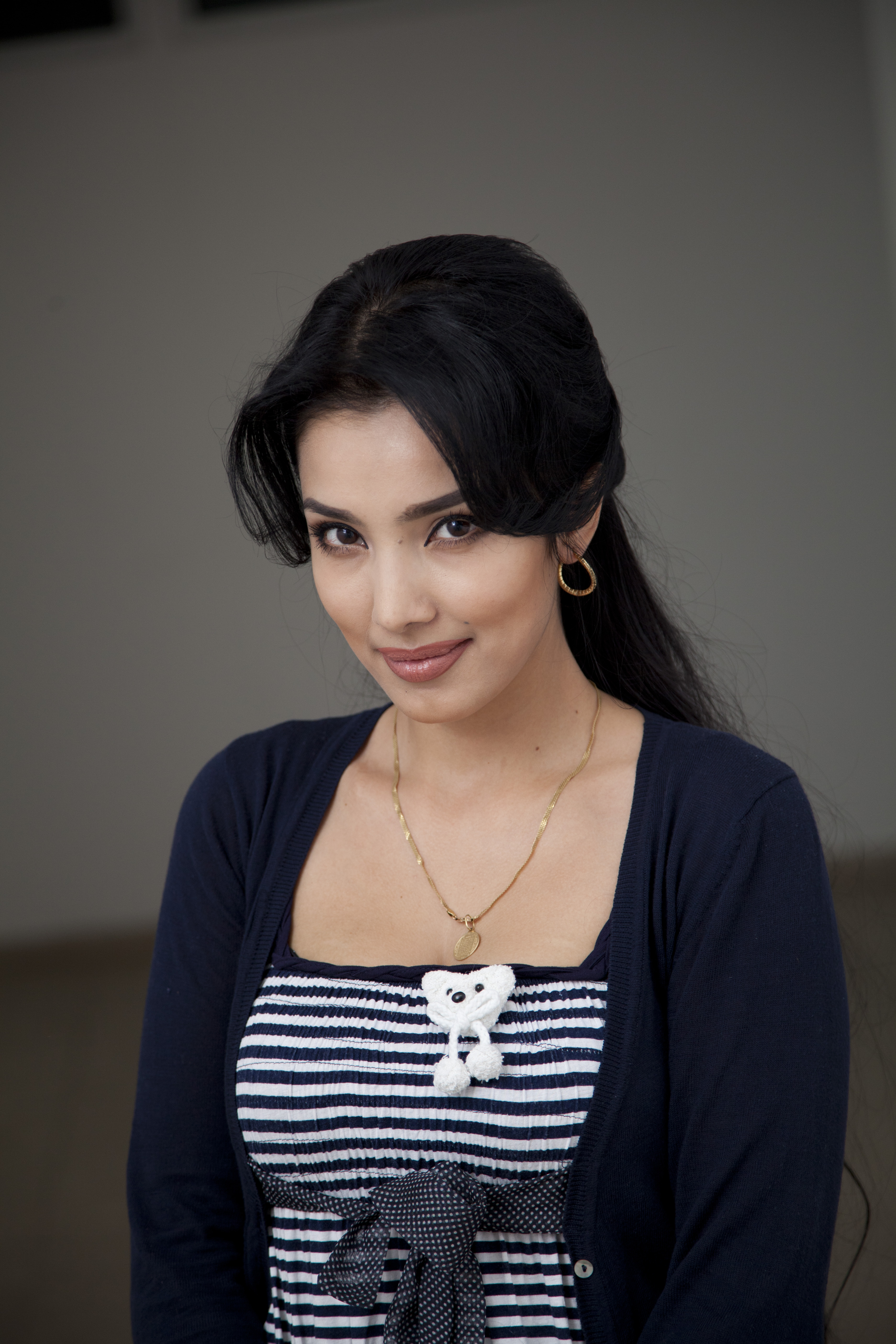
- Sitora Farmonova during the shooting of the TV series Общага (The Dorm)

Background information
- Birth name: Sitora Farmonova
- Born: 20 August 1984 (age 41)
- Origin: Bukhara, Uzbek SSR, USSR
- Genres: pop
- Occupation(s): Film actress, singer, and comedian
- Years active: 2000–present

Sitora Farmonova (Uzbek: Sitora Farmonova, Ситора Фармонова) is an Uzbek film actress, singer, and comedian. She rose to prominence within the Uzbek film industry with her roles in several Uzbek comedy films, such as Xavfli burilish (A Dangerous Turn) (2004), Mening akam boʻydoq! (My Brother is a Bachelor!) (2011), and Endi dadam boʻydoq? (Now My Father is a Bachelor?) (2013). Farmonova is also known for starring in the 2011 film Baikonur directed by Veit Helmer. She is the first Uzbek actress to star in a movie produced by a German filmmaker.

Farmonova has also launched a successful singing career. She achieved notability in Uzbekistan with her debut single "Bahor-kuz" ("Spring-Fall"). The song received positive reviews from both fans and critics upon its release.

Since 2015 Farmonova has been participating in KVN, a Russian humor TV show and competition, as a member of the Bishkek-based team Азия Микс (Asia MIX). In July 2016, Farmonova faced criticism for "making fun of the Uzbek people" during one of the episodes of the show. This led to the suspension of Farmonova's license by Uzbeknavo, Uzbekistan's government agency that issues licenses to performers.

== Life ==
Sitora Farmonova was born on 20 August 1984, in Bukhara. Her family moved to Tashkent when she was 13. She has two siblings, a younger brother and a younger sister.

== Career ==
A graduate of Uzbekistan State Institute of Arts and Culture, Sitora Farmonova has appeared in several films by Uzbek, Kazakh, and Kyrgyz filmmakers. She rose to prominence within the Uzbek film industry with her roles in several popular Uzbek comedy films, such as Xavfli burilish (A Dangerous Turn) (2004), Mening akam boʻydoq! (My Brother is a Bachelor!) (2011), and Endi dadam boʻydoq? (Now My Father is a Bachelor?) (2013).

Farmonova achieved some international recognition after acting in the 2011 film Baikonur directed by Veit Helmer. She is the first Uzbek actress to star in a movie produced by a German filmmaker. In Baikonur, Farmonova portrays Nazira, a resident of a small village near the Baikonur space station in Kazakhstan who falls in love with the main character Iskandar, a young Kazakh ham radio operator and space fanatic calling himself Gagarin after the Soviet cosmonaut.

Farmonova also appeared in the 2013 TV series Общага (The Dorm) that was shot in Kyrgyzstan. The series received positive reviews and Farmonova gained notability in Kyrgyzstan.

Farmonova has also launched a successful singing career. She achieved notability in Uzbekistan with her debut single "Bahor-kuz" ("Spring-Fall"), a duet with the Uzbek singer Mirjamol. The song received positive reviews from both fans and critics upon its release. Her duet song with the Kyrgyz singer Mirbek Atabekov "Эки журок/Ikki yurak" ("Two Hearts") was among the songs included in the soundtrack for the TV series Общага (The Dorm).

Since 2015 Farmonova has been participating in KVN, a Russian humor TV show and competition, as a member of the Bishkek-based team Азия MIX (Asia MIX). Азия MIX is an international team with members from Kazakhstan, Kyrgyzstan, Tajikistan, and Uzbekistan.

=== 2016 controversy ===
In July 2016, Farmonova faced criticism for "making fun of the Uzbek people" during one of the episodes of the Russian show in Saint Petersburg. This led to the suspension of Farmonova's license by Uzbeknavo, Uzbekistan's government agency that issues licenses to performers.

== Discography ==
=== Music videos ===
Year	Title	Director
2009	"Bahor-kuz" (feat. Mirjamol)	
2010	"Dilbar" (feat. Madina)	Jasur Shametov
2013	"Ayt"	
2016	"Chamanda gul"	Izzat Lutfullaev

== Filmography ==
Below is a chronologically ordered list of films in which Sitora Farmonova has appeared.

Film
Year	Film	Role	Notes
2003	Don Juan (Don Juan)		
2004	Marjona (Marjona)	Nargiza	
2004	Sarvinoz (Sarvinoz)	Nargiza	
2004	Xavfli burilish (A Dangerous Turn)	Dilorom	
2006	Uchinchi tilak (The Third Wish)	Shahnoz	
2008	Kelgindi qaynona (The Alien Mother-in-Law)	Yulduz	
2009	Makrli dunyo (The Insidious World)	Dilobar	
2009	Qasd (Intent)		
2009	Sunami 2 (Tsunami 2)		
2010	Dinozavr qoldirgan iz (Dinosaur Trail)	Mohira	
2010	Qadrdonlar (Dear Friends)		
2010	Umid (Hope)	Malika	
2011	Mening akam boʻydoq! (My Brother is a Bachelor!)	Raʼno	
2011	Baikonur	Nazira	
2012	Endi dadam boʻydoq? (Now My Father is a Bachelor?)	Raʼno	
2013	Soddagina qiz (The Simple Girl)	Muyassar	
2014	Baxt ortidan (Following Happiness)	Lola	
2017	Orzudagi ayol (A Dream Woman)		
2017	Muzlagan (~)		

Television
Year	Title	Role	Notes
1998–2003	Ayol zoti (Women)	Secretary	Episodes 16
2006	Maftuna (Maftuna)	Maftuna	
2013	Общага (The Dorm)	Meerim	
2023	Alfons	Nur	

Music videos
Year	Song title	Artist
2004	"Dilorom"	Ravshan Sobirov
2006	"Begʻuborim"	Firdavs N
2006	"Zamonaviy"	Manzura
2009	"Radiostansiya"	100%
2010	"Oʻshasan"	Aziz Rametov
2010	"Tong shamoli"	Sarbon
2020	Dil	Munisa Rizayeva
2018	Yigʻlatma	Sardor Mamadaliyev
2022	Salom sevgi	Shohruhxon
2022	Oddiy bola	Shohruhxon
