= Alfons (Uzbekistani TV series) =

- Genre: Crime drama Melodrama
- Written by: Gozal Muxammedova
- Directed by: Shoxrux Abdurazzoqov
- Starring: Ulugʻbek Qodirov; Sitora Farmonova; Shoxrux Xamdamov; Kamol Bobonazarov; Ubaydulla Omon; Vazira Yunusova; Nodira Mahmudova; Aziza Nizamova; Shoira Otaboyeva
- Music by: Baxtiyor Ergashev
- Composer: Baxtiyor Ergashev
- Country of origin: Uzbekistan
- Original language: Uzbek
- No. of seasons: 2
- No. of episodes: 60

Production
- Executive producers: Sardor Komilov; Shoxrux Abdurazzoqov
- Producer: Milliy TV
- Production location: Toshkent
- Cinematography: Dilmurod Turdiboev
- Camera setup: Single-camera
- Running time: 35–40 min
- Production company: Milliy TV

Original release
- Network: Milliy TV
- Release: September 25 – December 16, 2023

Alfons is an Uzbek crime drama TV series created by Gozal Mukhammedova and Shakhrukh Abdurazzokov. The series produced by Milliy TV channel was filmed in cooperation with Uzbek filmmakers: The main roles in the film were played by Uzbek actors Ulugbek Kadiyrov, Sitora Farmonova, Shoxrux Xamdamov and Kamol Bobonazarov. Vazira Yunosova, Nodira Mahmudova and Ubaydulla Omon played a supporting role in this film.

The filming of the series started in 2021, and at that time, the series was called "Baxt Ochilari", but the filming was temporarily stopped due to lack of funds. At the beginning of 2022, the TV series was refinanced by the Milliy TV channel and the name of the series was changed to "Alfons". filming began in December 2022 and ended on August 10, 2023. The premiere of the series was broadcast on the Milliy TV channel on September 14, 2023.

== Plot ==
Three friends, Sadiy, Jawahir, and Komal pretend to be aligarchs and rob rich girls of their property. They take this fraudulent business to themselves and go to any lengths to make money.

== Creation ==
In September 2021, before the start of work on the "Alfons" series in Tashkent, work on the scripting of the "Alfons" series began, devoted to discussing the interpretation of ideas and drama. version of the film, as well as the casting process began.

The filming of the series was entrusted to the film company "PEGAS cinema-guroup". Famous young Uzbek actors and artists starred in the series.

The creative team of the "PEGAS cinema-guroup" created villas similar to the villas that Uzbekistan aligars live in today. Over a period of time, Ubek's creative team will cover 30 hectares of landscape. 15 buildings in 45 offices and magazines were surveyed.

== Cast ==
Actors	Role	Season	
Actors	Role	1	2
Ulugʻbek Qodirov	Sadiy Sadullayevich	Yes	Yes
Sitora Farmonova	Nur	Yes	Yes
Ubaydulla Omon	Doda	Yes	Yes
Shoxrux Xamdamov	Javohir	Yes	Yes
Kamol Bobonazarov	Azamat	Yes	Yes
Vazira Yunusova	Azmat's mother	Yes	Yes
Aziza Nizamova		Yes	Yes
Dilfuza Abduqodirova	Mohira To’rayeva	Yes	Yes
Shoira Otaboyeva		Yes	
Ruxshona	Sevinch		Yes
Nodira Mahmudova		Yes	Yes
Parizoda	Monika		Yes
Fara Alimov	Fara		Yes

== Production ==
=== Development ===
On 2022, it was announced that Milliy TV had given the production a series order for a first season consisting of ten episodes set to premiere in 2023. The series will be written by Gozal Muxammedova who will also executive produce alongside Milliy TV, Shoxrux Abdurazzoqov and Sardor Komilov.

=== Casting ===
Alongside the initial series announcement, it was confirmed that Shoxrux Xamdamov would star in the series as Javohir. It was announced that Ulugbek Kadiyrov played the main roles. In October 2021, it was reported that Sitora Farmonova, Ubaydulla Omon and Kamol Bobonazarov had joined the cast in a series regular capacity. On December 8, 2021, it became known that Vazira Yunusova and Nodira Mahmudova were confirmed for the secondary role.

=== Filming ===
Principal photography for the series reportedly began in 2022 in Tashkent City.
