= Tooth fairy =

Childhood folkloric figure

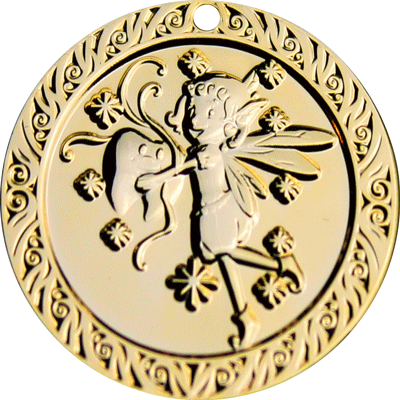
A coin depicting the Tooth Fairy

The tooth fairy is a folkloric figure of early childhood in Western and Western-influenced cultures. The folklore states that when children lose one of their baby teeth, they should place it underneath their pillow or on their bedside table; the tooth fairy will visit while they sleep, replacing the lost tooth with a small payment.

== Origins ==
During the Middle Ages, other superstitions arose surrounding children's teeth. Children in England were instructed to burn their baby teeth, on pain of spending eternity searching for the baby teeth in the afterlife. Fear of witches was another reason to bury or burn teeth. In medieval Europe, it was thought that a witch could assume total power over someone if they were to obtain one of their teeth.

While these beliefs may have had an influence, the earliest known record of the tooth fairy tradition itself is a 1908 "Household Hints" item in the Chicago Daily Tribune:

Tooth Fairy. Many a refractory child will allow a loose tooth to be removed if he knows about the tooth fairy. If he takes his little tooth and puts it under the pillow when he goes to bed the tooth fairy will come in the night and take it away, and in its place will leave some little gift. It is a nice plan for mothers to visit the 5 cent counter and lay in a supply of articles to be used on such occasions.

— Lillian Brown, "Tooth Fairy", Chicago Daily Tribune

== Appearance ==
Unlike Santa Claus and, to a lesser extent, the Easter Bunny, there are few details of the tooth fairy's appearance that are consistent in various versions of the myth. A 1984 study conducted by Rosemary Wells revealed that most – 74% of those surveyed – believed the tooth fairy to be female, while 12% believed the tooth fairy to be neither male nor female, and 8% believed the tooth fairy could be either male or female. When asked about her findings regarding the tooth fairy's appearance, Wells explained: "You've got your basic Tinkerbell-type tooth fairy with the wings, wand, a little older and whatnot. Then you have some people who think of the tooth fairy as a man, a bunny rabbit, or a mouse." One review of published children's books and popular artwork found the tooth fairy to be depicted in many various forms, including as a child with wings, a pixie, a dragon, a blue mother-figure, a flying ballerina, two little older men, a dental hygienist, occasionally a female dentist, a potbellied flying man smoking a cigar, a bat, a bear, and others. Unlike the well-established imagining of Santa Claus, differences in renderings of the tooth fairy are not as upsetting to children.

=== Depiction on coins and currency ===
Starting in 2011, the Royal Canadian Mint began selling special sets for newborn babies, birthdays, wedding anniversaries, "O Canada", and the tooth fairy. The tooth fairy quarters, which were issued only in 2011 and 2012, were packaged separately.

In 2020, the Royal Australian Mint began issuing "Tooth Fairy Kits" that included commemorative $2 coins.

== Reward ==
The reward left varies by country, the family's economic status, amounts the child's peers report receiving, and other factors. A 2013 survey by Visa Inc. found that American children receive $3.70 per tooth on average. According to the same survey, only 3% of children find a dollar or less and 8% find a five-dollar bill or more under their pillow.

The reward is affected by inflation. According to data gathered by the American dental insurance company Delta Dental, the average payout per tooth in the United States rose from $1.30 in 1998 to $6.23 in 2023. However, from 2024 to 2025 the amount fell from $5.84 to $5.01. According to Delta Dental, the payout's trends typically mirror macroeconomic conditions and the S&P 500 stock index. An exception was 2024 to 2025 when the S&P 500 rose 26 percent while the tooth's value fell 14 percent.

Delta Dental found that the first tooth lost gets a higher reward than other teeth on average in the United States.

== Belief ==
Belief in the tooth fairy is viewed in two very differing ways. On the one hand, children's beliefs are seen as part of the trusting nature of childhood. Conversely, belief in the tooth fairy is frequently used to label adults as being too trusting and ready to believe anything.

Parents tend to view the myth as providing comfort for children in losing a tooth. Research finds that belief in the tooth fairy may comfort a child experiencing fear or pain from losing a tooth. Mothers especially seem to value a child's belief as a sign that their "baby" is still a child and is not "growing up too soon". By encouraging belief in a fictional character, parents allow themselves to be comforted that their child still believes in fantasy and is not yet "grown up".

Children often discover the tooth fairy is imaginary as part of the age 5- to 7-year shift, often connecting this to other gift-bearing imaginary figures (such as Santa Claus and the Easter Bunny).

Author Vicki Lansky advises parents to tell their children early that the tooth fairy pays much more for a perfect tooth than a decayed one. According to Lansky, some families leave a note with the payment, praising the child for good dental habits.

Research findings suggest a possible relationship between a child's continued belief in the tooth fairy (and other fictional characters) and false memory syndrome.

== Related myths ==
=== El Ratón Pérez (Spain and Latin America) ===
In Spain and Hispanic America, El Ratoncito Pérez or Ratón Pérez (lit. transl. Perez the Little Mouse or Perez Mouse) is equivalent to the tooth fairy. He first appeared in an 1894 tale written by Luis Coloma for King Alfonso XIII, who had just lost a milk tooth at the age of eight. As is traditional in other cultures, when a child loses a tooth it is customary for the child to place it under the pillow so that El Ratoncito Pérez will exchange it for a small payment or gift. The tradition is almost universal in Spanish cultures, with some slight differences.

He is generally known as "El Ratoncito Pérez", except for some regions of Mexico, Peru, and Chile, where he is called "El Ratón de los Dientes" (transl. The Tooth Mouse), and in Argentina, Venezuela, Uruguay, and Colombia, where he is known simply as "El Ratón Pérez". He was used by Colgate marketing in Venezuela and Spain.

=== Elsewhere in Europe ===
In France and French-speaking Belgium, this character is called La Petite Souris (The Little Mouse).

From parts of Lowland Scotland comes a tradition similar to the fairy mouse: a white fairy rat who purchases children's teeth with coins.

In Italy, the tooth fairy (Fatina dei denti) is also often replaced by a tiny mouse named Topolino. Formichina (little ant) can also be present in Veneto. In some areas the same role is held by Saint Apollonia, known as Santa Polonia in Veneto. (Saint Apollonia's legendary martyrdom involved having her teeth broken; she is frequently depicted artistically holding a tooth and is considered the patron saint of dentistry and those with toothache and dental problems.)

In Catalonia, the most popular would be Els Angelets (little angels) and also "Les animetes" (little souls) and as in the other countries, the tooth is placed under the pillow in exchange of a coin or a little token.

In the Basque Country, and especially in Biscay, there is Mari Teilatukoa ("Mary from the roof"), who lives in the roof of the baserri and catches the teeth thrown by the children. In Cantabria, he is known as L'Esquilu de los dientis ("the tooth squirrel").

=== Asia and Africa ===
In Japan, a different variation calls for lost upper teeth to be thrown straight down to the ground and lower teeth straight up into the air; the idea is that incoming teeth will grow in straight.

In Korea, throwing both upper and lower teeth on the roof was common. The practice is rooted around the Korean national bird, the magpie. It is said that if the magpie finds a tooth on the roof, it will bring good luck. Some scholars think the myth derived from the word 까치 (Ka-chi) which was a middle Korean word for magpies that sounds similar to "new teeth", or because of the significance of magpies in Korean mythology as a messenger between gods and humans.

In Middle Eastern countries (including Iraq, Jordan, Egypt, and Sudan), there is a tradition of throwing a baby tooth up into the sky to the sun or to Allah. This tradition may originate in a pre-Islamic offering dating back to the 13th century. It was also mentioned by Izz bin Hibat Allah Al Hadid in the 13th century.

In Mali, children throw baby teeth into the chicken coop to receive a chicken the following day.

In Afrikaans speaking families in South Africa, children leave their teeth in a shoe so that the Tandemuis (Tooth Mouse) can replace the teeth with money.

== In popular culture ==
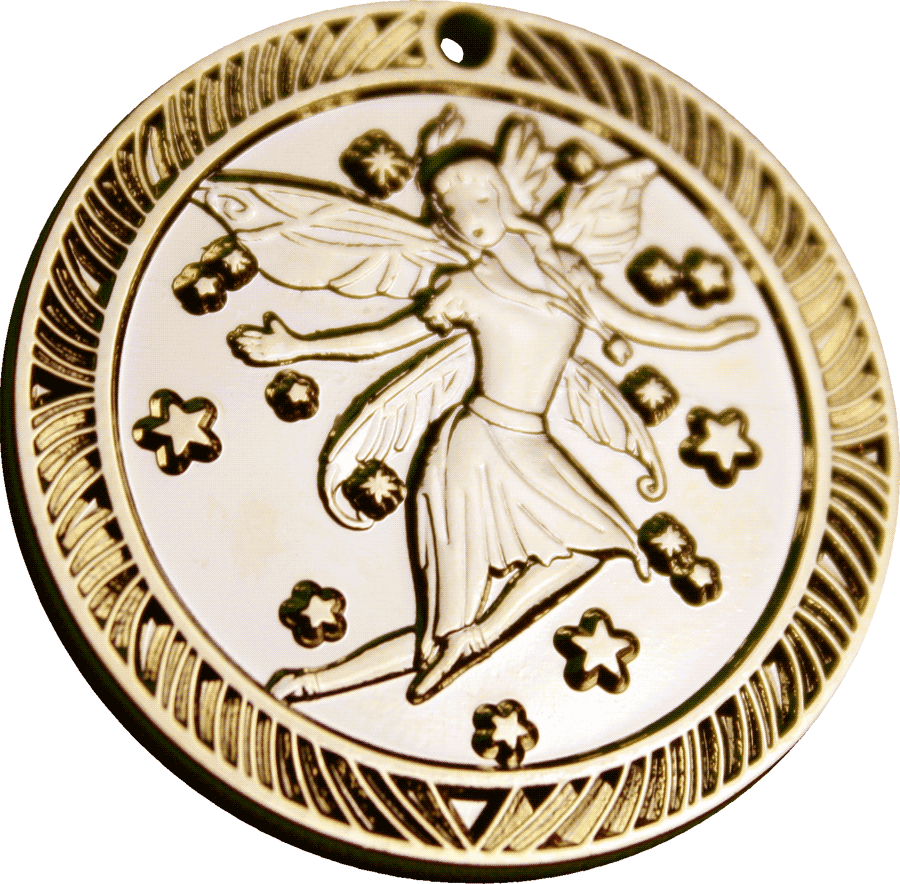
A coin depicting the Tooth Fairy

In 1927, a children's playwright, Esther Watkins Arnold, brought to life an extraordinary, elf-like creature, in an 8-page playlet. She playfully christened it as the "Tooth fairy", and this mythical creature had the power to fly around visiting young children, to collect their fallen (milk) teeth.

== See also ==
- Don't Be Afraid of the Dark – A film featuring an early version of the creatures
- Fairy
- Ratoncito Pérez – Spanish tooth mouse
- Hammaspeikko – Finnish tooth troll
- Hogfather – Discworld novel featuring their version of the tooth fairy
