= I Won't Let You Not Love Me =

- Spanish theatrical release poster
- Spanish: No dejaré que no me quieras
- Directed by: José Luis Acosta
- Screenplay by: Silvia Pérez de Pablos; José Luis Acosta
- Produced by: Federico Bermúdez de Castro
- Starring: Pere Ponce; Viviana Saccone; Alberto San Juan; Ana Risueño; Noelia Castaño; Martxelo Rubio; Melani Olivares; Juan José Pardo; José Luis Pellicena; Luis Brandoni
- Cinematography: Jesús Escosa
- Edited by: Pablo Blanco
- Music by: Víctor Reyes
- Production companies: Benjamín Producciones; Patagonik Film Group
- Distributed by: United International Pictures (es)
- Release dates: 18 April 2002 (Argentina); 10 January 2003 (Spain)
- Countries: Spain; Argentina
- Language: Spanish

I Won't Let You Not Love Me (Spanish: No dejaré que no me quieras) is a 2002 Spanish-Argentine comedy film directed by José Luis Acosta starring Pere Ponce, Alberto San Juan, Ana Risueño, and Viviana Saccone.

== Plot ==
Seeking to recover some diamonds stolen by his former wife Maria, jeweller Javier teams up with Enrique, who has just been ditched by his girlfriend Elisa.

== Cast ==
- Pere Ponce as Javier
- Alberto San Juan as Enrique
- Ana Risueño as Elisa
- Viviana Saccone as Maria
- Noelia Castaño
- Martxelo Rubio
- Melani Olivares
- Juanjo Pardo
- José Luis Pellicena
- Luis Brandoni
- Leticia Brédice
- Osvaldo Santoro

== Production ==
The film is a Benjamín PC and Patagonik Film Group production. The director pitched the film as an "unpretentious amusement about lies".

== Release ==
The film screened in the 'Panorámica' section of the Seville Film and Sport Festival in November 2002. Distributed by United International Pictures, it was released theatrically in Spain on 10 January 2003.

== Reception ==
Jonathan Holland of Variety deemed the "disappointing" comedy film to weld "a hackneyed plotline to intermittently amusing perfs".

Casimiro Torreiro of El País concluded that the film "is a comedy as licitly ambitious as it is unfortunate and failed, as unbalanced on the inside as it is banal and pedestrian on the surface".

La Nación gave the film a 'bad' review, considering that "it is absolutely impossible to deduce what the makers of this Argentine-Spanish co-production wanted to aim for".

== See also ==
- List of Argentine films of 2002
- List of Spanish films of 2003
