= Melani Olivares =

Spanish actress

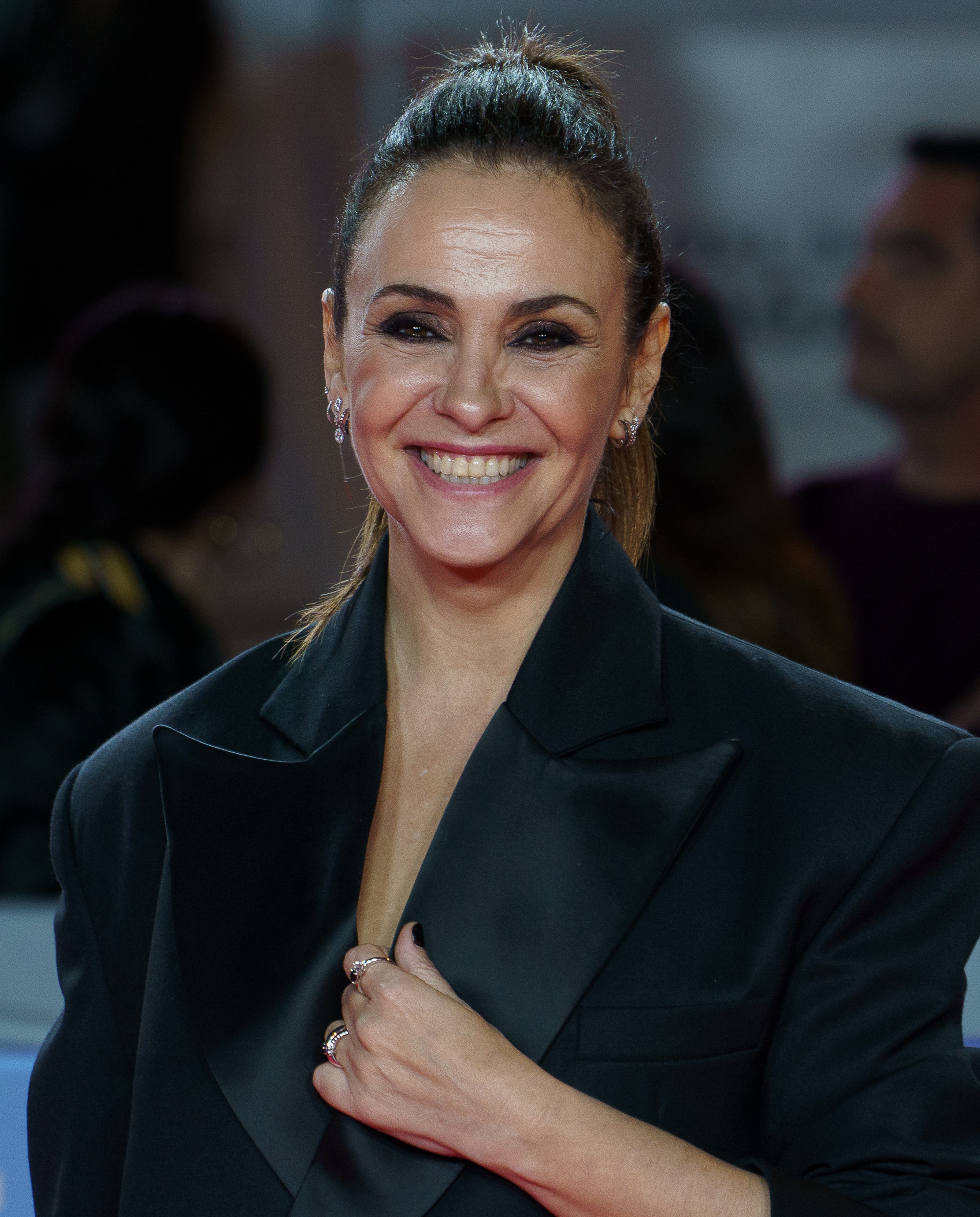
- Olivares in 2025
- Born: 18 February 1973 (age 52); Badalona, Spain
- Occupation: Actress

Melani Olivares Mora (born 1973) is a Spanish actress. She is mainly known for her performance as Paz in the comedy television series Aída.

== Biography ==
Olivares was born in Badalona in 1973. She had her television debut in 1993 as host in the Antena 3's youth show Leña al mono que es de goma. After training at the Cristina Rota's acting school, her acting career began in 1995 with a performance in La niña de tus sueños.

Her extensive credits include Quédate, a short film for which she won the Best Actress award at VI Certamen Nacional de Cortos de Dos Hermanas.

In March 2021, she declared herself to be bisexual and polyamorous.

== Films ==
- La niña de tus sueños (1995)
- Me da igual (2000)
- No te fallaré (2001)
- Noche de reyes (2001)
- No dejaré que no me quieras (2002)
- Agujeros en el cielo (2004)
- Shevernatze un ángel corrupto (2007)
- 8 citas (2008)
- Temporal (2013)
- Dos a la carta (2014)
- Crisis (2014)
