= Surprise! (film) =

1995 film by Veit Helmer

Surprise! is a 1995 short film by German director Veit Helmer. The film had 48 festival invitations and 26 awards, including a Golden Space Needle award at the 1995 Seattle International Film Festival. The story centers on a Rube Goldberg device.

== Plot ==
A man gets up in the morning before his girlfriend, still asleep naked in bed. He begins to set up various devices.. When he leaves the house, he sets off several fuses that put the devices in motion. The woman is catapulted out of bed, showered, dressed and taken to the breakfast table, where coffee is automatically poured for her and toast flies onto her plate. A crossbow opens the breakfast egg and a device delivers a photo of the man containing a love message. However, the woman is not very impressed as most of the actions have gone wrong.

== Production ==
Interviewing Helmer for Filmmaker, Nick Dawson recalls that the first "studied at Munich’s School of Television and Film, and made quirky shorts throughout his time there" including what he calls the "highly inventive Surprise!".

== Reception ==
A contemporary Italian reviewer judged that "the taste, in (their) personal opinion, (was) a little too heavy German style".

The film has been described as "quirky".

== Screening and awards ==
Filmdienst recalls the short has received 32 awards while the Danish journal Kosmorama numbers 130 screenings in festivals (for more than 40 awards garnered).
