= Ratoncito Pérez =

Fantasy figure in Spanish and American cultures

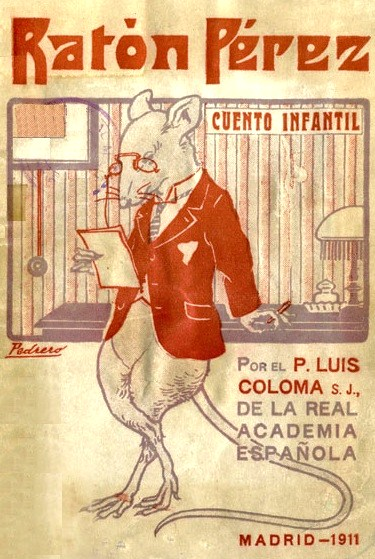
Cover of the 1911 first edition of the Ratón Pérez tale by Luis Coloma, illustrated by Mariano Pedrero

El Ratoncito Pérez or Ratón Pérez (lit. transl. Perez the Little Mouse or Perez Mouse) is a fantasy figure of early childhood in Spanish and Hispanic American cultures. The folklore states that when children lose one of their milk teeth, they should place it underneath their pillow or on their bedside table and he will visit while they sleep, replacing the lost tooth with a small payment or gift, as does the Tooth Fairy in other cultures. Although he first appeared in oral tradition folktales such as The Vain Little Mouse, it was Luis Coloma who in 1894 turned him into a tooth dealer in a tale written for an eight-year-old King Alfonso XIII.

The tradition is almost universal in Spanish cultures, with some slight differences. He is generally known as "El Ratoncito Pérez", except in some regions of Mexico, Guatemala, Peru and Chile, where he is called "El Ratón de los Dientes" (transl. The Tooth Mouse), and in Argentina, Venezuela, Uruguay and Colombia, where he is simply known as "El Ratón Pérez". Similarly in the Philippines, some cultures and families participate in the tradition, although he is typically just called Ratoncito, and is sometimes said to be a rat king.

El Ratoncito Pérez stars in the 2006 Spanish-Argentine film The Hairy Tooth Fairy and its 2008 sequel. He has also been used in Colgate marketing in Venezuela.

== Origin ==
Very neatly, [King Buby] put under the pillow the letter with the tooth inside, and sat on it ready to wait for Ratón Pérez, even if it was necessary to stay awake until dawn.

— Luis Coloma, Ratón Pérez (1894)

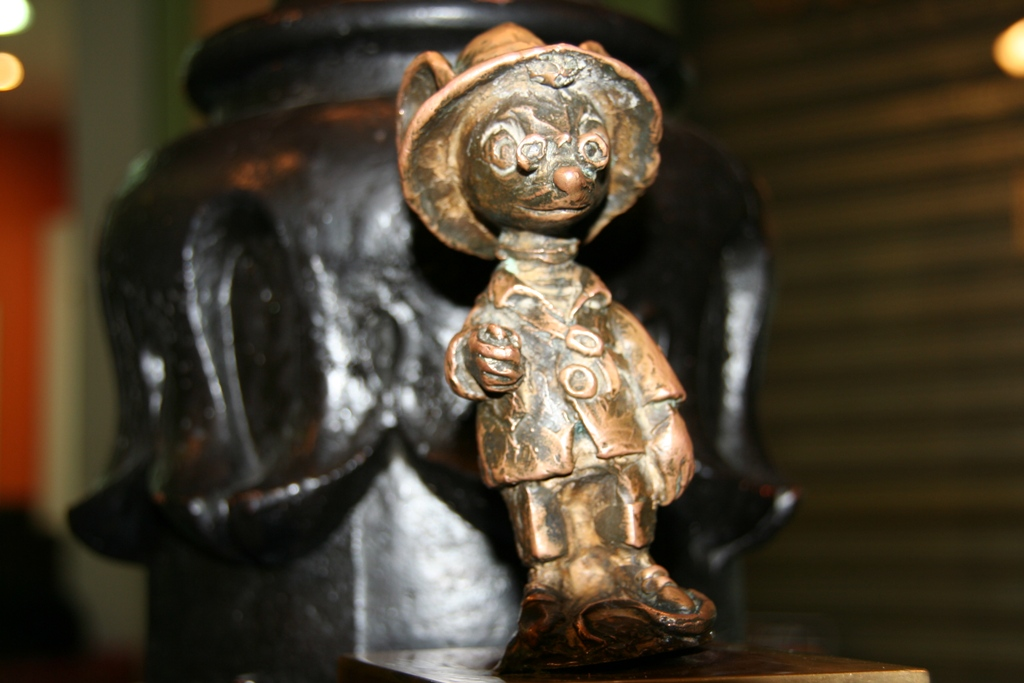
Bronze statuette of El Ratoncito Pérez

A mouse named Ratón Pérez, Ratonpérez or Ratompérez first appeared in the oral tradition folktales La hormiguita (transl. The Little Ant), as her gentle and timid husband, and in The Vain Little Mouse, also as her husband. These tales were first published in Cuentos, oraciones, adivinanzas y refranes populares (1877) by Fernán Caballero. This character would later inspire Luis Coloma, who would make him part of Spanish traditional folklore by turning him into a sort of Tooth Fairy.

In 1894, Queen Maria Christina commissioned Coloma to write a tale for King Alfonso XIII, who had just lost a tooth at the age of eight. Coloma's story follows Ratón Pérez, who lived with his family in a box of cookies at the basement of Prast confectionery store in Madrid, but frequently ran away from home through the pipes of the city, and into the bedrooms of children who had lost their teeth. The story details how he cunningly misleads any cats in the vicinity who may be lurking, and includes his interaction with King Buby (Queen Maria Christina's nickname for Alfonso XIII).

The tale was first published in 1902 together with other stories in Nuevas lecturas. In 1911, Ratón Pérez was published for the first time as an independent story and was illustrated by Mariano Pedrero. Coloma's original manuscript, with his signature and a dedication to King Alfonso XIII, is now kept in the vault of the Royal Library at Royal Palace of Madrid.

In 2003, the City Council of Madrid paid tribute to Ratón Pérez with a commemorative plaque at the façade of Number 8 Calle del Arenal, where the mouse was said to have lived. The plaque reads: "Here lived, in a box of cookies at Prast confectionery store, Ratón Pérez, according to the story that the father Coloma wrote for the child King Alfonso XIII". He thus became the first fictional character honored with a plaque by the City Council. Inside the building, where there are now several shops and offices, another plaque and a small bronze statue were also installed.

== Adaptations ==
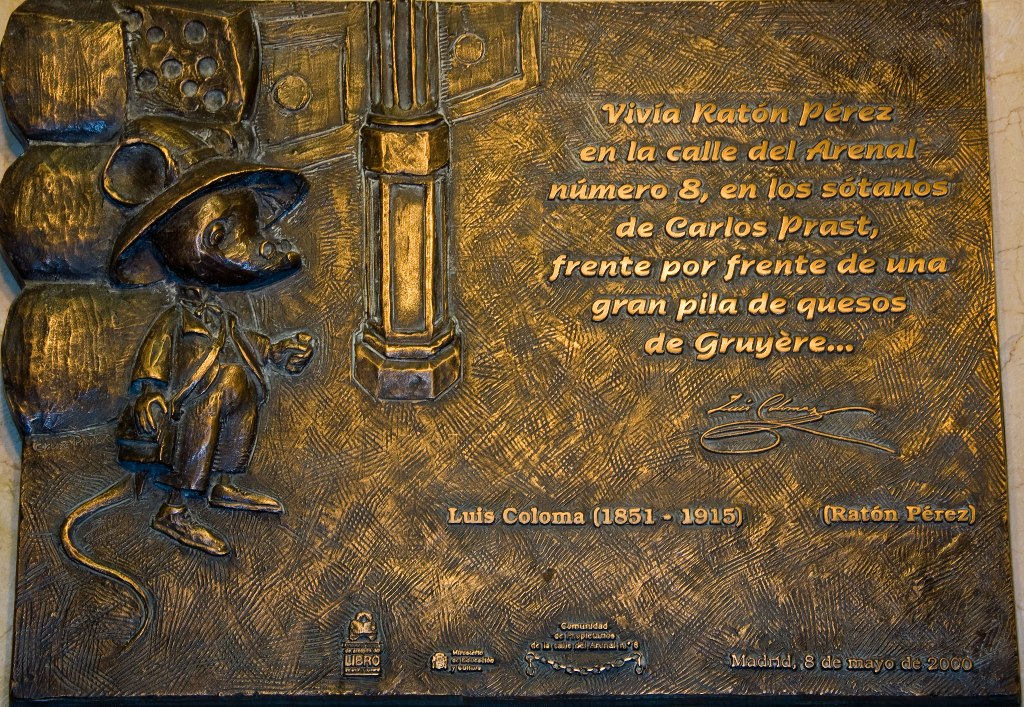
Bronze commemorative plaque placed inside the building where El Ratoncito Pérez was said to have lived

Coloma's original story has been retold and adapted in various formats since it was published. One such retelling was the English-language translation by Lady Moreton, entitled Perez the Mouse and illustrated by George Howard Vyse, which was published in 1914.

Other adaptations include El ratoncito Pérez (1999) by Olga Lecaye, La mágica historia del Ratoncito Pérez (1996) by Fidel del Castillo, ¡S.O.S., salvad al ratoncito Pérez! (1995) by Eduardo Galán and Ratoncito Pérez, en Vuelo de Cometas (1999) by Vicenta Fernández Martín.

El Ratón Pérez stars in the 2006 Spanish-Argentine live-action/animated film The Hairy Tooth Fairy directed by Juan Pablo Buscarini, and in its 2008 sequel. He makes an appearance in 2012 DreamWorks Animation's film Rise of the Guardians, when one of the Tooth Fairy's mini fairies finds him at work and tackles him before the Tooth Fairy stops the fight. He also has been used in Colgate marketing in Venezuela.

The Handy Manny episode "Julieta's Tooth" makes mention of "Mr. Perez" among other nicknames for the "tooth Mouse" to take her tooth after Manny retrieves it from the sink trap. In episode 5 of the Spanish television series El Internado, "Un cadáver en La Laguna", El Ratoncito Pérez appears in order to take a tooth from Paula. In the Mexican cartoon El Chavo Animado in the episode "Baby Teeth" the protagonist is about to have his baby tooth pulled and the story about the mouse is told to him.

== See also ==
- Tooth Fairy
- The Little Mouse
- Spanish folklore
