= Absurdistan (film) =

2008 German-French comedy film

- Theatrical poster
- Directed by: Veit Helmer
- Written by: Veit Helmer; Zaza Buadze; Gordan Mihic; Ahmet Golbol
- Starring: Maximilian Mauff; Kristýna Maléřová
- Cinematography: Giorgi Beridze
- Edited by: Vincent Assmann
- Music by: Shigeru Umebayashi
- Release date: 20 March 2008
- Running time: 88 minutes
- Countries: Germany; Azerbaijan
- Language: Russian

Absurdistan is a 2008 German-Azerbaijan comedy film written and directed by Veit Helmer.

It formed part of the World Cinema Dramatic Competition at the 2008 Sundance Film Festival. It was also entered into the 30th Moscow International Film Festival.

== Plot ==
Set in a remote and forgotten desert mountain village in the former Soviet Union, the film chronicles a standoff between the sexes. The local women decide to withhold sex (a sex strike) until their lazy men fix the pipeline that carries the village's water supply. Young lovers Aya and Temelko are caught up in the argument and Temelko becomes determined to fix the pipeline so he can be with her.

== Cast ==
- Kristýna Maléřová as Aya
- Max Mauff as Temelko
- Nino Chkheidze as Aya's Grandmother
- Vano Yantbelidze as Dantscho, the shooting gallery owner
- Ani Amiridze as Lenora, Dantscho's daughter
- Ilko Stefanovski as Guri, Temelko's Father
- Assun Planas as Temelko's Mother
- Otto Kuhnle as the Barber
- Hijran Nasirova as the Barber's Wife
- Hendrik Arnst as Landlord
- Olga Nefyodova as Landlord's Wife
- Adalet Zyadhanov as Policeman
- Matanat Atakishiyeva as Policeman's Wife
- Azelarab Kaghat as Baker
- Michaela Bandi as Baker's Wife
- Blagoja Spirkovski-Dzumerko as Cobbler
- Dace Bonate as Cobbler's Wife
- Elhan Guliyev as Bus Driver
- Julietta Koleva as Bus Driver's Wife
- Helder Costa as Doctor
- Monica Calle as Doctor's Wife
- Kazim Abdullayev as Shepherd
- Firangiz Babyeva as Shepherd's Wife
- László Németh as Postman
- Sarah Bensoussan as Postman's Wife
- Mubariz Alixanli as Watchmaker
- Khatuna Ioseliani as Watchmaker's Wife
- Nurradin Guliyev as Beekeeper
- Elena Spitsina as Beekeeper's Wife
- Radomil Uhlir as Butcher
- Suzana Petricevic as Butcher's Wife
- Rafiq Azimov as Carpenter
- Nelli Cozaru as Carpenter's Wife
- Vlasta Velisavljevic as Veteran
- Gisela Fritsch as Grandmother (voice)

== Production ==
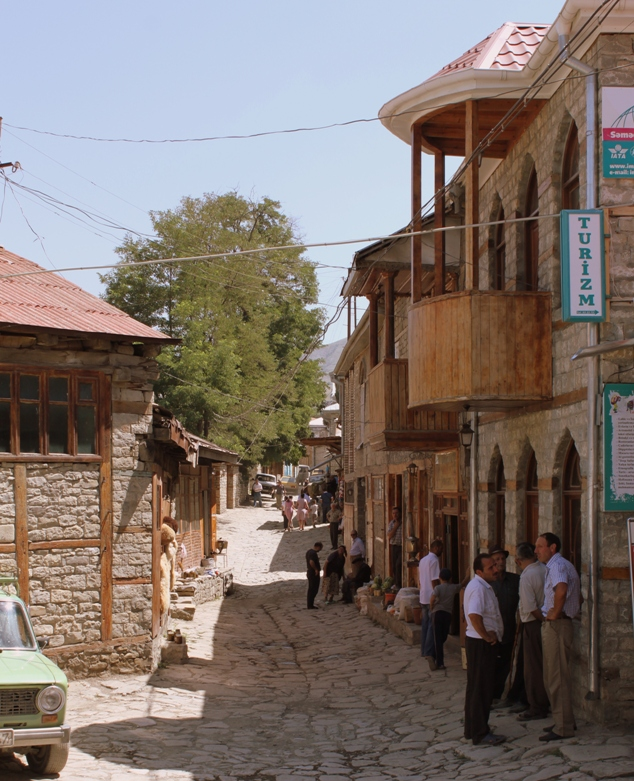
Absurdistan was filmed on location in Lahıc, Ismailli, Azerbaijan.

Helmer started writing the script after reading a 2001 newspaper account of women in the Turkish village of Sirt refusing to accommodate their husbands until they fixed a broken pipeline. He collaborated with Gordan Mihic and Zaza Buadze on the screenplay, receiving funding from Sources2, the Mediterranean Film Institute and the European Commission's MEDIA New Talent programme. Although the film was made on a low budget, Helmer was able to gather a cast of 40 actors from 14 different countries. Most of Absurdistan was filmed on location in Lahıc, Ismailli, Azerbaijan over a nine-week period in summer 2006. As there are no hotels in the village, most of the 90 member crew had to stay with villagers. Additional scenes were filmed in Çayqaraqoyunlu, Shaki and Tbilisi.

== Release ==
Absurdistan had its world premiere at the 2008 Sundance Festival where it was nominated for the Grand Prize in the World Cinema Dramatic category. It released in theatres in Germany on 20 March 2008.

== Awards ==
- 2008 Special Award at the Bavarian Film Awards (Veit Helmer)
- 2008 Film Award in Gold for Best Production Design at the German Film Awards (Erwin Prib)
- 2009 International Fantasy Film Award at Fantasporto (Veit Helmer)
- 2009 Grand Prize for Best Feature Film at Mediawave, Hungary (Veit Helmer)

== See also ==
- Lysistrata, a play by Aristophanes with a similar plot
- The Source
