= The Hairy Tooth Fairy =

El Ratón Pérez
- Theatrical release poster
- Directed by: Juan Pablo Buscarini
- Written by: Enrique Cortés
- Produced by: Julio Fernández; Cecilia Bossi; Ariel Saúl; Carlos Fernández
- Starring: Delfina Varni; Nicolas Torcanowsky; Alejandro Awada
- Cinematography: Miguel Abal
- Edited by: César Custodio
- Music by: Daniel Goldberg
- Production companies: Patagonik Film Group; Filmax Animation
- Distributed by: Buena Vista International (Argentina); Filmax (Spain)
- Release date: 13 July 2006
- Running time: 90 minutes
- Countries: Argentina; Spain
- Language: Spanish
- Budget: US$2.7 million

El Ratón Pérez is a 2006 film directed by Juan Pablo Buscarini, starring Delfina Varni, Nicolas Torcanowsky and the voices of Alejandro Awada as Ratón Perez, Mariano Chiesa as Commander Fugaz and Roly Serrano as El Rata. The film includes 3D animated characters created by the Patagonik Film Group in Argentina, and Filmax Animation in Spain. It was followed by a 2008 sequel, El Ratón Pérez 2.

The film was screened at the 2006 Toronto International Film Festival, under the English title The Hairy Tooth Fairy. Ratón Peréz is the Argentine-Spanish version of the tooth fairy.

== Plot ==
Lucía, a restless kid, suffers a domestic accident and loses a tooth. Her father Santiago, an unemployed chef, and her mother Pilar a successful architect with work to spare, ease her with the illusion that Ratón Pérez will stop by her room that night, take her tooth and replace it with some money. What they don't know is that an alert sign is already being spread.

Ratón Pérez is alerted of the situation. He lives on a boat anchored at the port along with hundreds of mice who gather the teeth and then sculpt and polish them to turn them into shiny round pearls. These are taken through the city sewers to a jewelry store own by Morientes, an old friend of Pérez that trades for their weight in gold coins. Heartless and ambitious thugs decide to kidnap Pérez and take control of his boat and his fortune.

Lucía, with the help of her cousin Ramiro, rescue Pérez together.

The story was based partially on the Ratoncito Pérez, a character in Spanish folklore similar to the Tooth fairy.

== Cast ==
=== Voices ===
- Alejandro Awada - Ratón Pérez
- Mariano Chiesa - Commander Fugaz
- Roly Serrano - El rata

=== Humans ===
- Nicolás Torcanowski - Ramiro
- Delfina Varni - Lucía
- Fabián Mazzei - Santiago
- Ana María Orozco - Pilar
- Joe Rígoli - Justo Amancio Morientes
- Diego Gentile - Pipo
- Ana María Nazar - Condesa
- Enrique Porcellana - Gordo
- Fernanda Bodria - Maestra
- Anahí Martella - Samanta
- Fernando Paz - Hormiga
- Marcos Metta - Professor
- Pedro Martínez Goncalvez - Alumno 1
