= Noche en la terraza =

- Directed by: Jorge Zima
- Starring: Soledad Alloni; Diego Freigedo; Gabriel Fernández
- Release date: 2002
- Countries: Argentina; Venezuela
- Language: Spanish

Noche en la terraza is an Argentine-Venezuelan co-production color film directed by Jorge Zima from his own screenplay. It was released on 27 Jun 2002 and starred Soledad Alloni, Diego Freigedo and Gabriel Fernández.

== Plot ==
Paula is in a relationship until another man appears in her life and makes her rethink her terms.

== Cast ==
The following actors participated in the film:

- Soledad Alloni...Paula
- Diego Freigedo...Federico
- Gabriel Fernández...Lucas
- Leila María...Marcela
- Sergio Pascual...Diego
- Horacio Minujen...Editor
- Osvaldo Sanders...Neighbor
- Mercedes Fraile...Neighbor
- Romina Gaetani...Advertising girl
- Mariano Musso...Advertising girl
- Héctor Alba...Beto
- Peter Larsen...Terry Jackson voice
- Matilde Ibarguren...Paula's mom voice
- Paula Marull

== Reception ==
The film was selected to be screened in the Made in Spanish section of the 2001 San Sebastian International Film Festival and received the Best Foreign Drama Award at the 2001 New York International Independent Film Festival.
