= Ruxshona =

Uzbek singer, actress, and TV presenter (born 1994)

Ruxshona Рухшона
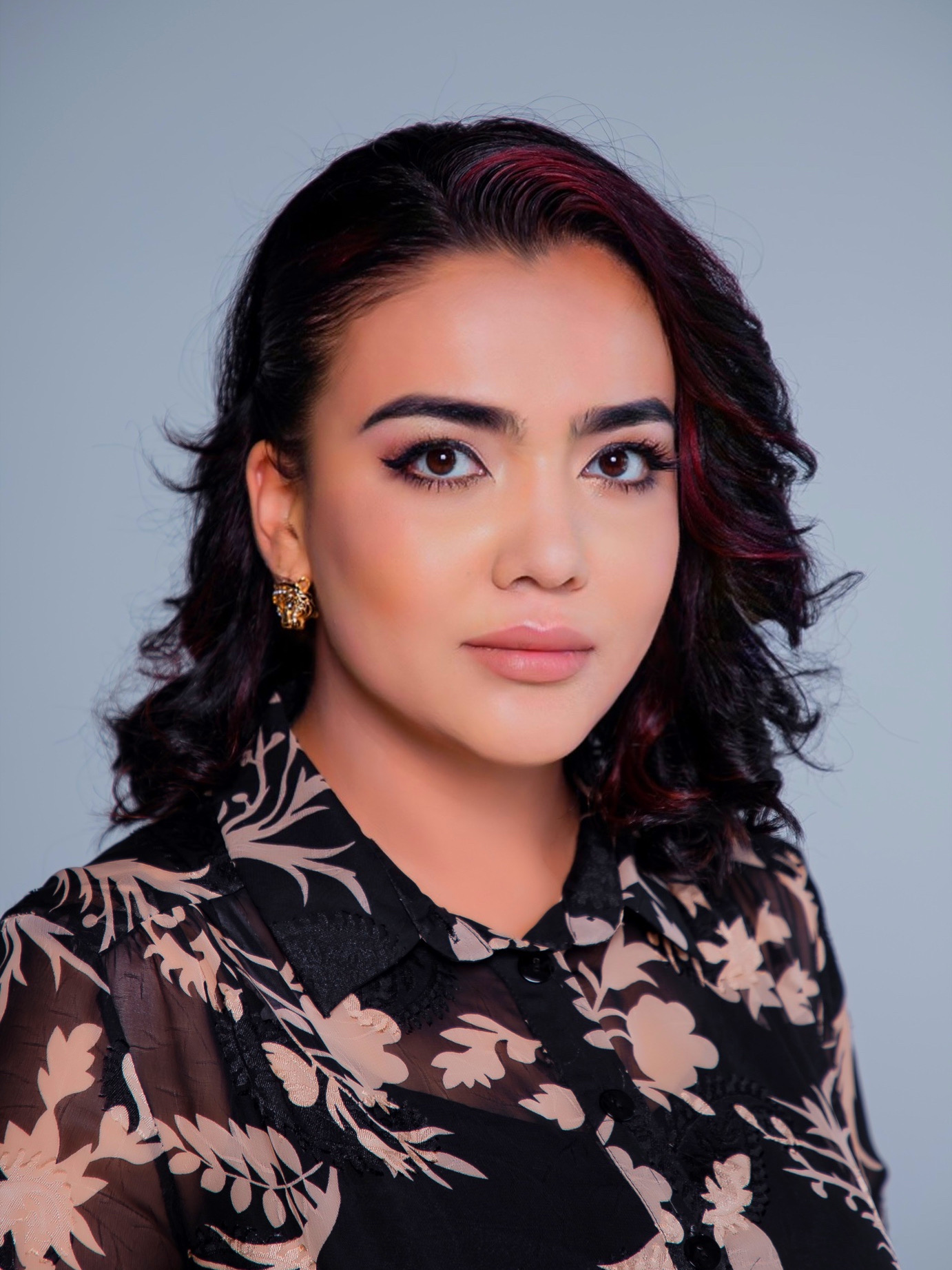
- Born: Rukhshona Toyir Kizi Mahmudova; 21 March 1994 (age 31); Tashkent, Uzbekistan
- Citizenship: Uzbekistan
- Education: University of Journalism and Mass Communication
- Occupations: Singer, actress, TV presenter
- Years active: 2010–present
- Children: 2

Rukhshona Toyir Kizi Mahmudova (Uzbek: Ruxhshona Toyir Qizi, Рухшона Тойир қизи; born 21 March 1994) is an Uzbek singer, actress, and TV presenter. The singer was awarded "Badge of Uzbekistan".

== Personal life ==
Ruxshona was born on 21 March 1994 in Tashkent. In 2010, Ruxshona participated in a music project of Akfa media company. From 2007 to 2010, she studied at the Republican Variety and Circus College. Since 2019 she has been a student at the University of Journalism and Mass Communication. In 2014, Ruxshona married film director Sanjar Matkarimov. In 2015, Ruxshona's daughter Habiba was born. The following year, in 2016, her son Shukurbek was born. In October 2021 Ruxshona announced that she had divorced her husband, director Sanjar Matkarimov.

== Career ==
=== Singing career ===
Ruxshona started her singing career in 2010. Ruxshona's first single Yuragim became a hit in Uzbekistan and she gained fame in pop culture. Following the success of Yuragim, Ruxshona released her first album, Azizim in 2011. The Album became one of the best selling albums of the year. In 2011, she sang in a duet with Avraam Russo.

Ruxshona's second album Joni-joni was released in 2013 and became another hit album for her. Album's first single "Yuragim" was released on radio channels and was received well by fans. Singles such as "Shekilli", "Yana yana", "Vatan", "Unutma meni" also became hits. Ruxshona has more than 60 original songs and more than 25 clips.

=== Acting career ===
Ruxshona has portrayed main characters in several Uzbek movies. Shomurod va Durdona, in which Ruxshona played the lead role, did well in box office and Ruxshona received positive reviews for her role. She also played the leading role in the 2011 Uzbek movie "Enagalar". The soundtrack for the movie "Zamonaviy sovchilar" was sung by Ruxshona herself. Ruxshona played at movie called Kutilmagan qongiroq which was popular among uzbek people.

== Discography ==
=== Studio albums ===
- "Azizim" (2011)
- "Joni-joni" (2013)

== Filmography ==
This is a chronologically ordered list of films in which Ruxshona has appeared.

Year	Title	Role	Ref
2010	Shomurod va Durdona (Shomurod and Durdona)		
2010	Bekorchilar (Idles)		
2010	Borilar-3 Oxirgi qarz	Ruxshona	
2011	Uchrashuv (Meeting)	Ruxshona	
2011	Zamonaviy sovchilar (Modern suitors) (vocal)	Ruxshona	
2011	Enagalar (Nurses)	Nozima	
2011	Nafrat (Hate)		
2012	Andijonlik mehmon (Guest from Andijan)	Nazokat	
2012	Kutilmagan qongiroq (Unexpected call)	Asal	
2012	Xizmat doirasidan tashqarida	Guli	
2013	Bekorchilar makoni	Karina	
2014	Zamonaviy sovchilar 3 (Modern suitors 3) (vocal)	Ruxshona	

== Music videos ==
Year	Song	Director
2010	"Yuragim"	Rustam Murodov
2010	"Sog'indim yana" (feat. Bojalar and Sirojiddin)	Rustam Jamolov
2010	"Azizim"	Rustam Murodov
2010	"Chegaralar bormi" (feat. Bojalar)	Sarvar Isaev
2010	"Qachondir"	Yodgor Nosirov
2010	"Seni deya" (feat. Sirojiddin)	Murod Sodiqov
2011	"Zamonaviy sovchilar"	Jonrid
2011	"Seni sevaman" (feat. Ziyoda Qobilova and Marka group)	Jasur Shametov
2011	"Soy bo'yida"	Yodgor Nosirov
2011	"Xizmat doirasidan tashqarida"	Jahongir Ahmedov
2011	"Yur"	Sarvar Karimov
2012	"Благодарю" (feat. Avraam Russo)	Mirmaxsud Ohunov
2012	"Imkon bo'lmasa"	Sarvar Karimov
2012	"Sevasan mani"	Sarvar Karimov
2012	"Suesen meni"	Sarvar Karimov
2012	"Bir kun"	Dilmurod Masaidov
2012	"Yaqining bo'lay"	Sarvar Karimov
2012	"Не играй"	Sarvar Karimov
2013	"Kabutar"	Sarvar Karimov
2013	"Vatan"	Jonrid Sagiev
2013	"Joni-joni"	Jonrid Sagiev
2013	"Yalla"	Jonrid Sagiev
2014	"Shekilli"	Sanjar Matkarimov
2015	"Hayot"	Sanjar Matkarimov
2015	"Жизнь"	Sanjar Matkarimov
2016	"Rumbaka"	Sanjar Matkarimov
2017	"Yurakkinam"	Sanjar Matkarimov
