= Cóndor Crux, la leyenda =

Cóndor Crux
- Poster
- Directed by: Juan Pablo Buscarini; Swan Glecer
- Written by: Juan Pablo Buscarini; Swan Glecer
- Produced by: José Luis Garci
- Starring: Leticia Brédice
- Edited by: César Custodio
- Music by: Juan Pablo Compaired; Diego Grimblat
- Production companies: Patagonik Film Group; Tornasol Films S.A.
- Distributed by: Buena Vista International
- Release date: 6 January 2000
- Running time: 88 minutes
- Countries: Argentina; Spain
- Language: Spanish
- Budget: $1.6 million

Cóndor Crux, la leyenda ('Condor Crux, The Legend'), also known as Cóndor Crux, is a 2000 Argentine animated science fiction adventure film written and directed by Juan Pablo Buscarini and Swan Glecer. The film combines 2D animation with 3D computer-generated backgrounds, in a style similar to the American-made Titan A.E. (2000), which was still production at the time of Cóndor Crux's release (the film premiered on 6 January 2000, while Titan A.E. was released on 16 June of the same year). The film received mixed-to-positive reviews and won a Silver Condor Award for Best Animated Film, but was a failure at the box-office. It is currently available on Disney+ in Latin America (excluding Brazil).

== Plot ==
The action takes place in a dystopian Buenos Aires in 2068 (now called Darwin), where the sinister Phizar, head of a dark corporation, chaotically governs the Southern Cone of the American continent. Dr. Crux is an old rebel scientist who fights the Phizar regime, and his son Juan Crux is the one who must become the hero expected to fight the villain and his henchmen and free the city from the dome that prevents him from making contact with the outside.

== Cast ==
- Damián de Santo as Juan 'Condor' Crux
- Arturo Maly as Phizar
- José Soriano as Dr. Crux
- Favio Posca as Sigmund
- Leticia Brédice as Zonia
- Aldo Barbero as Amauta
- Max Berliner as Voice

== See also ==
- List of animated feature-length films
- List of computer-animated films
