= Çayqaraqoyunlu =

- Municipality
- Location within Azerbaijan Location within Shaki-Zagatala Economic Region
- Coordinates: 40°50′19″N 47°14′09″E
- Country: Azerbaijan
- Rayon: Shaki

Population
  - Total: 1,560
- Time zone: UTC+4 (AZT)
  - Summer (DST): UTC+5 (AZT)

Çayqaraqoyunlu (also, Çay Qaraqoyunlu, Chaykarakoyunlu, and Chay-Karakoyunly) is a village and municipality in the Shaki Rayon of Azerbaijan. It has a population of 1,560.
