= Deuda (film) =

- Directed by: Jorge Lanata; Andrés G. Schaer
- Written by: Jorge Lanata; Juan Pablo Domenech
- Produced by: Cecilia Bossi
- Cinematography: Miguel Abal; José María 'Pigu' Gómez
- Edited by: Andrés G. Schaer; Sergio Zottola
- Music by: Andrés Goldstein; Daniel Tarrab
- Production company: Patagonik Film Group
- Distributed by: Buena Vista International
- Release date: 7 October 2004
- Running time: 90 minutes
- Country: Argentina
- Language: Spanish

Deuda (English language: Debt) is a 2004 Argentine documentary film directed and written by Jorge Lanata with Andrés G. Schaer. The film premiered on 7 October 2004 in Buenos Aires . The film was nominated for a number of Silver Condor awards for Best Documentary (Mejor Largometraje Documental) and Best Screenplay, Feature-Length Documentary (Mejor Guión Largometraje Documental) recognising directors Jorge Lanata and Andrés G. Schaer. At the 2005 World Soundtrack Awards the score musicians Andrés Goldstein and Daniel Tarrab were also nominated for an achievement award.

== Synopsis ==
Deuda is the story of a pursuit the search for the responsible for the televised cry of hunger of Bárbara Flores, an eight-year-old Argentine girl. The film focuses on institutional corruption in Buenos Aires, Washington, the International Monetary Fund (IMF), the World Bank and general international bureaucratic lack of interest. The film also includes interviews with high ranking IMF officials including Anne Kreuger.
