= Vicki Lansky =

American author

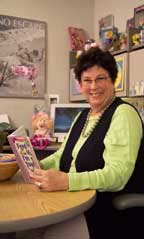
- Born: Vicki Lee Rogosin; January 6, 1942; Louisville, Kentucky, U.S.
- Died: January 15, 2017 (aged 75); Plymouth, Minnesota, U.S.
- Occupations: Writer, publisher
- Spouse: S. Bruce Lansky (1967-1983; divorced)
- Children: 2

Vicki Lee Lansky (née Rogosin; January 6, 1942 – January 15, 2017) was an American author and publisher, best known for her cookbook Feed Me I'm Yours.

Feed Me I'm Yours began as a local fund-raising cookbook for the Minneapolis chapter of the Childbirth Education Association (CEA) in 1974. Lansky, then a new mother and recent transplant to suburban Minneapolis from New York City, was not familiar with local group 'favorite-recipe' fund-raising cookbooks. But Lansky, then a stay-at-home mom and CEA volunteer, suggested the idea at a meeting.

CEA agreed to try the idea, whereupon Lansky rounded up five friends, some from CEA and some not, to help her with the project. She then presented an outline of a cookbook that would be of interest to new mothers, beginning with making baby food. With only two groups working in meetings and only one name suggested for the cookbook, the project was presented to CEA, who quickly agreed to fund the book's first printing.

In the Sunday food section of the Minneapolis Star and Tribune (December 1, 1974 issue), food editor Mary Hart featured Lansky and the cookbook. This inspired Lansky and her husband Bruce, who had worked in sales and marketing, to start a publishing company. Meadowbrook Press (named after Meadowbrook Lane where the couple lived) was created to sell Feed Me I'm Yours nationally. When the couple's marriage ended in the early 1980s, however, so did the business partnership; in the divorce settlement, her husband got the business, while she got their lake-front home.

== Books ==
Lansky's first book is still one of the highest-selling baby/toddler food cookbooks in the United States, which has sold over 3 million copies. Lansky followed the book with Taming of the C.A.N.D.Y. (Continuously Advertised Nutritionally-Deficient Yummies) Monster, which landed as #1 on The New York Times Best Seller list on April 30, 1978 after an appearance on The Phil Donahue Show.

Her parenting newsletter was recommended by Ann Landers on December 17, 1981, and was described by the New York Times as 'the most original' of its kind. The newsletter's parenting tips were incorporated into a later book, Practical Parenting Tips for the First Five Years, which has sold over 700,000 copies.

In the 1980s, Bantam Books published Lansky's first single-topic parenting titles after she left Meadowbrook Press. The list includes: Toilet Training: A Practical Guide to Daytime and Nighttime Training (1993, 2003); Birthday Parties, Best Party Tips & Ideas For Ages 1-8 (1986, 1995); Dear Babysitter Handbook (1992, 2001); Welcoming Your Second Baby (1984, 2005); Getting Your Child to Sleep...and Back to Sleep (1985, 2004); Trouble-Free Travel with Children (1991, 2004); and Baby-Proofing Basics (1991, 2002).

Her children/parent read-together books include KoKo Bear's New Potty, A New Baby at KoKo Bear's House, KoKo Bear and the New Babysitter, and KoKo Bear's Big Earache, which last helps children prepare for ear tube surgery. Lansky later self-published these titles through Book Peddlers, which she established to distribute her own titles as well as those by others.

On the sixth anniversary of her divorce NAL/Signet published Vicki Lansky's Divorce Book for Parents: Helping Children Cope with Divorce and Its Aftermath. In an interview, Lansky stated: "I read what was available on divorce but no one book had all I needed in one place so I wrote the one I wished I could have found for myself... I wrote a book to help other parents get through that tough time." The book was reprinted in 1996 by her own press, Book Peddlers. The book received a Parent's Choice Book award. According to the New York Times review of the book, "It's the one to read through your fears and tears".

Her companion children's book, It's Not Your Fault, KoKo Bear, is intended for children 3–7 years coping with divorce. And in the midst of the Beanie Baby frenzy of that time, Lansky created KoKo Bear: the Divorce Doll for Kids. Lansky was interviewed by Meredith Vieira on The View, where she introduced the KoKo Bear doll to a national audience. KoKo Bear comes with a small backpack which encourages children to write down their worries and stuff them into the backpack so that KoKo Bear—not the children—can carry them.

In 1988, Lansky received a call from the new editor at Family Circle magazine. The publication was looking for a new household hints columnist, which opportunity allowed Lansky to go from writing tips for young children to tips for adults. Lansky had since written and published several household hints books, including the bestsellers Baking Soda: Over 500 Fabulous, Fun and Frugal Uses, with over 500,000 copies sold, and Vinegar: Over 400 Various, Versatile and Very Good Uses (2004) with over 350,000 copies sold.

== Media ==
Lansky was a Sunday columnist for the Minneapolis Star Tribune from 1985 to 1987, a contributing editor to Family Circle magazine for more than eight years, and wrote a monthly column for Sesame Street Parents magazine from 1987 to 1997. Lansky's media appearances over the years have included The Rosie O'Donnell Show, The View, CBS This Morning, The Oprah Winfrey Show, The Phil Donahue Show, CNN, PM Magazine, Attitudes (on Lifetime Cable), Hour Magazine, Smart Solutions (HGTV), The 700 Club, and The Today Show.

She has been featured in several major national magazines and held a parenting spot for a year on AP Radio in 1983. She taped TV segments for Help! Around the House and Home Matters, and has appeared on QVC. Two of her divorce articles can be found on the Huffington Post.

Lansky worked as a spokesperson for Arm & Hammer Baking Soda (January 2001/BSMG), the Dole Family Advisory Board (March 2000/Londre Company), Mead Johnson's Enfamil (December 1999/BSMG), and P&G's Bounce fabric softener sheets (July 1997/Marina Mahr). In 2005 she worked with 3M as part of the 75th anniversary celebration of the invention of Scotch Tape.

In 2002, Lansky was named Minnesota publisher of the year by the Midwest Independent Publishers Association.

== Personal life ==
Lansky was born in Louisville, Kentucky. At age 13, her family moved to Mount Vernon, New York. She graduated from A. B. Davis High School. After receiving a B.A. from Connecticut College, she worked in New York City in the retail clothing industry.

She married S. Bruce Lansky in 1967. In 1971 the couple moved with their first child to Minneapolis where he had taken a new job. When they divorced in 1983, Vicki and Bruce co-parented their children, with the kids living one week with each parent. Today most of Lansky's books are published by Book Peddlers and are distributed by Publishers Group West (PGW) to book outlets and in eBook format, as well as by mail or online through Practical Parenting. Lansky married Stephen M. Schaefer in 2008 just as she was updating 101 Ways to Tell Your Sweetheart "I Love You".

== Death ==
Lansky died on January 15, 2017, aged 75, in hospice care at her home in Trillium Woods in Plymouth, Minnesota from cirrhosis. She was survived by her two children and three grandchildren.

== Controversy ==
In his November 11, 2010, article on Cracked.com, popular internet writer Seanbaby pointed out that Lanksy had reused whole passages from an earlier work for the book 101 Ways to say I Love You, claiming that she had "tricked [him] into buying this terrible book twice!".
