= The Little Mouse =

- The Little Mouse as depicted in 'Les Secrets de la Petite Souris des dents de lait'.

In-universe information
- Gender: Undetermined
- Origin: France
- Nationality: French

The Little Mouse, or La Petite Souris, is a fairy tale legend popular in most Francophone countries, most notably in France, and Wallonia. The legend of the Little Mouse ties in with that of the Tooth Fairy, the difference being that in this case, a little mouse sneaks in while the child is asleep, and replaces the lost baby tooth kept under their pillow with coins.

== Origin ==
Similar legends exist in Hispanic culture, such as Ratoncito Pérez, as well as most South-Asian cultures from India to Japan. It was said in lore and mythology, that if the lost baby tooth of a child was found by an animal, the adult teeth that would follow would bear resemblance to the teeth of that animal. Hence, a mouse was often the animal of choice, because rodent teeth are sharp, and keep growing.

The most feasible origin of this legend, at least in the francophone context, dates back to 18th Century France, to a story penned by Marie-Catherine Le Jumel de Barneville, baronne d’Aulnoy named The Little Good Mouse (or 'La bonne petite souris'). Her story spoke of a fairy who transformed herself into a mouse to be able to defeat an evil king. The only mention of teeth in this story is when the fairy makes herself invisible and pushes the evil king from the top of a tree, making him break four teeth.

== In popular culture ==
Many interpretations of the Little Mouse or La Petite Souris have appeared in French popular culture. The mouse is often used to make children less frightened, particularly regarding concerns they may have about losing their baby teeth. In French-language media, the little mouse has also starred as the central character of quite a good number of children's books, including:

- Petite Souris album by Céline Lamour-Crochet (Author), François Martin (Illustrations)
- La petite souris et la dent by Virginie Hanna (Author), Delphine Bodet (Illustrations)
- A series of 7 books on La petite souris by Francois-Xavier Poulain (Author), Olivier Bailly (Illustrations)
- The DreamWorks film Rise of the Guardians stars a team of various characters from childhood legends popular in the United States, including Santa Claus, The Easter Bunny, Jack Frost, The Sandman and the Tooth Fairy, who is depicted as a woman with wings and a team of lesser fairies who resemble hummingbirds. However, there is a scene where one of the lesser fairies discovers a mouse under a child's pillow, and the Tooth Fairy informs her that he is "one of us, part of the European division", as a clear reference to The Little Mouse. The mouse is depicted as wearing a green hat with a yellow feather, and a golden belt with a coin strapped to it. He is only shown to communicate through squeaking, but the Tooth Fairy addresses him in French.
- Tales of the Tooth Fairies depicts the adventures of Martin and Gisele, two mice who travel the world retrieving teeth from children who have lost them and replacing them with a suitable gift.
