= Patagonik Film Group =

Argentine production company

- Type: Division
- Industry: Cinema of Argentina
- Founded: 1996; 30 years ago
- Headquarters: Buenos Aires
- Key people: Pablo Bossi
- Products: Films
- Revenue: ▼$89.4 million USD (2009)
- Operating income: ▼$11 million USD (2009)
- Owners: Clarín Group (33.3%); Disney Argentina (33.3%); Cinecolor (33.3%)
- Parent: Buena Vista International (33.3%)
- Website: Patagonik Film Group

Patagonik Film Group is an Argentine production company, dedicated to the making of feature films and film production services. A part of the Clarín Group, Patagonik Film Group also assists in the production of international films that want to film in Argentina.

The company is also known for its visual effects design, computer animation, character design and compositing. Some of their animated films include: Patoruzito ("Little Patoruzú"), Condor Crux, El Mercenario, El Ratón Pérez, El Arca, and the three installments of Dibu series.

== History ==
Patagonik Film Group was established in 1996 by Pablo Bossi.

Buena Vista International Latin America, Telefonica, and Argentina-based Clarin became owners of Patagonik in 1997.

They were in charge of the production of the film Evita, by Alan Parker, and the video "Love Don't Live Here Anymore" by Madonna.

In 1997, Patagonik produced Cenizas del paraíso, directed by Marcelo Piñeyro, a box office success and was awarded Best Foreign Feature Film at the Goya Awards.

The same year Dibu: la película was released. The children's film, which blended animation and real footage, was based on a famous television character, and was a success in Argentina.

Since then, Patagonik Film Group has produced over 30 feature films, among them Fabián Bielinsky's Nueve Reinas, which beat audience records and achieved important awards worldwide.

By April 2007, The Walt Disney Company Argentina and Artear owned a large stake of the company and Pol-ka was in process of purchasing a majority stake in the company.

== Filmography ==
- Evita (1996)
- Cenizas del paraíso (1997)
- Dibu: La película (1997)
- Sus ojos se cerraron y el mundo sigue andando (1997)
- El Juguete rabioso (1998)
- Dibu 2: La venganza de Nasty (1998)
- Cohen vs. Rosi (1998)
- Nueve reinas (2000)
- Almejas y mejillones (2000)
- Los Pintin al rescate (2000)
- Apariencias (2000)
- Una noche con Sabrina Love (2000)
- Cóndor Crux, la leyenda (2000)
- El Hijo de la Novia (2001)
- Kamchatka (2002)
- Valentín (2002)
- Dibu 3 (2002)
- Apasionados (2002)
- El Último tren (2002)
- El Alquimista impaciente (2002)
- No dejaré que no me quieras (2002)
- Todas las azafatas van al cielo (2002)
- Nowhere (2002)
- En la ciudad sin límites (2002)
- Ciudad del sol (2003)
- Cleopatra (2003)
- Vivir Intentando (2003)
- Palermo Hollywood (2004)
- Deuda (2004)
- Peligrosa obsesión (2004)
- Un Mundo menos peor (2004)
- Patoruzito (2004)
- Seres queridos (2004)
- The Whore and the Whale (2004)
- El Aura (2005)
- El Tigre escondido (2005)
- Hermanas (2005)
- El Ratón Pérez (2006)
- Patoruzito: La gran aventura (2006)
- Remake (2006)
- El Arca (2007)
- High School Musical: el desafio (2008)
- La Señal (2008)
- Un novio para mi mujer (2008)
- Igualita a mi (2010)
- Retornos (2010)
- El gato desaparece (2011)
- Viudas (2011)
- 7 Sea Pirates (2012)
- Extraños en la noche (2012)
- Elefante Blanco (2012)
- Dos más dos (2012)
