= South Star (film) =

- Movie poster for Estrella del sur
- Spanish: Estrella del sur
- Directed by: Gabriel González Rodríguez
- Written by: Gabriel González Rodríguez
- Starring: Julieth Restrepo
- Cinematography: Leo Cubillos
- Music by: Daniel Carvajalino Murcia
- Release date: February 24, 2013
- Running time: 112 minutes
- Country: Colombia
- Language: Spanish

South Star (Spanish: Estrella del Sur) is a 2013 Colombian drama film written and directed by Gabriel González Rodríguez.

== Plot ==
A group of teenagers attend a public school in Bogotá where violence is common. The movie is focused around four main characters. Despite their environment, they endeavour to pursue their dreams. One of these includes their dream to see the sea ie; Go to the coast which is facilitated by their new literature teacher who arrives at their school. Leaflets begin to appear in their neighborhood indicating that anyone who uses drugs or gets into trouble after 10 p.m. will be killed by the Black Hand, a social cleansing organization. Leaving the teenagers to seek an escape from their situation.

== Production and awards ==
The film was written and directed by Gabriel González Rodríguez. It made its premiere on February 24, 2013, at the Cartagena International Film Festival. It was awarded La Llave de la Libertad Award at the Huelva Ibero-American Film Festival. Julieth Restrepo won the best actress award at the 2013 Macondo Awards.

== Cast ==
- Soraya Ramirez: Julieth Restrepo
- Antonio: David Trejos
- Gerson: Biassini Segura
- Mónica: Carolina Galeano
- Wilson: Alejandro Prieto

== Reception ==
In 2016, film critic Jeronimo Rivera-Betancur of El Tiempo rated the film at No. 40 on his list of his favorite Colombian fiction films.
