= Veit Helmer =

German film director and screenwriter (born 1968)

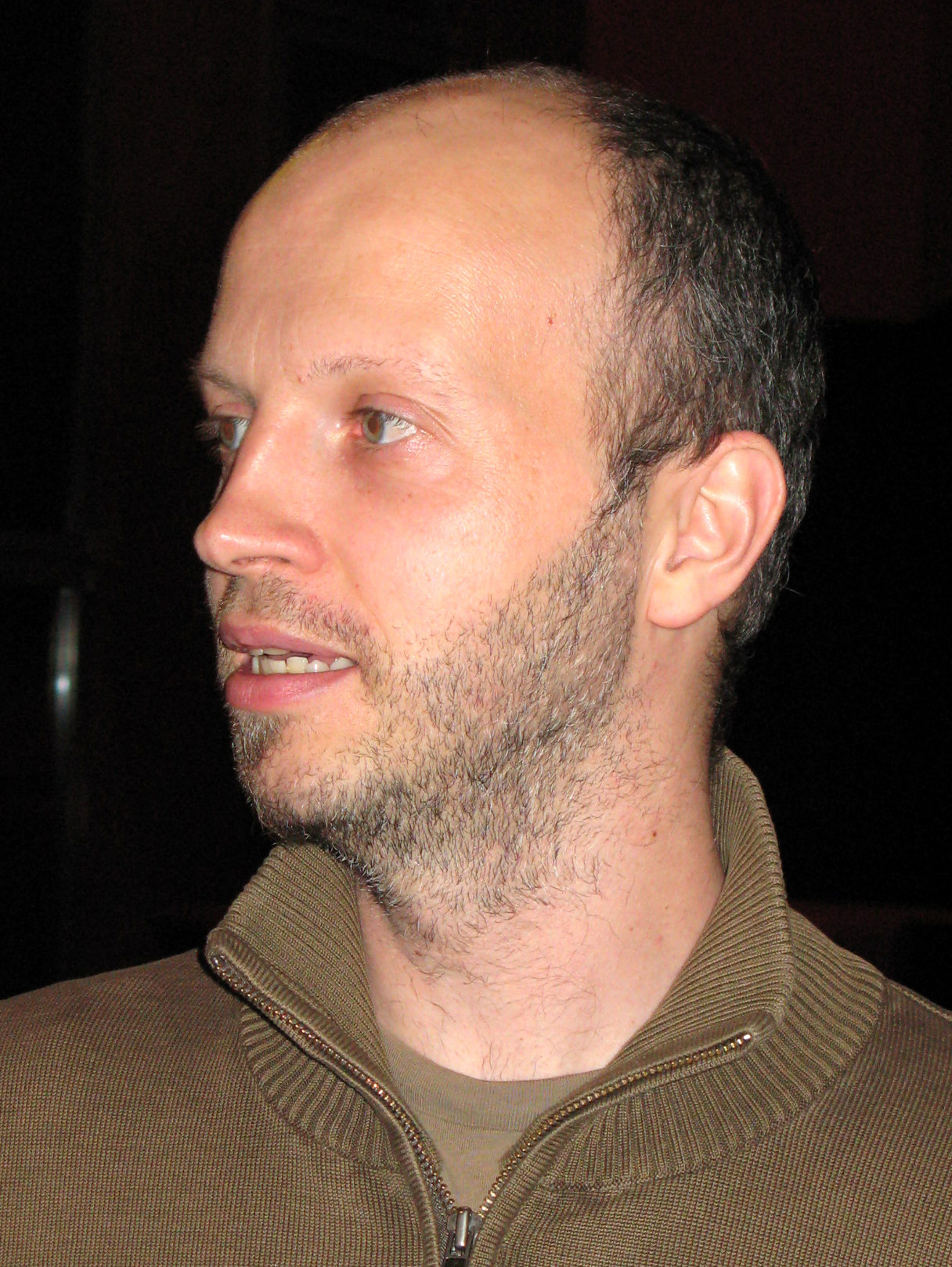
- Veit Helmer in 2008
- Born: 24 April 1968 (age 58); Hanover, West Germany
- Occupations: Film director, screenwriter
- Years active: 1989-present

Veit Helmer (born 24 April 1968) is a German film director and screenwriter. He started shooting films at the age of fourteen. After finishing school he was trainee at German TV station NDR. Two month before the wall came down, he moved to East-Berlin to study theatre directing at the famous drama school "Ernst Busch". From 1991 to 1997 Helmer studied film directing at HFF Munich. His first feature film Tuvalu (starring Denis Lavant and Chulpan Khamatova) earned more than 32 awards. His 2008 film Absurdistan was premiered in Sundance and entered into the 30th Moscow International Film Festival.

== Selected filmography ==
Film
Year	Title	Role	Notes
2023	Gondola	Director & Screenwriter	
2018	The Bra	Director & Screenwriter	
2014	Fiddlesticks	Director & Screenwriter	
2011	Baikonur	Director & Screenwriter	
2008	Absurdistan	Director & Screenwriter	
1999	Tuvalu	Director & Screenwriter	
1995	A Trick of Light	Screenwriter	
1995	Surprise!	short	
