= Noah's Ark (2007 film) =

- Argentine theatrical release poster
- Directed by: Juan Pablo Buscarini
- Written by: Axel Nacher; Fernando Schmidt; Enrique Cortés (screenplay adaptation); Barbara Di Girolamo; Juan Pablo Buscarini (script collaborator)
- Produced by: Pablo Bossi; Alejandro Cacetta; Roberto Di Girolamo; Juan Pablo Galli; Giuliana Migani; Ariel Saúl; Camillo Teti; Patricio Tobal; Juan Vera
- Edited by: Daniele Campelli; Massimo Croce; César Custodio
- Music by: Andrés Goldstein; Daniel Tarrab
- Production company: Patagonik Film Group
- Distributed by: Buena Vista International (Argentina); Eagle Pictures (Italy)
- Release date: 5 July 2007
- Running time: 88 minutes
- Countries: Argentina; Italy
- Language: Spanish
- Box office: $6.8 million

Noah's Ark (Spanish: El Arca) is a 2007 animated comedy film directed by Juan Pablo Buscarini. Based on the biblical story of Noah's Ark, its story is told from the animals' point of view. The film tends to follow the traditional story, with the animals being anthropomorphic.

== Plot ==
Animals and humans personify the seven deadly sins: Pride (represented as a peacock), Envy (represented as an anaconda), Sloth (represented as a sloth), Lust (represented as a pineapple-looking hedgehog), Gluttony (represented as a frog), Wrath (represented as a baboon), and Greed (represented as an indigenous man). This results in their doom, as they are killed or captured and taken to market (where the killed animals are sold and survivors are enslaved). God sees the market and its evils, and tells an Angel that he will destroy the world. An encounter with gentle, devoted Noah, who purchases the freedom of an enslaved man despite his own poverty, convinces him to give humanity one last chance.

God appears as a heavenly light to Noah, telling him to build a large ark for his family and two of every animal to survive a flood. Noah tells his family, who thinks he is crazy. He sells his home for a flock of doves to deliver messages to all the animals, but all the doves except Pepe fail in the mission. Pepe is rescued from attacking animals by the kind lioness Kairel, secretary for the aging King Sabu and Queen Oriana. Kairel delivers Noah's message to Sabu, who calls an emergency meeting of the animals. Sabu's spoiled son, Xiro, receives half of the letter torn from a window therefore misinterprets Noah's message as an invitation to a luxury cruise. Xiro is angry when Kairel disqualifies his cruise guests, and the tiger Dagnino hopes to rule the post-flood world's animal kingdom.

Noah finishes the ark, and the animals arrive. Kairel has been sent to organize and supervise the trip, but the herbivores demand assurance that the carnivores will not eat them once they're aboard. Dagnino says that he will punish any act of violence on the voyage. It begins raining, and the animals stampede onto the ark. Xiro grabs Kairel and brings her aboard the ark after his intended mate is crushed by a hippopotamus.

Farfan and Esther, who bought Noah's cottage, see the ark in the distance. Panicking as the water rises around them, they scramble onto the ark. Kairel tries to maintain order and convince Xiro to take his duties seriously, but Xiro flees to a club. He becomes infatuated with the dancing panther Panthy, part of Dagnino's cabal of carnivores who intend to rule the prey species.

After he gets the full letter, Xiro faces the situation and tries to govern. He grows closer to Kairel, but is still infatuated with Panthy. Below deck with the animals, Farfan and Esther disguise themselves as a fictional "grasswhopper" species to avoid discovery. Under a pile of dung hauled to the deck for disposal, Farfan, Esther (chased by Noah) and Noah fall into the depths of the ark. Noah's eldest son, Japheth, volunteers to rescue him; the injured Pepe cannot fly. Noah's sons break the helm.

Farfan and Esther knock Noah unconscious and abandon him. Farfan bullies the smaller animals and hits Dagnino, who tears off the lower half of his disguise. Panthy lures Xiro to her cabin, where Dagnino's henchmen use the disguise and tomato juice to frame Xiro for the murder of the grasswhoppers. Dagnino has Xiro locked in a storeroom, but Xiro's herbivore friends convince Kairel of the truth.

Noah regains consciousness and tends to Pepe before sending him out a porthole to find land. Xiro's friends free him and he confronts Dagnino, who has captured the other herbivores. Their battle ends when the ark, having drifted into the Arctic, hits an ice floe.

The animals panic again, threatening to flee until Xiro rallies them. Noah has returned to his family on deck, and they begin repairing the helm. God allows the angel to stop the rain. Xiro realizes that the pitch for the ship's torches will melt the ice, and the animals spread barrels of it across the floe. Xiro lights the pitch, freeing the ark. Farfan and Esther, believing the ark has run aground, fall onto the floe as the ark departs; they flee the hungry polar bears, who are remaining in their natural habitat.

Pepe returns to the ark with an olive leaf. Xiro and Kairel reconcile as the animals (including a caged Panthy and Dagnino's gang, stuck in a wall board) celebrate on the deck. God enjoys the festivities but admonishes the angel for leaving the rainbow on; they bicker about God's work (the Bible) in progress.

== English-language cast ==
- James Keller as Xiro, a lion with a black mane who is the main protagonist and the son of King Sabu and Queen Oriana. Although he is a predator, he is friends with herbivores. Keller also voiced Farfan, a bald con artist with green skin.
- Chloe Dolandis as Kairel, Xiro's love interest who is an aide to Queen Orianna
- Joe Carey as Noah, with a long grey-and-white beard, glasses and simple maroon clothes.
- Wayne LeGette as Dagnino, a manipulative bengal tiger who wants to become king of the animals.
- Heather Gallagher as Panthy, a seductive black panther
- Ron von Paulus as God, a muscular man with tan skin and blonde hair.
- Tom Wahl as Bombay, an orangutan who is Xiro's spiritual guide.
- Andrio Chavarro as Angel, God's aide, who does his work (including writing his book, and asking him for advice).
- Kay Brady as Naamah, Noah's wife, who tries to keep her family together.
- Andrio Chavarro as Japheth, Noah's oldest child, heavy-set with red hair, a beard and blue clothes.
- Brandon Morris as Ham, Noah's middle child and his only African one, with a large black Afro and red clothes.
- Amy London as Esther, the other con artist, with red hair and earrings.
- Lissa Grossman as Miriam, one of Noah's daughters-in-law, who is married to Ham. She has red hair and blue clothes.
- Loren Lusch as Sara, another of Noah's daughters-in-law, who is married to Shem; she has dark hair and wears white clothes.
- Aubrey Shavonn as Edith, the last of Noah's daughters-in-law, who is married to Japheth. She has blonde hair and wears red clothes.
- Oscar Cheda as King Sabu, an elderly lion who gives up his place on the ark.
- Heidi Harris as Queen Oriana, the wife of King Sabu and queen of the animals before the flood. Harris also voices Bruma, a lioness
- Terrell Hardcastle as Pepe, a dove.
- Antonio Amadeo as Pity, a parrot that acts as the entertainer on the ark.
- Danny Paul as Coco, a saltwater crocodile
- Todd Allen Durkin as Patricio, a vulture who sits on Coco's shoulder.
- Gerald Owens as Cachito, a muscular puma
- Barry Tarallo as Wolfgang, a wolf who is friends with Dagnino
- Rayner Grannchen as Alvaro, a pig who becomes friends with Xiro.
- Deborah Sherman Gorelo as Lily, Bombay's love interest.

== Spanish-language cast ==
- Juan Carlos Mesa as Noé
- Jorge Guinzburg as Farfan
- Mariana Fabbiani as Miriam
- Alejandro Fantino as Jafet
- Magdalena Ruiz Guiñazú as Reina Leona Oriana
- Lalo Mir as Pity
- Alejandro Dolina as Puma Cachito
- Diego Topa as Palomo Pepe

== Home media ==
Noah's Ark was released on DVD in the United States by Shout! Factory on March 11, 2014, with an English track and a Spanish audio track with English subtitles. It omits several scenes from the original 2007 film, mainly the scenes that were less appropriate for young children.
