= Luis Coloma =

Spanish author (1851–1915)

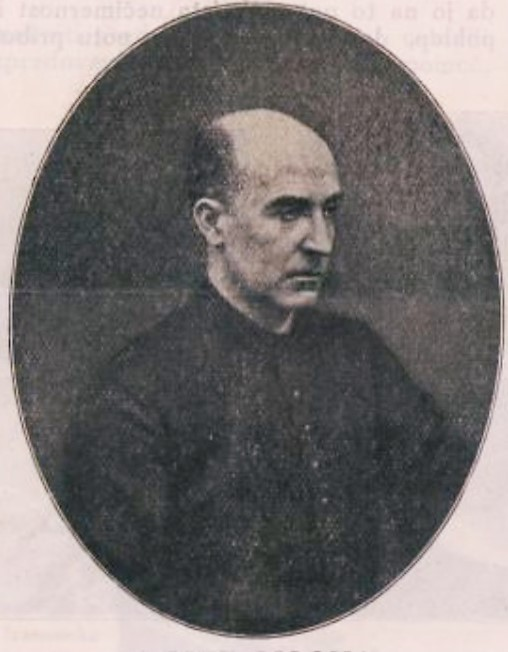
- Born: Luis Coloma Roldán; 9 January 1851; Jerez de la Frontera (Cádiz), Spain
- Died: 10 June 1915 (aged 64); Madrid, Spain
- Other name: Padre Coloma

Seat f of the Real Academia Española
- In office 6 December 1908 – 10 June 1915
- Preceded by: Valentín Gómez Gómez
- Succeeded by: Wenceslao Ramírez de Villa-Urrutia

Luis Coloma Roldán (1851–1915) was a Spanish writer, journalist and Jesuit. He is most known for creating the character of El Ratoncito Pérez. Coloma was a prolific writer of short stories and his complete works, which includes his novels, biographies, and other works, have since been collected in a multi-volume set. He studied at the University of Seville, where he graduated with a master's degree in law, although he never got to practice law. In 1908 Coloma became a member of the Royal Spanish Academy occupying seat "f".

== Career ==
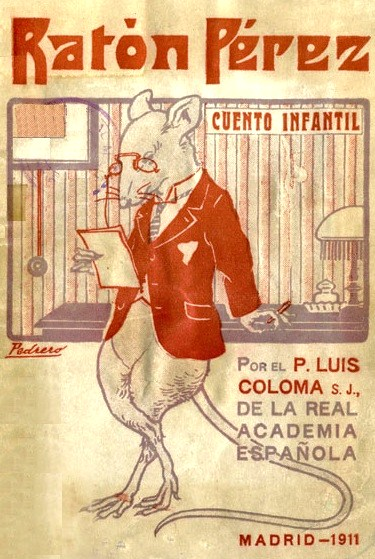
Cover of the 1911 first edition of the Ratón Pérez tale by Coloma, illustrated by Mariano Pedrero

Coloma was born in 1851 in Jerez de la Frontera.

In 1880 Coloma began work on Pequeñeces on behalf of the Society of Jesus. The work is a political satire of the high Madrid society in the years previous to the Bourbon Restoration, and is considered to be one of his more well known works. This work has received much criticism, as some felt that it was overly pessimistic and "too narrowly bigoted in tone to have any lasting vogue".

In 1894, Queen Maria Christina commissioned Coloma to write a tale for King Alfonso XIII, who had just lost a tooth at the age of eight. Coloma's tale follows Ratón Pérez who lived with his family in a box of cookies at the basement of Prast confectionery store in Madrid, but frequently ran away from home through the pipes of the city, and into the bedrooms of children who had lost their teeth. The story details how he cunningly misleads any cats in the vicinity who may be lurking, and includes his interaction with King Buby (Queen Maria Christina's nickname for Alfonso XIII). The tale was first published in 1902 together with other stories in Nuevas lecturas. In 1911, Ratón Pérez was published for the first time as an independent story and was illustrated by Mariano Pedrero. Coloma's original manuscript, with his signature and a dedication to King Alfonso XIII, is now kept in the vault of the Royal Library at the Royal Palace of Madrid.

Coloma promoted literature but was critical of novels in general, as he felt that they gave an overly idealized portrayal of human life and sentimentalized religion. In his later years Coloma only published biographies and writings of a historical nature, such as Jeromín, which focused on Don Juan de Austria.

Coloma died in 1915 in Madrid.

== Adaptations ==
Several of Coloma's works have been adapted into film and for television. Boy has been adapted into a feature film twice, once in 1926 and again in 1940. Pequeñeces was adapted into a 1971 television series as well as a 1950 film. Jeromín was adapted into a 1953 film. El Ratoncito Pérez was adapted into a 2006 film and its sequel in 2008.

== Bibliography ==
- Complete Works, Madrid: Editorial Reason and Faith, 1942, 19 vols. 2 novels, 41 short stories, 6 historical biographies, academic discourse and two religious books
- Solaces de un estudiante (1871)
- Lecturas recreativas (1884)
- Pequeñeces (Trivialities) (1890–91) kn El Mensajero del Corazón de Jesús
- Cuentos para niños (1890) in El Mensajero del Corazón de Jesús
- Retratos de antaño (1895)
- Boy (1895–96)
- La reina mártir (1898), biography of Mary Stuart
- Jeromín (1902), novel about the life of Juan de Austria
- El marqués de Mora (1903)
- Recuerdos de Fernán Caballero (1910)
- Fray Francisco (1911), biography of Cardinal Francisco Jiménez de Cisneros
