= Tuvalu (film) =

1999 film

- Theatrical release poster
- Directed by: Veit Helmer
- Written by: Michaela Beck; Veit Helmer; Lyudmila Merdzhanska
- Produced by: Vladimir Andreev
- Starring: Denis Lavant; Chulpan Khamatova; Philippe Clay
- Cinematography: Emil Hristow
- Edited by: Araksi Muhibyan
- Music by: Goran Bregović; Jürgen Knieper
- Production company: Veit Helmer Filmproduktion
- Distributed by: Buena Vista International
- Release dates: 16 October 1999 (Chicago International Film Festival); 19 November 1999 (Mar del Plata Film Festival); 7 December 1999 (Taipei Golden Horse Film Festival); 22 June 2000 (Germany)
- Running time: 101 minutes
- Country: Germany
- Language: Various

Tuvalu is a 1999 experimental film from Germany. The style evokes early 20th-century silent movies and motifs commonly found in German expressionism. The sparse dialog is presented in a mix of European languages. The film stars Denis Lavant as Anton and Chulpan Khamatova as Eva.

The film focuses on Anton as he tries to win the heart of Eva and save his family's bath house from the wrecking ball.

== See also ==
- Cinema of Germany
