= Dibu 3 =

Dibu 3: La gran aventura
- DVD cover
- Directed by: Raúl Rodríguez Peila
- Written by: Ricardo Rodríguez; Alejandro Sapognikoff
- Produced by: Pablo Bossi; Juan Pablo Buscarini
- Starring: Alejandro Awada
- Cinematography: Juan Carlos Lenardi
- Edited by: César Custodio
- Music by: Eduardo Frigerio
- Production company: Patagonik Film Group
- Distributed by: Buena Vista International
- Release date: July 18, 2002
- Running time: 85 minutes
- Country: Argentina
- Language: Spanish

Dibu 3: La gran aventura (English language: Dibu 3: The Great Adventure) is a 2002 Argentine family adventure film incorporating animated figures directed by Raúl Rodríguez Peila. The film is based on a book by Enrique Silberstein and premiered on 18 July 2002 in Buenos Aires.

== Reception ==
The film earned a total cinema gross of $240,792 and took $19,262 on its first weekend, shown at 32 cinemas across Argentina. The film was nominated for a Silver Condor Award for Best Animated Film in 2003.

== Main cast ==
- Alejandro Awada .... Professor Doxon
- Germán Kraus .... José "Pepe" Medina
- Stella Maris Closas .... Marcela Medina
- Alberto Anchart .... Atilio
- Paula Siero .... Ingeniera Ramos
- Rodrigo Noya .... Martín
- Daniel Valenzuela .... Agente Side
- Marcelo Alfaro .... General
- Alejandro Muller .... Técnico
- Cecilia Gispert .... Dibu (voz)
- Laura Sordi .... Buji (voz)
- Edgardo Moreira .... Presidente
- Tito Lorefice .... Drom (voz)
- Lucila Gómez .... Grumi (voz)
- Gabriel Molinelli .... Astronauta Jefe
- Adrián Loffi .... Astronauta 2
- Camila MacLennan .... Mujer assistante
- Pablo Marteletti .... Radioactivo 1
- Alfredo Aguirre .... Radioactivo 2
- Hernán Jiménez .... Batman
- Martín Dahab .... Malabarista
- Hernán Gómez .... Lanzallamas
- Camila Dángelo .... Niña intellectual
- Carlos Kaspar .... Sabio 1/Presidente
- Rufino Gallo .... Sabio 2/Presidente
- Tony Middleton .... Presidente de los EE.UU.
- Luciana Godoy .... Receta de Cocina

== See also ==
- List of animated feature-length films
- Dibu
