= The Beloved (2026 film) =

2026 film by Rodrigo Sorogoyen

- Spanish theatrical release poster
- Spanish: El ser querido
- Directed by: Rodrigo Sorogoyen
- Screenplay by: Isabel Peña; Rodrigo Sorogoyen
- Produced by: Nacho Lavilla; Eduardo Villanueva
- Starring: Javier Bardem; Victoria Luengo
- Cinematography: Álex de Pablo
- Edited by: Alberto del Campo
- Music by: Olivier Arson
- Production companies: Caballo Films; Movistar Plus+; El Ser Querido AIE; Le Pacte
- Distributed by: A Contracorriente Films (Spain); Le Pacte (France)
- Release dates: 16 May 2026 (Cannes); 16 May 2026 (France); 26 August 2026 (Spain)
- Running time: 135 minutes
- Countries: Spain; France
- Language: Spanish
- Box office: US$6.6 million

The Beloved (Spanish: El ser querido) is a 2026 drama film directed by Rodrigo Sorogoyen, who wrote the screenplay with Isabel Peña. The plot follows an acclaimed film director (Javier Bardem) who casts his estranged daughter (Victoria Luengo) in a period piece, exploring the mishaps that arise on set.

The film had its world premiere at the 79th Cannes Film Festival on 16 May 2026, in competition for the Palme d'Or, on the same day as its theatrical rollout in France by Le Pacte, ahead of its Spanish theatrical release by A Contracorriente Films on 26 August 2026. It received positive reviews, with special praise for its direction and acting.

== Plot ==
After 13 years of estrangement, acclaimed director Esteban Martínez meets with his daughter Emilia Vera in a restaurant and offers her a role in his next project, a film titled Desierto set in 1930s Western Sahara, when the territory was a Spanish colony. Emilia needs to think about it and they show disagreements about past memories, including Esteban bringing grievances about Emilia's mother, Charo, a former actress.

Already filming in Fuerteventura, French producer Marina is not entirely convinced with Emilia's part. Esteban invites Emilia to a dinner with the lead actors, including César, Bárbara, Raúl, and the Moroccan actor who plays the part of a Sahrawi sepherd. Emilia rejects the invitation preferring to set a distance with Esteban, resting in her room or bonding with the focus puller Malena and other below-the-line crew members. While in Fuerteventura, Esteban is doing a voice commentary of his breaktrough film Siroco. Invited by Esteban, Emilia has an awkward get-together with him, his two younger sons and his partner Alice. After discussing about the filming in Esteban's room, Esteban suggests Emilia to stop drinking alcohol. Emilia makes it clear that she is in there to play her part, not to have a father-daughter relationship with Esteban.

While shooting a group scene depicting a meal featuring Raúl, Bárbara, César, and Emilia (among others) and upon trigger by Esteban's dissatisfaction with the way the actors perform the eating part as well as their attitude, Esteban gets increasingly angrier with each take and ends up focusing his rage on Emilia. As the entire cinematography team is leaving the production for good after the brouhaha and bad blood caused by Esteban, Esteban tries to aggressively persuade DoP Pepa in her hotel room to remain, to no avail. Esteban and Marina agree on signing another cinematographer, reputed Nikai, to step in on Pepa's shoes. After two days off, the crew resumes the shooting. Emilia makes Esteban to understand the suffering the years of paternal absence caused in Emilia's life. After Emilia leaves the island once she completed her part in the film, she returns to her job as a waiter.

== Cast ==
- Javier Bardem as Esteban Martínez
- Victoria Luengo as Emilia Vera
- Melina Matthews as Bárbara
- Marina Foïs as Marina
- Malena Villa as Malena
- Mourad Ouani as Bilal
- Pepa Gracia as Pepa
- Raúl Prieto as Raul
- Pablo Gómez-Pando as Pablo
- Raúl Arévalo as César
- Núria Prims as Charo
- Laura Birn as Alice

== Production ==
=== Development ===
Cast members Bardem and Luengo

Titled El ser querido, the project, set to be directed by Rodrigo Sorogoyen and co-written in tandem with usual collaborator Isabel Peña, was pitched by Movistar Plus+ on 18 January 2024 at a meeting at the Palacio de Santa Bárbara, providing no cast nor synopsis. Sorogoyen simply described the production as stepping out of his comfort zone. Lead cast members Javier Bardem and Victoria Luengo were first announced by Bardem himself during his reception of the Donostia Award at the 72nd San Sebastián International Film Festival in September 2024. The film is a Spanish-French co-production by Movistar Plus+, Caballo Films, and El Ser Querido AIE alongside Le Pacte, with the association of Canal+, the funding from ICAA and Creative Europe Media and backing from ICEC and the Madrid regional administration.

Additional cast members Raúl Arévalo, Marina Foïs, Mourad Ouani, Raúl Prieto, Melina Matthews, Núria Prims, Pablo Gómez-Pando, and Malena Villa were announced in January 2025 during another Movistar Plus+ presentation event. In the event, Sorogoyen joked about Bardem's role saying that "it is funny because Javier Bardem plays a film director, yesterday we did a rehearsal and he does it better than me. He starts directing and says things that I would not have thought of".

=== Filming ===
Principal photography begun in February 2025. Álex de Pablo worked as cinematographer. The start of the film was shot in digital while as in-fiction on-set conflict escalates, a mix of digital film, 35mm, 16mm and 8mm, widescreen and box formats, color and black-and-white follows. The film was shot on the island of Fuerteventura, specifically in the municipalities of Pájara and La Oliva. Some footage was also shot in Madrid. The first 18 minutes involving the two lead characters meeting in a restaurant of Madrid were shot in a single take in the first day of filming, involving no prior face-to-face meeting of Bardem and Luengo, seeking to convey better the context of two people who had not heard from each other for 13 years. Sorogoyen stated to Variety that "the main word I repeated to myself while directing The Beloved, was unequivocally 'experiment'". Alberto del Campo was the film editor.

== Release ==
The Beloved landed its world premiere on 16 May 2026 in the official selection of the 79th Cannes Film Festival, vying for the Palme d'Or. Goodfellas acquired international sales. The festival run included selections for screenings in the 'Horizons' slate of the 60th Karlovy Vary International Film Festival, as the closing film of the 16th Atlàntida Mallorca Film Fest, in the line-up of the 74th Melbourne International Film Festival, in the 'Special Presentations' slates of the 2026 Toronto International Film Festival (for its North American premiere) and 2026 Vancouver International Film Festival, in the 'Made in Spain' section of the 74th San Sebastián International Film Festival, in the 'Galas' slate of the 70th BFI London Film Festival, in the Best of the Fests selection of the 21st Rome Film Festival, in the Coca-Cola Open Air Cinema at the 32nd Sarajevo Film Festival (August 2026), the 62nd Chicago International Film Festival, the AFI Fest 2026, and the 'Gala' section of 39th Tokyo International Film Festival (October 2026).

Distributed by Le Pacte, the film opened in French theatres on the same day as its Cannes presentation, while it was released in Spanish theatres by A Contracorriente Films on 26 August 2026. Movistar Plus+ is set to release the film on streaming after the theatrical window in Spain. Movies Inspired programmed a 12 November 2026 rollout in Italian theatres.

Falcon Pictures acquired Indonesian rights to the film while Curzon purchased rights for the United Kingdom and Ireland and Kino Lorber rights for North America.

== Reception ==
=== Box office ===
As of 28 September 2026, the American website Box Office Mojo reports a $1.55 million box office gross in France. Rolling out in Spain on 26 August 2026, the film grossed around €0.2 million on its opening day. It posted a good drop (-6%) in its second weekend in Spanish theatres, with an accumulated gross of over €2.0 million. In its third weekend, it grossed €464,788 (-18% drop) and had 59,000 admissions in 335 screens. It dropped 65% after its fifth weekend, with a gross over €4 million.

=== Critical response ===
On the review aggregator website Rotten Tomatoes, 84% of 44 critics' reviews are positive, with an average rating of 7.7/10. Metacritic, which uses a weighted average, assigned the film a score of 75 out of 100, based on 14 critics, indicating "generally favorable" reviews.

Mariona Borrull of El Cultural assessed that The Beloved should be compared with Contempt (1963) or Nouvelle Vague (2025) rather than with Sentimental Value, finding it to be "a thriller-style godchild of Godard's rehearsals".

Pepa Blanes of Cadena SER described the film as a "subtle drama where the emotional intensity is always elegant, austere yet unsettling".

Wendy Ide of ScreenDaily described the film as "fierce, unflinching and insightful on the power dynamics of a film set", declaring Bardem's performance "blistering", ranking among his very best.

Lolita Mang of Vogue considered how the film gains momentum as it progresses to be its great strength, "with shame, hypocrisy and regret forming a potent cocktail".

Peter Bradshaw of The Guardian rated the "disquieting" film about emotional abuse 4 out of 5 stars, writing that "Bardem gives his scariest performance since No Country for Old Men".

Jordan Mintzer of The Hollywood Reporter wrote that "even if its elements don't always gel, The Beloved offers another prime showcase for Sorogoyen's art of unease, as well as for Bardem’s talent".

Fabien Lemercier of Cineuropa declared the film "a poignant and deeply human, spellbinding work, set in a bold and sophisticated visual style" "and masterful direction".

Owen Gleiberman of Variety billed the film as a "meaty and enjoyable entry" in the genre of movies about the making of a movie.

Damon Wise of Deadline considered The Beloved as certainly one of the best films about filmmaking since Day for Night, and perhaps the scariest since Peeping Tom.

On a surface level, Chase Hutchinson of TheWrap found the film as a potential chaotic evil twin of Sentimental Value, resulting into something "as consistently well-acted" as the former, "even if it doesn't quite reach the same heights".

Sophie Joubert of L'Humanité declared The Beloved the most thrilling film [so far] in the [Cannes main] competition, powered by "its bold stylistic approach, the breathtaking performances of its actors and the power of the themes it tackles".

Ricardo Rosado of Fotogramas rated the film 5 out of 5 stars, citing Bardem, Luengo, and Sorogoyen's ability to imbue every element of the work with narrative meaning as the best things about the film.

Elsa Fernández-Santos of El País singled out the performances delivered by Bardem and Luengo as the best things about the film, otherwise featuring a memorable opening scene, but noted the presence of several "gratuitous formal choices, such as alterations to the format and colour scheme".

David Fear of Rolling Stone deemed Bardem's performance to the best thing he "has ever done that hasn't involved a bad haircut and a coin toss".

Marta Medina del Valle of El Confidencial rated the film 4 out of 5 stars, describing it as "a complex and analytical exploration of pain and guilt", bringing attention to Luengo standing up to Bardem "in one of the most dazzling performances of her career".

Carlos F. Heredero of Caimán Cuadernos de Cine lamented that The Beloved delivers "meagre yields for such bombastic ambitions", featuring a "quite surprising" degree of dramatic insufficiency, merely resulting into "a film consisting of four sequences (strictly four) and two characters".

== Accolades ==
Year	Award	Category	Nominee(s)	Result	Ref.
2026	32nd Forqué Awards	Best Film		Pending	
2026	32nd Forqué Awards	Best Actor in a Film	Javier Bardem	Pending	
2026	32nd Forqué Awards	Best Actress in a Film	Victoria Luengo	Pending	
2027	39th European Film Awards	Best European Actor	Javier Bardem	Pending	

== See also ==
- List of Spanish films of 2026
- List of French films of 2026
