= Pablo Alamá =

Spanish actor

- Born: 1991; Valencia, Spain
- Occupation: Actor

Pablo Alamá (Valencia, b. 1991) is a Spanish television and stage actor, known for his role as Rey in the Netflix web series La noche más larga.

== Artistic Career ==
In 2021 he played the role of Manu in the comedy film Poliamor para principiantes, directed by Fernando Colomo.

In June 2022 he presented his play Manual para follarse a un macho con vagina. The work, with strong autobiographical overtones, tells his experience coming out as a trans man within a family environment that easily accepted him, normalizing the experiences of trans people.

In July of the same year, he rose to fame for his role as Rey in the Netflix series La noche más larga. In it he plays a young trans man who ends up unjustly locked in a psychiatric prison.

Alamá has spoken out in favor of greater representation for trans men and Non-binary people on television, who have historically been underrepresented in television and played by cisgender actors.

== Filmography ==
=== Movies ===
Year	Title	Role	Notes
2021	Poliamor para principiantes	Manu	
2025	La mitad de Ana	Pau	

=== Television ===
Year	Title	Role	Notes
2020	Madres. Amor y vida	Medical Resident	1 episode
2022	La noche más larga	Rey	6 episodes

== Theater ==
Year	Title	Role	Notes
2022	La celebración de los cuerpos que caen. La herida		Rodrigo Villalba
2022	Manual para follarse a un macho con vagina		Pablo Alamá
2023	Cuatro salvajes vestidos de verde hiedra		José Padilla
2024	VACÍO		Pablo Alamá
