= The Phantom of the Opera (1998 film) =

- Italian theatrical poster
- Directed by: Dario Argento
- Screenplay by: Dario Argento; Gérard Brach; Giorgina Caspari (English adaptation)
- Based on: The Phantom of the Opera; 1910 novel by Gaston Leroux
- Produced by: Claudio Argento; Giuseppe Colombo; Aron Sipos
- Starring: Julian Sands; Asia Argento
- Cinematography: Ronnie Taylor
- Edited by: Anna Napoli
- Music by: Ennio Morricone
- Production companies: Cine 2000; Focus Films; Medusa Produzione; MiBAC; Reteitalia
- Distributed by: A-Pix Entertainment; Medusa Distribuzione; Telet
- Release date: 20 November 1998
- Running time: 99 minutes
- Country: Italy
- Language: English
- Budget: $10 million

The Phantom of the Opera (Italian: Il fantasma dell'opera) is a 1998 English-language Italian romance horror film directed by Dario Argento, adapted from the 1910 novel of the same name by Gaston Leroux and starring Julian Sands and Asia Argento. It is not to be confused with the 1987 film Opera (or Terror at the Opera), also directed by Dario Argento.

The film mixes gore with gothic horror elements. In a break from tradition, the title character is not depicted as deformed and is instead classically handsome. It is his feral, animalistic behavior that sets him apart, rather than physical disfigurement.

== Plot ==
In 1877 Paris, a pack of rats save an abandoned baby from a basket that was flowing along a river. They raise him in the underground of the Opéra de Paris. This child becomes the Phantom of the Opera, a misanthrope who kills anyone who ventures into his underground chambers, just as rats are killed whenever they venture above ground. The Phantom falls in love with the young opera singer Christine Daaé while she sings alone on stage one night. He appears before her and tells her that her voice fills his heart with light. After leaving, he speaks to her using telepathy, and the two begin a romantic relationship.

The aristocratic Baron Raoul De Chagny has also fallen in love with Christine, though at first Christine offers him only a platonic relationship. Later, she ruminates that she may be in love with both men. One night, the Phantom calls to her and she descends to his lair across an underground lake in a boat. Upon arriving, she finds him playing an organ and he tells her to sing for him. Christine sings the same song he heard her sing when he first saw her onstage. After making love in his bed, the Phantom reveals his past to her. He tells her to stay in the lair while he goes to secure the role of Juliet for her, but she refuses to stay alone, causing him to storm out. Christine grows angry with him, and as he leaves in the boat, she shouts that she hates him.

The Phantom threatens Carlotta, the show's spoiled diva, not to sing but she ignores the warning. During her performance as Juliet, the Phantom brings down the chandelier, killing and injuring numerous audience members. When he returns to Christine, she refuses the role he has secured for her. He becomes angry and rapes her. After Christine awakens, she witnesses the Phantom covered in his rats and petting them. While he is playing with the rats, she escapes on the boat. She flees into the arms of Raoul, and they ascend to the roof, where they confess their love for each other. The Phantom watches and breaks down crying when he sees them kiss.

The next night Christine sings as Juliet, but the Phantom swoops down onto the stage, and she faints in his arms. Raoul and the police give chase. The Phantom carries Christine back down below and lays her down. When she awakens, he tells her that she is his, and that they will remain alone together until death. She hits his face with a rock and calls to Raoul for help but instantly regrets her actions, and her feelings for the Phantom return. Raoul appears and shoots the Phantom in his stomach with a rifle. Christine screams and cries for the Phantom, surprising Raoul.

Though mortally wounded, the Phantom's main concern becomes Christine's safety, as he fears that the police will kill her now they know she is with him. The Phantom leads them to the lake. Raoul and Christine get in the boat, but the Phantom remains on the dock and pushes the boat away. He tells Raoul to get out of the cave and out to the river. Raoul does so, ignoring Christine's screams and objections. The Phantom fights the police but is shot multiple times. He hears Christine calling him "my love" and cries out her name before being stabbed in the back, then falling into the lake and dying. The rats watch sadly as his body drowns and Christine weeps, heartbroken.

== Cast ==
- Julian Sands as The Phantom of the Opera
- Asia Argento as Christine Daaé
- Andrea Di Stefano as Raoul, Baron de Chagny
- Nadia Rinaldi as Carlotta Altieri
- Coralina Cataldi-Tassoni as Honorine
- István Bubik as The Rat Catcher
- Lucia Guzzardi as Madame Giry
- Aldo Massasso as Pourdieu
- Zoltan Barabas as Poligny
- Gianni Franco as Montluc
- David D'Ingeo as Alfred
- Kitty Kéri as Paulette
- John Pedeferri as Dr. Princard
- Leonardo Treviglio as Jerome De Chagny
- Massimo Sarchielli as Joseph Buquet

== Production ==
Argento described Arthur Lubin's Phantom of the Opera as a film that "marked his youth", leaving him "shocked and fascinated". After considering a film adaptation in the 1970s which would have been shot in Moscow and would have mixed the figures of the phantom and Rasputin, he returned to the project in 1992 while filming Trauma in Minneapolis, after casually watching the Rupert Julian's 1925 adaptation on television.

Argento shot the film between Cinecittà, the Hungarian State Opera House, the Pertosa Caves and some other caves in Slovakia. Argento had initially hoped to film at the Paris Opera, but said that its performance schedule and status as a national monument made filming there impractical. After searching for a similar theatre, he selected one in Budapest.

=== Soundtrack ===
The score was composed by Ennio Morricone and featured the "Air des clochettes" from the opera Lakmé by Léo Delibes and the overture from Charles Gounod's Faust. Morricone said in an interview that after their early-1970s collaborations he and Argento had gone separate ways for years, before Argento brought him back for The Stendhal Syndrome and The Phantom of the Opera.

== Release ==
The Phantom of the Opera was released theatrically in Italy on 20 November 1998 by Medusa. It subsequently opened in France on 3 February 1999 and Germany on 25 February, followed by releases in several other European territories. The film was released in the United Kingdom on 1 April 2000 and in Spain on 19 June 2002.

=== Home media ===
The Phantom of the Opera was released on DVD in the United States by A-Pix Entertainment in 1999. The release included widescreen and full-screen presentations, trailers and an interview with Julian Sands. In the United Kingdom, High Fliers released the film on DVD and for video rental on 2 July 2001. A DVD edition from Tartan Video followed on 29 July 2002.

The film made its Blu-ray debut in Germany in 2016 as a limited-edition mediabook, followed by standard editions in 2017 and 2018. Scorpion Releasing subsequently issued the film on Blu-ray in the United States. Plaion Pictures released a 4K Ultra HD edition in Germany on 11 December 2025. In 2026, Vinegar Syndrome released a 4K Ultra HD and Blu-ray edition in the United States, featuring a new restoration sourced from the original 35 mm camera negative, alongside archival interviews and newly produced bonus features.

In Italy, Medusa Video released the film on DVD in 2000. Another DVD edition followed on 11 December 2012, featuring behind-the-scenes material, the original theatrical trailer and other supplementary features. In 2025, Mustang Entertainment released the film on Blu-ray in Italy for the first time. The disc also included archival behind-the-scenes featurettes and a new 16-minute discussion between Claudio Pofi and film critic Mariangela Sansone.

== Reception ==
Critical response to the film was negative. While praising the visuals, set design and score, Variety called the film "a gothic kitschfest that leaves no excess unexplored", writing "none of your sanitized Andrew Lloyd Webber treatment here, but plenty of bodice-ripping, lush romanticism, gore and gross antics with rats, all of which should tickle the director's stalwart devotees. But the script's clumsy plotting, its often unintentionally hilarious dialogue and some howlingly bad acting make the already widely sold pic likely to function best as a campy video entry for irreverent genre fans." Slant Magazine called it "a hapless failure that could pass for a second-rate B movie that went straight-to-video. After the unfulfilled promises of Trauma and The Stendhal Syndrome, The Phantom of the Opera seemingly signaled the demise of a great auteur."

On Rotten Tomatoes, the film has an approval rating of 0% based on reviews from 9 critics.

=== Accolades ===
Antonello Geleng received a nomination for Best Production Design at the 1999 Nastro d'Argento awards.
