= The Cook of Castamar =

Spanish television series

- Official poster
- Spanish: La cocinera de Castamar
- Genre: Period drama; Romantic drama
- Created by: Tatiana Rodríguez
- Based on: La cocinera de Castamar by Fernando J. Muñez
- Directed by: Iñaki Peñafiel; Norberto López Amado
- Starring: Michelle Jenner; Roberto Enríquez; Hugo Silva; María Hervás; Fiorella Faltoyano
- Country of origin: Spain
- Original language: Spanish
- No. of seasons: 1
- No. of episodes: 12

Production
- Running time: 50 min (approx.)
- Production company: Buendía Estudios

Original release
- Network: Atresplayer Premium
- Release: 21 February – 9 May 2021

The Cook of Castamar (Spanish: La cocinera de Castamar) is a Spanish period drama television series adapting the novel of the same name by Fernando J. Muñez which stars Michelle Jenner and Roberto Enríquez. Set in early 18th-century Madrid, the plot follows the love story between an agoraphobic cook and a widowed nobleman. Produced by Buendía Estudios, it originally aired on Atresplayer Premium from February to May 2021.

It was also broadcast on the free-to-air channel Antena 3 from April 2021 to June 2021 and, thanks to an agreement with Netflix, the series was aired at the same time on the platform.

== Premise ==
The fiction is set in 1720 in Madrid, during the reign of Philip V. After losing her father, Clara Belmonte (Michelle Jenner) develops agoraphobia and takes refuge in the kitchens, where she feels safe. She starts working as a cook in the kitchens of the Duke of Castamar (Roberto Enríquez), marked by the tragedy of his pregnant wife's death.

== Cast ==
- Michelle Jenner as Clara Belmonte
- Roberto Enríquez as Diego de Castamar, Duke of Castamar
- Hugo Silva as Enrique de Arcona, Marquis of Soto and Campomedina
- María Hervás as Amelia Castro
- Fiorella Faltoyano as Doña Mercedes, Duchess of Rioseco
- Jean Cruz as Gabriel de Castamar
- Paula Usero as Elisa Costa
- Maxi Iglesias as Francisco Marlango, Count of Armiño
- Mónica López as Úrsula Berenguer
- Óscar Rabadán as Melquíades Elquiza
- Nancho Novo as Hernaldo de la Marca
- Silvia Abascal as Queen Isabel Farnesio
- Marina Gatell as Sol Montijos
- Carlos Serrano-Clark as Ignacio
- Joan Carreras as King Philip
- Agnès Llobet as Beatriz Ulloa
- Xenia Tostado as Alba
- Raúl Ferrando as Carlo Broschi (aka Farinelli)
- Roser Pujol as Carmen, one of the cooks
- Anna Cortés as Rosalía

== Production ==
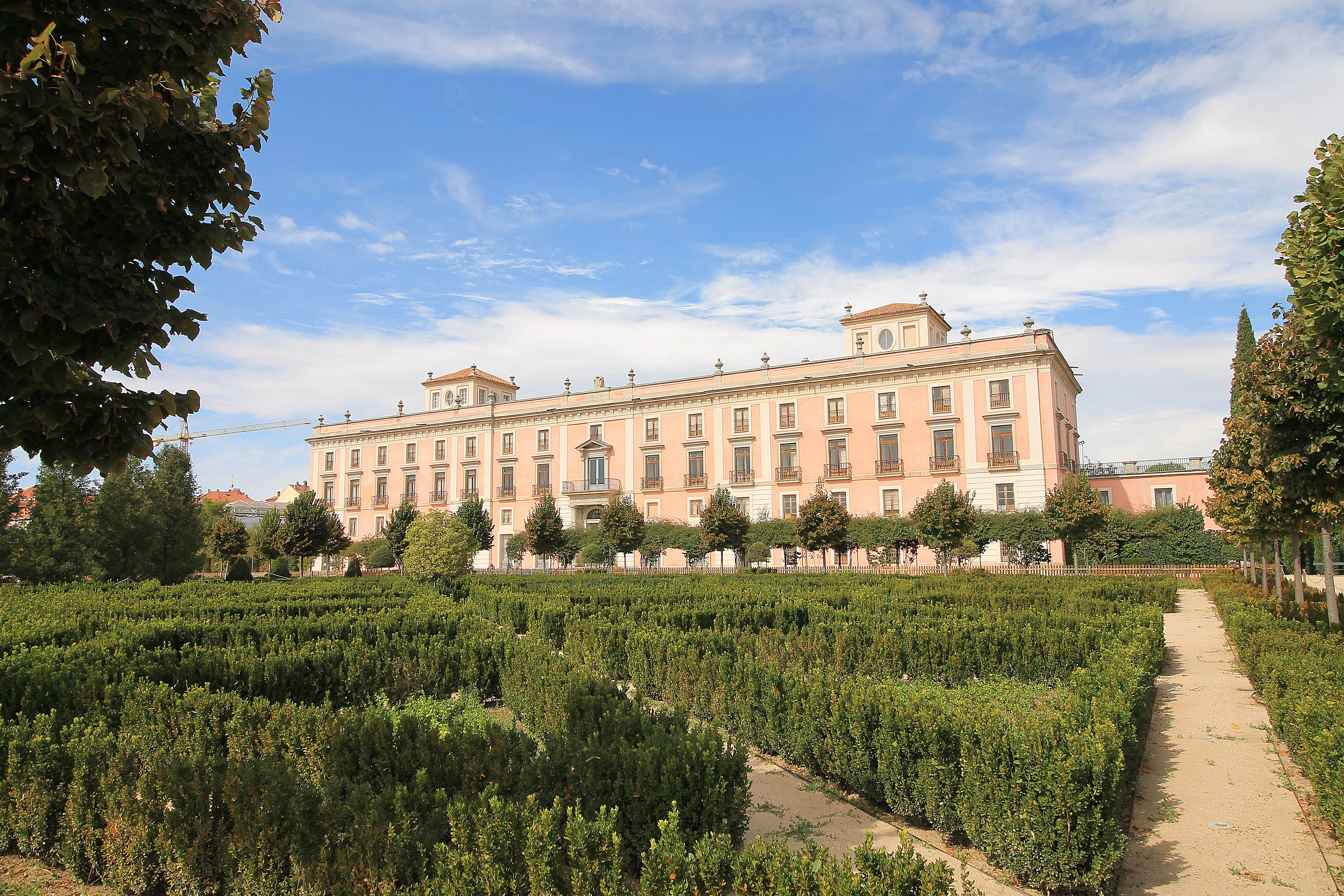
The Palacio del Infante Don Luis in Boadilla del Monte was used to recreate the fictional Palace of Castamar.

La cocinera de Castamar is an adaptation of the novel of the same name by Fernando J. Muñez. Produced by Buendía Estudios, created by Tatiana Rodríguez and directed by Iñaki Peñafiel and Norberto López Amado, the series was shot in outdoor locations in Madrid, Segovia and Cuenca. The Duke's palace, Castamar, is depicted by Palacio del Infante Don Luis in Boadilla del Monte. Filming took 4 months and ended in December 2020. The series consists of 12 episodes with a running time of roughly 50 minutes. The score is composed by Iván Palomares.

== Release and reception ==
The series premiered on 21 February 2021 on Atresplayer Premium. The weekly free-to-air broadcasting run on Antena 3 lasted from 8 April to 24 June 2021, attaining good audience ratings after adding up catch-up viewership figures to the regular linear TV figures (11.8% audience share).

== Plot summary ==
After losing his beloved wife, Alba, in a riding accident during her early pregnancy, Diego, Duke of Castamar, has become reclusive, refusing to end his mourning period two years later. The King of Spain, along with Diego's mother, Mercedes, are concerned and want Diego to return to service with the royal council. The King convinces Diego to throw a gala at Castamar to mark the end of his mourning, and Mercedes, along with Marquis Enrique de Arcona, conspire to make a match between Diego and a young woman named Amelia Castro. Mercedes invites Amelia to stay at Castamar, hoping that her son will fall in love with her. She is unaware that Enrique has Amelia under his control, and is hoping to use her as an inside woman to bring down Diego, whom he hates for marrying the woman he loved.

Meanwhile, Clara Belmonte, an orphan who has suffered agoraphobia since her father's death in the war, is advised by Fray Juan, a monk and friend of her father, to take a job in the kitchens at Castamar – she has to use laudanum to make the journey without being overcome by fear. She befriends Rosalía, a ward of Diego's with a learning disability, and two other maids, Elisa and Carmen. Shortly after Clara's arrival, the housekeeper catches the head cook having an illicit affair and fires her; Clara, who has loved cooking all her life and is extremely talented, takes over. The meal is impressive, and Clara is promoted to head cook. Upstairs at the party, Lady Sol Montijos continues her affair with the young Francisco Marlango under the nose of her elderly husband; Diego's friend Alfredo also continues an affair with Ignacio, a friend of Enrique, against his own better judgment. Enrique sleeps with Amelia, causing her to fall pregnant; Amelia confides in Sol, and Enriques uses the affair as further leverage to force Amelia on Diego.

When the king goes missing on his way to the party, Clara finds him in the wine cellar, in a psychotic episode; maddened by guilt, he believes he should not be king and hands Clara a letter of abdication as she nurses him. She and Diego attempt to keep all this hidden, but the queen instructs Diego's butler, Melquíades Elquiza, who is a spy of hers, to find the letter. Diego discovers Elquiza's prying and chooses instead to go to the queen himself; she agrees to keep the secret.

Having accepted the role of Secretary of the council, Diego begins to fall in love, not with Amelia, but with Clara. Meanwhile, Amelia is plagued by an impatient Enrique, who is being blackmailed by Lady Sol – the only other person who knows that he impregnated Amelia – to kill her husband in exchange for her silence on the matter. Amelia finds solace in Diego's brother, Gabriel, whom she initially snubbed due to his black ancestry. He rescues her from a suicide attempt, but she continues to hide the truth from him, turning instead to Sol, who helps her drug Diego and stage a sexual encounter. Believing he has compromised her honour, Diego agrees to marry her. Meanwhile, Clara is left reeling at the discovery that her father is still alive, in hiding due to a false claim of murder against him.

Tragedy strikes when Rosalía dies during a visit from a popular castrato singer. Clara, who had promised to care for her, is wracked with guilt, bringing her closer to Diego. Sol becomes increasingly desperate to escape her husband, who is close to discovering her affair with Francisco. With Amelia's future apparently secure, Enrique arranges the murder, but frames Francisco in the process; to keep her involvement quiet, Sol is forced to kill Francisco herself. Enrique also attempts to drive Clara out by revealing that her father is to be hanged for murder. Distraught, Clara gets lost out in a storm and is very ill for several days; Diego rescues and nurses her, and confesses his love for her; he is ready to give up his title to marry her, but when the king and queen find out, Amelia's pregnancy is revealed to him to ensure that he remains loyal to her, as he believes he is the father.

Gabriel, suspecting that Enrique and Sol have blackmail material on Amelia, begins to investigate; however, Enrique, seeing him as a threat, arranges for him to be kidnapped and sold into slavery. While Clara and Diego search for evidence that can acquit her father and save him from execution, kitchen worker Beatriz discovers that her lover, Leftie – a former employee at Castamar, who trained Alba's horse to kill her on Sol's command – has been involved in the kidnap of Gabriel. She reveals this information to Alfredo shortly before being killed. Sol reveals her work in the death of Alba to Enrique, who loved Alba and always believed that her death was a mishap in his own, similar plan to kill Diego; she then attempts to leave the country, but is later found dead. Diego succeeds in getting information from Leftie and is able to rescue Gabriel. As Diego searches for Enrique, the latter reveals Alfredo and Ignacio's affair publicly, and only Ignacio escapes the law.

Upon finding Enrique, Diego challenges him to a duel; Clara discovers this and overcomes her agoraphobia to go after him. He is badly injured, so she takes his dagger and kills Enrique. As Diego recovers, Gabriel asks Amelia to run away with him, but she refuses and the wedding is set to go ahead. The execution of Clara's father is also going ahead; Clara prepares to go, and, on Amelia's suggestion, decides not to return to Castamar afterwards. Diego confesses to the king that he killed Enrique, and why; instead of arresting him, the king thanks him and asks him to educate his son, Prince Luis. When Diego accepts, the king offers him a favour, and Diego asks him to pardon Clara's father, who is saved just in time. Mercedes later reveals to Gabriel the truth about his heritage and connection to Castamar; his birth mother was the daughter of the first Duke of Castamar and a slave. Just before the wedding, the Castamar family discover the truth about Amelia's child, and the wedding is cancelled. Six months later, Gabriel goes to visit a destitute Amelia, who has given birth, and promises to take care of her and her child. Clara, who has published her cookbook, is enjoying a comfortable life with her father – upon seeing a copy of the book, Diego gives up the Duchy of Castamar so he can finally marry her.

== Episodes ==
No.	Title	Original release date
1	"The Essential Ingredient" — "El ingrediente esencial"	21 February 2021
The Duke’s pregnant wife dies in a fall from a horse. Clara is forced to take a position in the Duke’s kitchen at Castamar. She is overcome with fear when forced to go outside, and must take laudanum to endure the journey. The Duke is ordered to end his mourning and return to court and host a gala at Castamar.
2	"The Night of the King" — "La noche del rey"	28 February 2021
3	"Credo Ut Intelligam" — "Credo ut intelligam"	7 March 2021
4	"Fly Away" — "Vuela"	14 March 2021
5	"The Decision" — "La decisión"	21 March 2021
6	"Where No Light Shines" — "Donde no llega la luz"	28 March 2021
7	"So We Are Not Erased" — "Para que no nos borren"	4 April 2021
8	"What Is Not to Be" — "Lo que no será"	11 April 2021
9	"The Truth" — "La verdad"	18 April 2021
10	"What Really Matters" — "Lo que de verdad importa"	25 April 2021
11	"Lub-dub" — "Lub-dub"	2 May 2021
12	"A Place for Everyone" — "El lugar de cada uno"	9 May 2021

== Awards and nominations ==
Year	Award	Category	Nominee(s)	Result	Ref.
2021	23rd Iris Awards	Best Fiction		Nominated	
2021	23rd Iris Awards	Best Production	Ana Rocha	Nominated	
2021	23rd Iris Awards	Best Actress	Michelle Jenner	Nominated	
2021	23rd Iris Awards	Best Actor	Roberto Enríquez	Nominated	
2021	5th Produ Awards	Best Leading Actor in a Series or Miniseries	Roberto Enríquez	Won	
2021	5th Produ Awards	Best Supporting Actress in a Series or Miniseries	María Hervás	Won	
2021	5th Produ Awards	Best New Actress	Anna Cortés	Won	
2022	30th Actors and Actresses Union Awards	Best Television Actress in a Leading Role	Michelle Jenner	Nominated	
2022	30th Actors and Actresses Union Awards	Best Television Actress in a Minor Role	Roser Pujol	Won	
2022	30th Actors and Actresses Union Awards	Best New Actor	Jean Cruz	Nominated	
