= Breaking Up in Rome =

2021 film

- Directed by: Edoardo Leo
- Screenplay by: Edoardo Leo; Marco Bonini; Damiano Bruè; Lisa Riccardi
- Produced by: Fulvio Lucisano; Federica Lucisano
- Starring: Edoardo Leo; Marta Nieto; Claudia Gerini; Stefano Fresi
- Cinematography: Fabio Zamarion
- Edited by: Consuelo Catucci
- Music by: Gianluca Misiti
- Release date: 2021
- Language: Italian

Breaking Up in Rome (Italian: Lasciarsi un giorno a Roma) is a 2021 Italian-Spanish romantic comedy film co-written and directed by Edoardo Leo and starring Edoardo Leo, Marta Nieto and Claudia Gerini.

== Cast ==
- Edoardo Leo as Tommaso Rosso
- Marta Nieto as Zoe
- Claudia Gerini as Elena Veneziani
- Stefano Fresi as Umberto
- Esther Ortega as Esther
- Anna Dalton as Nina
- Enrica Guidi as Valentina
- Marco Bonini as Nello
- Jonis Bascir as Simone
- Gigio Morra as Franco
- Paola Sotgiu as Maria
- Clemente Pernarella as Flavio
- Lucia Guzzardi as Rachele
- Thierno Thiam as Omar
- Georgia Lepore as Bar Owner

== Production ==
The film was produced by Fulvio and Federica Lucisano. Principal photography started in Rome on 7 July 2020. The original title comes from a hit song by Niccolò Fabi.

== Release ==
The film was released on Italian cinemas on 30 November 2021.

== Reception ==
For this film, Leo was awarded the Flaiano Prize for best director.
