= Rodrigo Sorogoyen =

Spanish film director and screenwriter (born 1981)

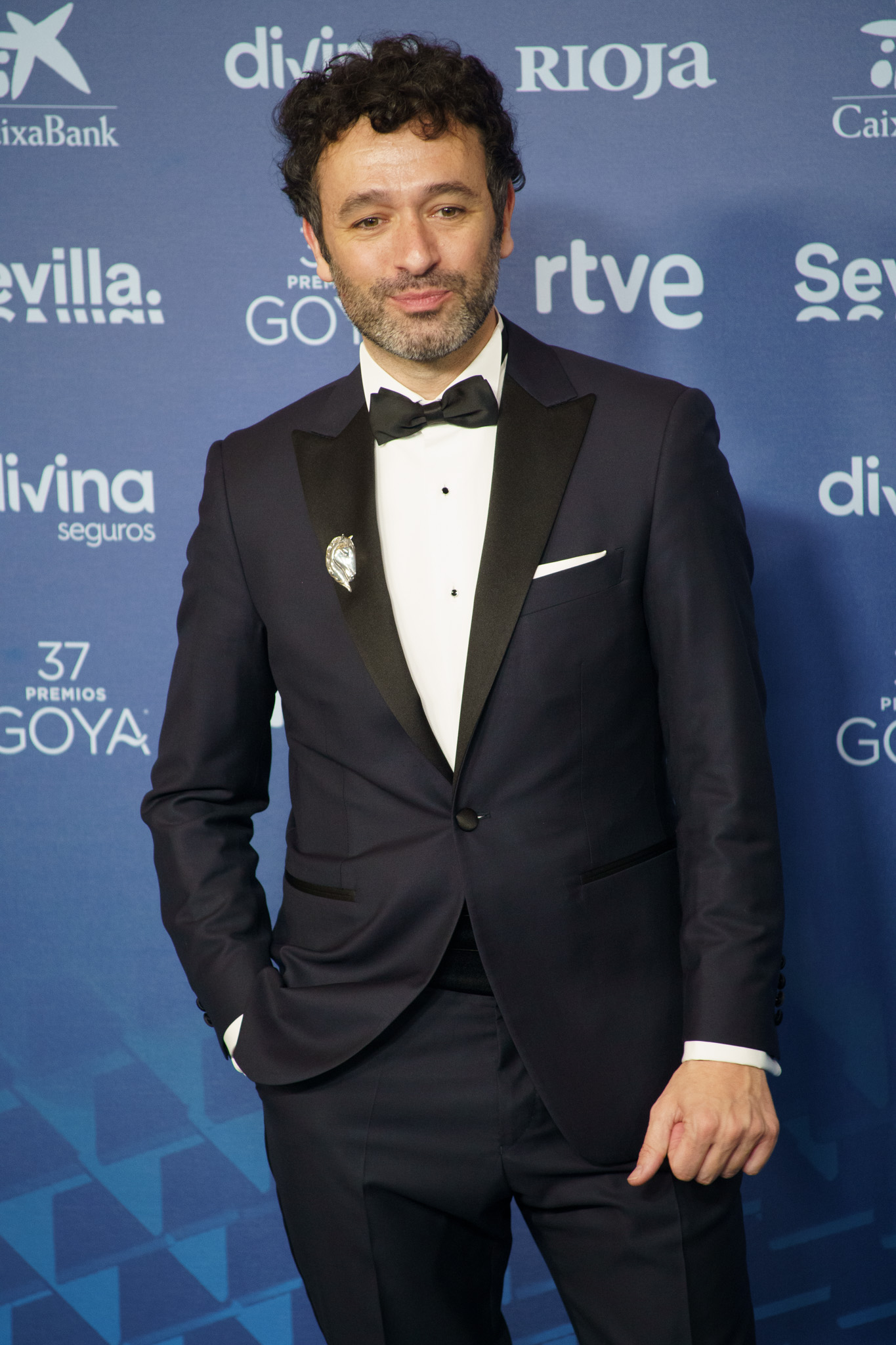
- Sorogoyen in 2023
- Born: Rodrigo Sorogoyen del Amo; 16 September 1981 (age 45); Madrid, Spain
- Occupation: Film director

Rodrigo Sorogoyen del Amo (born 16 September 1981) is a Spanish film director and screenwriter. After co-helming the sketch comedy film 8 Dates with Peris Romano in 2008, Sorogoyen has directed the features Stockholm (2013), May God Save Us (2016), The Realm (2018), Mother (2019), and The Beasts (2022). He has also co-created the miniseries Riot Police (2020) and The New Years (2024). He often works in tandem with screenwriter Isabel Peña.

He has won two Goya Awards for Best Director and two Goya Awards for Best Original Screenplay.

== Biography ==
Born on 16 September 1981 in Madrid, Rodrigo Sorogoyen is the grandson of filmmaker Antonio del Amo. Sorogoyen is known among his closest circles as Ruy. His interest in filmmaking stemmed from the experience of watching Léon: The Professional, which fascinated him. After graduating in history from the Complutense University of Madrid, he entered the ECAM in 2004.

His solo directorial debut Stockholm earned him a nomination for the Goya Award for Best New Director in 2014. For his short film Mother, Sorogoyen won the Goya Award for Best Fictional Short Film in 2018 and was nominated for the Academy Award for Best Live Action Short Film at the 91st Academy Awards. In 2019, Sorogoyen won the Goya Awards for Best Director and Best Original Screenplay for The Realm.

In July 2019, Sorogoyen was invited to become a member of the Academy of Motion Picture Arts and Sciences.

Sorogoyen's The Beasts swept the 37th Goya Awards, with total of 9 awards at the 37th Goya Awards, including Best Film. The Beasts also won him the César Award for Best Foreign Film.

In 2026, Sorogoyen wrote and directed The Beloved, had its world premiere at the 79th Cannes Film Festival.

== Filmography ==
=== Feature Film ===
Year	English Title	Original Title	Director	Writer	Producer	Notes
2008	8 Dates	8 citas	Yes	Yes	No	Co-directed with Peris Romano
2013	Stockholm		Yes	Yes	Executive	Also associate producer
2016	May God Save Us	Que dios nos perdone	Yes	Yes	No	
2018	The Realm	El reino	Yes	Yes	No	
2019	Mother	Madre	Yes	Yes	Yes	Based on his 2017 short film
2022	The Beasts	As bestas	Yes	Yes	Yes	
2026	The Beloved	El ser querido	Yes	Yes	No	

=== Short films ===
Year	Title	Director	Writer	Producer	Notes
2014	El Iluso	Yes	Yes	No	Medium-length film
2017	Madre	Yes	Yes	Executive	
2017	Disquiciones de una pareja que lleva más de seis meses y menos de un año	Yes	Yes	Yes	Also actor

=== Television ===
Year	Title	Director	Writer	Notes	Ref.
2005	Ke no!	No	Yes	Wrote 2 episodes	
2006–2007	Manolo & Benito Corporesion	No	Yes	Wrote 4 episodes	
2008–2010	Impares	Yes	Yes	Directed 43 episodes and wrote 39 episodes	
2010–2011	Impares premium	Yes	Yes	10 episodes	
2010–2011	La pecera de Eva	Yes	No	221 episodes	
2012–2013	Fragiles	Yes	No	Directed 13 episodes	
2015	Rabia	Yes	No	Directed 1 episode	
2020	En casa	Yes	Yes	Episode: "Una Situación Extraordinaria"; Also actor: Carlos	
2020	Antidisturbios	Yes	Yes	6-episode miniseries Also creator and executive producer	
2021	Historias para no dormir	Yes	Yes	Episode: "El doble"	
2022	Apagón	Yes	No	Episode: "Negación"	
2024	The New Years	Yes	Yes	Miniseries, directed 4 episodes Also creator	

== Awards and nominations ==
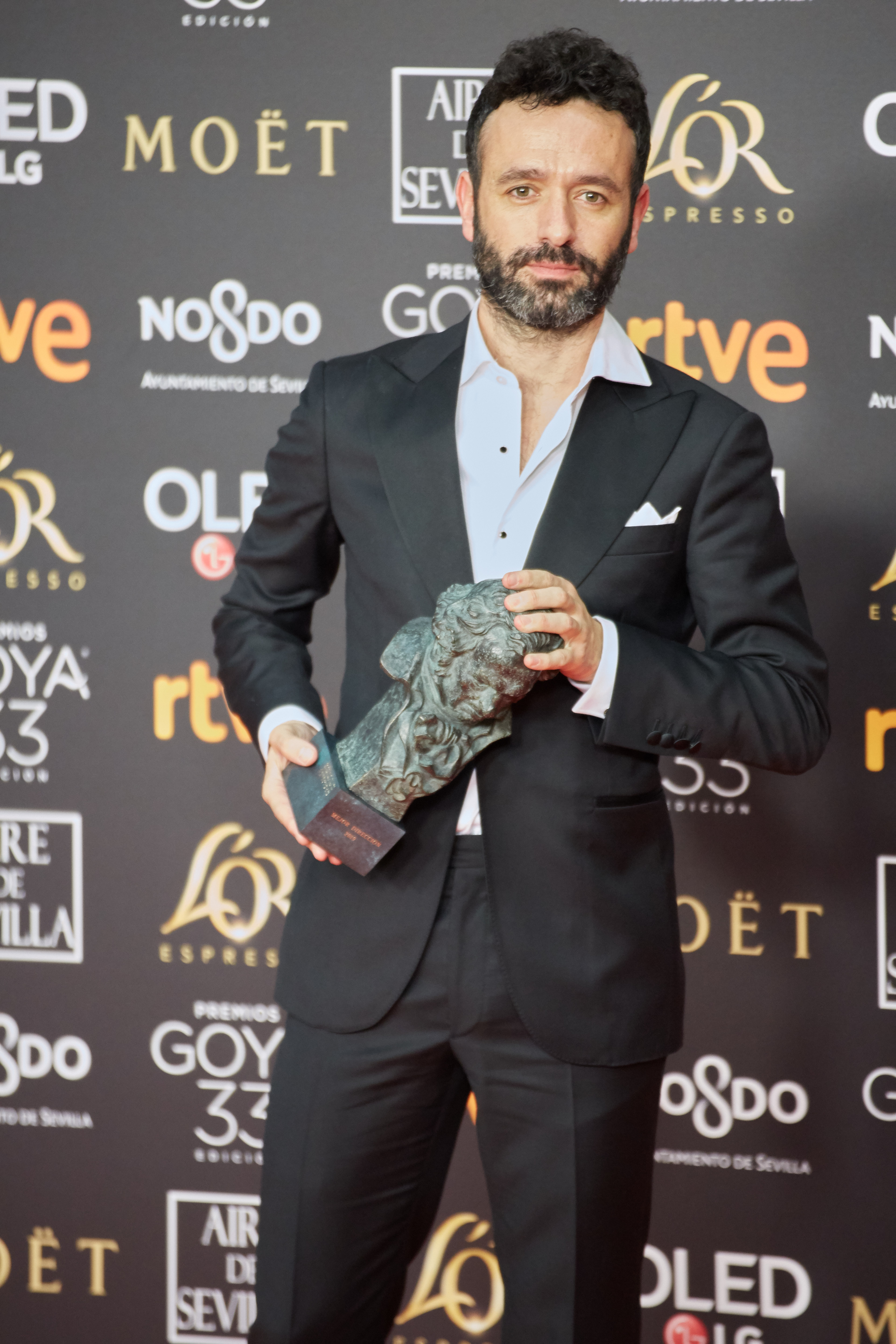
Sorogoyen holding his Goya Award for Best Director for The Realm at the 33rd Goya Awards in 2019

Award	Year	Category	Work	Result	Ref.
Academy Awards	2019	Best Live Action Short Film	Mother	Nominated	
Argentine Film Critics Association	2016	Best Ibero-American Film	Stockholm	Nominated	
Ariel Award	2023	Best Ibero-American Film	The Beasts	Nominated	
CEC Awards	2014	Best New Director	Stockholm	Won	
CEC Awards	2019	Best Film	The Realm	Won	
CEC Awards	2019	Best Director	The Realm	Won	
CEC Awards	2019	Best Original Screenplay	The Realm	Won	
CEC Awards	2023	Best Film	The Beasts	Won	
CEC Awards	2023	Best Director	The Beasts	Won	
CEC Awards	2023	Best Original Screenplay	The Beasts	Won	
César Awards	2023	Best Foreign Film	The Beasts	Won	
David di Donatello	2024	Best International Film	The Beasts	Nominated	
Dublin Film Critics' Circle	2023	Best Screenplay	The Beasts	Runner-up	
Dublin International Film Festival	2023	Dublin Film Critics’ Circle Award for Best Film	The Beasts	Won	
European Parliament	2019	Lux Prize	The Realm	Nominated	
Feroz Awards	2014	Best Drama Film	Stockholm	Won	
Feroz Awards	2014	Best Screenplay	Stockholm	Nominated	
Feroz Awards	2017	Best Drama Film	May God Save Us	Nominated	
Feroz Awards	2017	Best Director	May God Save Us	Nominated	
Feroz Awards	2017	Best Screenplay	May God Save Us	Nominated	
Feroz Awards	2019	Best Drama Film	The Realm	Won	
Feroz Awards	2019	Best Director	The Realm	Won	
Feroz Awards	2019	Best Screenplay	The Realm	Won	
Feroz Awards	2021	Best Drama Series	Riot Police	Won	
Feroz Awards	2023	Best Director	The Beasts	Nominated	
Feroz Awards	2023	Best Screenplay	The Beasts	Nominated	
Forqué Awards	2017	Best Feature Film	May God Save Us	Nominated	
Forqué Awards	2018	Best Short Film	Mother	Won	
Forqué Awards	2019	Best Feature Film	The Realm	Nominated	
Forqué Awards	2022	Best Fiction and Animation Feature Film	The Beasts	Won	
Goya Awards	2014	Best New Director	Stockholm	Nominated	
Goya Awards	2017	Best Director	May God Save Us	Nominated	
Goya Awards	2017	Best Original Screenplay	May God Save Us	Nominated	
Goya Awards	2018	Best Fictional Short Film	Mother	Won	
Goya Awards	2019	Best Director	The Realm	Won	
Goya Awards	2019	Best Original Screenplay	The Realm	Won	
Goya Awards	2020	Best Adapted Screenplay	Mother	Nominated	
Goya Awards	2023	Best Film	The Beasts	Won	
Goya Awards	2023	Best Director	The Beasts	Won	
Goya Awards	2023	Best Original Screenplay	The Beasts	Won	
Grande Prêmio do Cinema Brasileiro	2023	Best Ibero-American Film	The Beasts	Nominated	
Lumière Awards	2023	Best International Co-Production	The Beasts	Won	
Miami Film Festival	2023	Rene Rodriguez Critics Award	The Beasts	Won	
Miami Film Festival	2023	Knight Marimbas Award	The Beasts	Won	
San Sebastián International Film Festival	2016	Jury Prize for Best Screenplay	May God Save Us	Won	
San Sebastián International Film Festival	2022	Audience Award for Best European Film	The Beasts	Won	
Sant Jordi Awards	2017	Best Spanish Film	May God Save Us	Nominated	
Sant Jordi Awards	2019	Best Spanish Film	The Realm	Nominated	
Sant Jordi Awards	2023	Best Spanish Film	The Beasts	Won	
Tokyo International Film Festival	2022	Tokyo Grand Prix	The Beasts	Won	
Tokyo International Film Festival	2022	Best Director	The Beasts	Won	
Transilvania International Film Festival	2014	Transilvania Trophy	Stockholm	Won	
UK Film Festival	2019	Best Feature Film	The Realm	Nominated	
Venice Film Festival	2019	Orizzonti	Mother	Nominated	
