= The Wailing (2024 film) =

- Theatrical release poster
- Spanish: El llanto
- Directed by: Pedro Martín-Calero
- Written by: Isabel Peña; Pedro Martín-Calero
- Produced by: Eduardo Villanueva; Nacho Lavilla; Fernanda del Nido; Cristina Zumárraga; Pablo E. Bossi; Juan Pablo Miller; Jerôme Vidal
- Starring: Ester Expósito; Mathilde Ollivier; Malena Villa
- Cinematography: Constanza Sandoval
- Edited by: Victoria Lammers
- Music by: Olivier Arson
- Production companies: Caballo Films; Setembro Cine; Tandem Films; Tarea Fina; Noodles Productions; El llanto AIE
- Distributed by: Universal Pictures (Spain); Digicine (Argentina); Paname Distribution (France)
- Release dates: 25 September 2024 (Zinemaldia); 25 October 2024 (Spain); 28 November 2024 (Argentina); 21 May 2025 (France)
- Countries: Spain; Argentina; France
- Language: Spanish

The Wailing (Spanish: El llanto) is a 2024 psychological horror film directed by Pedro Martín-Calero and written by Martín-Calero and Isabel Peña. It stars Ester Expósito, Mathilde Ollivier, and Malena Villa. It is a Spanish-Argentine-French co-production.

The film had its world premiere at the 72nd San Sebastián International Film Festival on 25 September 2024 ahead of its theatrical release in Spain on 25 October 2024 by Universal Pictures, in Argentina on 28 November 2024 by Digicine, and in France on 21 May 2025 by Paname Distribution. It earned Martín-Calero the Silver Shell for Best Director and a nomination for the Goya Award for Best New Director.

== Plot ==
The plot follows Andrea, haunted by an invisible presence. 20 years before, the same happened to Marie.

== Cast ==
- Ester Expósito as Andrea
- Mathilde Ollivier as Marie
- Malena Villa as Camila
- Àlex Monner as Pau
- Sonia Almarcha as Mercedes
- Tomás del Estal as Gonzalo
- Lautaro Bettoni as Adolfo

== Production ==
The screenplay was written by Pedro Martín-Calero and Isabel Peña. They sought to connect their film with the literature of Mariana Enríquez. The film, Martín-Calero's debut feature, is a Spanish-Argentine-French co-production by Caballo Films, Setembro Cine, Tandem Films, Tarea Fina, Noodles Productions and El llanto AIE, with participation of RTVE and Amazon Prime Video and funding from ICAA, the Madrid regional administration, and Ayuntamiento de Madrid. Filming began in mid February 2023.

== Release ==
The Wailing had its world premiere in the official competition of the 72nd San Sebastián International Film Festival on 25 September 2024. It also made to the slate of the 57th Sitges Film Festival, the 68th BFI London Film Festival, the 69th Valladolid International Film Festival, and the 37th Tokyo International Film Festival. It was released theatrically in Spain on 25 October 2024 by Universal Pictures International Spain. Distributed by Digicine, it was released theatrically in Argentina on 28 November 2024. Distributed by Paname, it opened in French theatres on 21 May 2025 under the title Les Maudites. Film Movement acquired U.S. distribution rights to the film.

== Reception ==
On the review aggregator website Rotten Tomatoes, 75% of 24 critics' reviews are positive, with an average rating of 6.9/10.

Jonathan Romney of ScreenDaily wrote that "a strong feminist angle gives the film a powerful currency" "and the three young leads are compelling in different ways".

Raquel Hernández Luján of HobbyConsolas gave the film 60 points ('acceptable'), praising "the performances, the atmosphere and the directing job" but pointing out as its main flaw the screenplay "that is not clear about where it is going... or at least how to guide the viewers to the final conclusion".

Andrea G. Bermejo of Cinemanía rated the film 4 out of 5 stars, considering that the viewer will have a great time with this "elevated horror" reminiscent of It Follows "featuring an underlying thesis about violence against women".

Fausto Fernández of Fotogramas rated the film 3 out of 5 stars, praising the three lead actresses' performances as the film's best while mentioning how the film has a hard time getting started and engaging the viewer as its worst.

Desirée de Fez of El Periódico de Catalunya rated the film 4 out of 5 stars, deeming it to be unusual both in its ambition and on a structural and visual level.

Paula Vázquez Prieto of La Nación gave the film a 'good' rating, while noticing that Calero "is less interested in providing answers than in sowing unease".

Alex Saveliev of Film Threat gave the film a 7 out of 10 rating, considering it "a strong piece anchored by terrific acting".

== Accolades ==
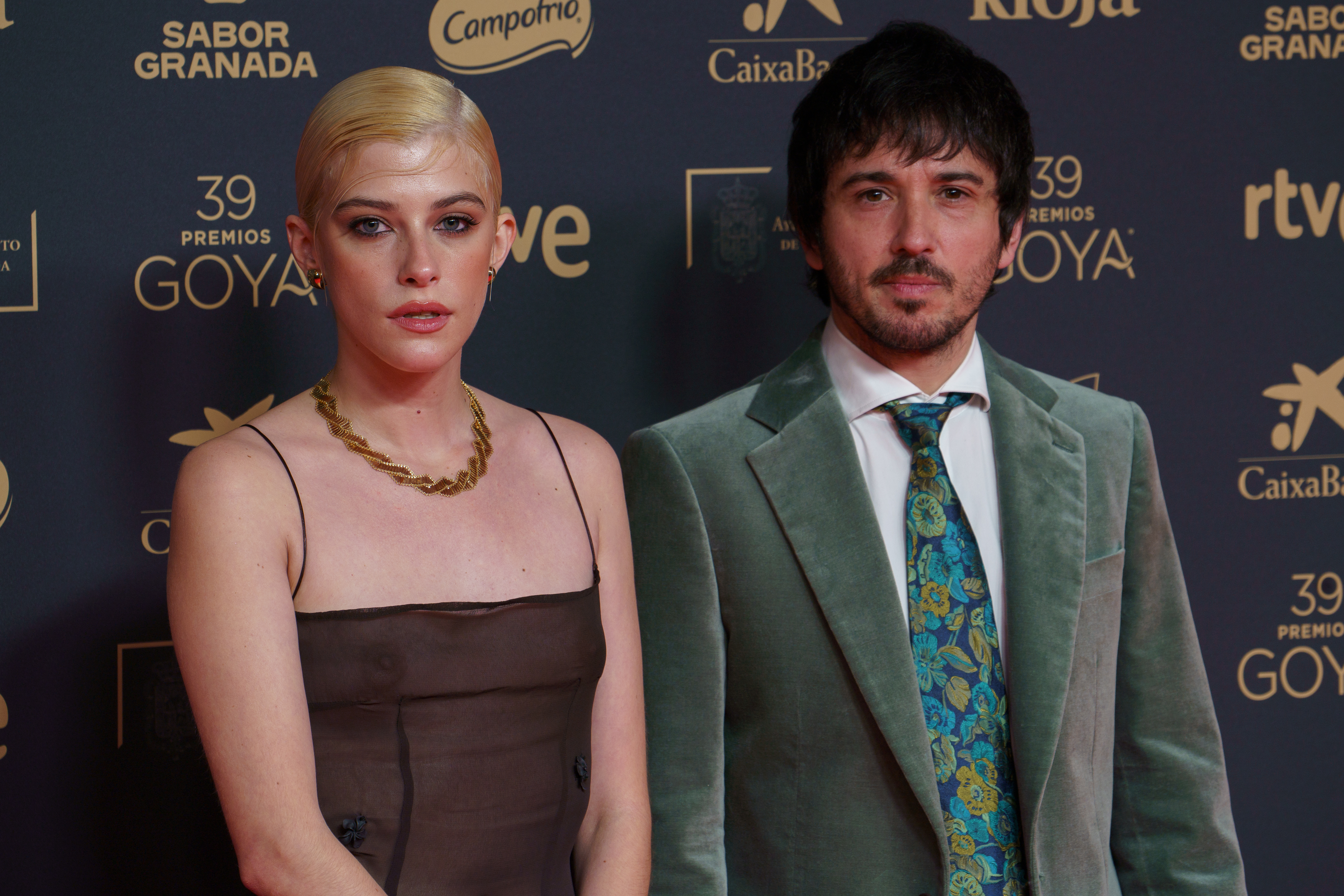
Malena Villa and Pedro Martín-Calero attending the 39th Goya Awards.

Year	Award	Category	Nominee(s)	Result	Ref.
2024	72nd San Sebastián International Film Festival	Golden Shell		Nominated	
2024	72nd San Sebastián International Film Festival	Silver Shell for Best Director	Pedro Martín-Calero	Won	
2025	39th Goya Awards	Best New Director	Pedro Martín-Calero	Nominated	

== See also ==
- List of Spanish films of 2024
- List of Argentine films of 2024
- List of French films of 2025
