= Marta Nieto =

Spanish actress (born 1982)

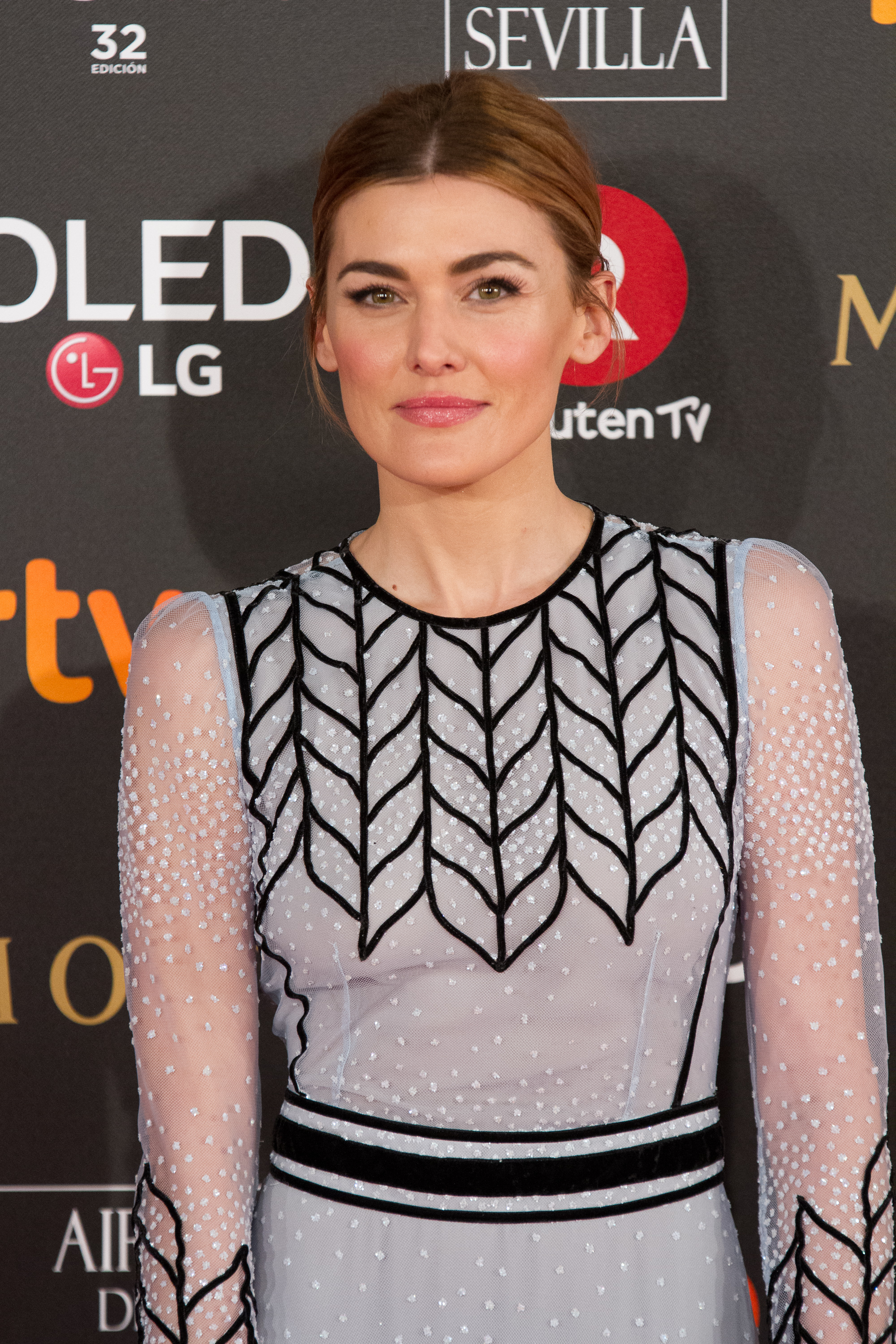
- Nieto at the 32nd Goya Awards in 2018
- Born: Marta Nieto Martínez; 31 January 1982 (age 44); Murcia, Spain
- Education: ESAD-Murcia
- Occupation: Actress
- Years active: 2004–present

Marta Nieto Martínez (born 31 January 1982) is a Spanish actress and film director.

== Life and career ==
Marta Nieto Martínez was born on 31 January 1982 in Murcia to parents from Cartagena. She developed a vocation for acting at the Maristas School in her native Murcia. She trained her acting chops at Murcia's Escuela Superior de Arte Dramático (ESAD-Murcia). She also studied a degree on Spanish philology but did not finish it.

Her directorial debut feature Becoming Ana (2024) was selected to compete at the 69th Valladolid International Film Festival.

== Filmography ==
=== Film ===
Year	Title	Original title	Role	Notes	Ref.
2004	Face of Terror	Face of Terror	Lola		
2004	Art Heist	Art Heist	Héctor's Girl		
2006	Summer Rain	El camino de los ingleses	La Cuerpo		
2007	Love Expresso	Café solo o con ellas	María		
2008	8 Dates	8 citas	María		
2012	The Crypt	La cripta	Leonor		
2013	Combustion	Combustión	Carla		
2014	The Farewell	La despedida	Monica		
2017	Mother	Madre	Marta	Short film	
2019	Litus	Litus	Su		
2019	Mother	Madre	Elena	Nominated - Goya Award for Best Actress	
2020	A Perfect Enemy	A Perfect Enemy	Isabelle		
2020	The Crypt, The Last Secret	La cripta, el último secreto	Leonor		
2021	Breaking Up in Rome	Lasciarsi Un Giorno A Roma	Zoe		
2021	Out of Sync	Tres	C.		
2022		La manzana de oro	La Nívea		
2022		Edén	Lidia		
2023		Visions	Anna		
2023	Jump!	¡Salta!	Elena		
2023	Summer in Red	Verano en rojo	María Ruiz		
TBD		Tropiques			
2024	Becoming Ana	La mitad de Ana		Also director-writer	

=== Television ===
Year	Title	Original title	Role	Notes
2005	Central Hospital	Hospital Central	Fátima	Episode: "Mundos paralelos"
2005	Personal Reasons	Motivos personales	Rita	2 episodes
2006	Table For Five	Mesa para cinco	Nina	4 episodes
2006–2015	Remember When	Cuéntame cómo pasó	Estefanía / Mónica	16 episodes
2007	Quart	Quart		Episode: "Tritonus"
2007–2009	Brothers and Detectives	Hermanos y detectives	Carmen	26 episodes
2008	Generation DF	Generación DF	Mar	5 episodes
2009	Paco's Men	Los hombres de Paco	Marga	4 episodes
2010	Karabudjan	Karabudjan	Ana	6 episodes
2013	The Gift of Alba	El don de Alba		Episode: "La novia blanca"
2013	Fragile	Frágiles	Marta	Episode: "El mendigo herido"
2014	Blind Date	Ciega a citas	Natalia Valdecantos	137 episodes
2015	Ours	Los nuestros	Marta	1 episode
2015	Plastic Sea	Mar de plástico	Jueza	4 episodes
2016	El Caso	El Caso. Crónica de sucesos	Elvira	Episode: "Garrote vil"
2016	The Ministry of Time	El ministerio del tiempo	Isabella of Portugal	Episode: "Cambio de tiempo"
2016	The Man of Your Life	El hombre de tu vida	Luz	Episode: "Desafíos"
2018	Spanish Shame	Vergüenza	Andrea	6 episodes
2019	Locked Up	Vis a vis	Adoptive mother	Episode: "Traición"
2019	Pescaíto	Pescaíto		8 episodes
2019	Secrets of State	Secretos de Estado	Elena Llanos	8 episodes
2020	Caronte	Caronte	Cleo Torres-Soler	Episode: "Inmarcesible"
2020	At Home	En casa	Sara	Episode: "Una situación extraordinaria"
2022	Feria: The Darkest Light	Feria: La luz más oscura	Elena	8 episodes

== Awards and nominations ==
Year	Award	Nominated work	Category	Result	Ref.
2020	25th Forqué Awards	Best Actress	Mother	Won	
2020	7th Feroz Awards	Best Main Actress in a Film	Mother	Nominated	
2020	75th CEC Medals	Best Actress	Mother	Won	
2020	34th Goya Awards	Best Actress	Mother	Nominated	
2020	29th Actors and Actresses Union Awards	Best Film Actress in a Leading Role	Mother	Nominated	
2020	33rd European Film Awards	Best Actress	Mother	Nominated	
2021	27th Forqué Awards	Best Film Actress	Out of Sync	Nominated	
2022	9th Feroz Awards	Best Main Actress in a Film	Out of Sync	Nominated	
