= The Realm (film) =

2018 film

- Film poster
- Spanish: El reino
- Directed by: Rodrigo Sorogoyen
- Written by: Rodrigo Sorogoyen; Isabel Peña
- Produced by: Gerardo Herrero; Mikel Lejarza; Mercedes Gamero
- Starring: Antonio de la Torre; José María Pou; Mónica López; Nacho Fresneda; Ana Wagener; Bárbara Lennie; Luis Zahera
- Cinematography: Alex de Pablo
- Edited by: Alberto del Campo
- Music by: Olivier Arson
- Production companies: Tornasol Films; Trianera PC AIE; Atresmedia Cine; Bowfinger International Pictures; Le Pacte; Mondex & Cie
- Distributed by: Warner Bros. Pictures España
- Release dates: 7 September 2018 (TIFF); 28 September 2018 (Spain)
- Running time: 130 minutes
- Countries: Spain; France
- Language: Spanish

The Realm (Spanish: El reino), also known as The Candidate, is a 2018 Spanish-French thriller film directed by Rodrigo Sorogoyen. At the 33rd Goya Awards, the film won seven awards, including Best Director, Best Actor (Antonio de la Torre), and Best Original Screenplay.

== Plot ==
Without higher education, Manuel has worked his way up in local politics to the point where he may be the next head of the regional council. As Spain has been developing rapidly, attracting foreign investors and substantial funds from the European Union, local politicians have been systematically enriching themselves, some buying ostentatious yachts while others hide their cash in Andorra. The party bosses in Madrid decide that the corruption in the region must be rooted out before the party is discredited nationally.

After refusing to disappear abroad quietly, Manuel is made one of the fall guys, arrested and charged. On bail awaiting trial, he starts a personal campaign to expose the big names who are still free and promises Amaia, a leading TV journalist, that he will get her evidence on the real criminals. Learning that one of the kingpins is not at his villa in Andorra, he goes there at night and persuades the man's daughter to let him in, saying he has to collect vital documents for her father. Finding four handwritten notebooks that mention everybody in the racket, himself included, he races back towards Madrid in the dark.

Shadowed by a vehicle without lights that follows his taillights, he also switches off his lights off and then crashes, ending upside down in a field. When the shadower comes to look for him, he knocks him out and, taking the man's keys, drives his assailant's car on to Madrid. Amaia puts him straight on to her live show, with his notebooks, but has no intention of accusing anybody without adequate proof or of prejudicing future trials. Instead of exploring his allegations, she attacks him for being a self-seeking cog in a vicious machine who is now trying to save his skin by informing on others. His crusade for the truth collapsing, for once he is left speechless.

== Cast ==
- Antonio de la Torre as Manuel López Vidal
- Mónica López as Inés
- Josep Maria Pou as Frías
- Nacho Fresneda as Paco
- Bárbara Lennie as Amaia Marín
- Ana Wagener as La Ceballos
- Luis Zahera as Cabrera
- María de Nati as Nati
- David Lorente as Gallardo
- Paco Revilla as Fernando
- Andrés Lima as Bermejo
- Óscar de la Fuente as Pareja
- Sonia Almarcha as Susana
- Francisco Reyes as Alvarado

== Production ==
The film was produced by Tornasol, Trianera PC AIE, Atresmedia Cine and Bowfinger alongside Le Pacte and Mondex & Cie with the participation of Atresmedia and Movistar+.

Shooting primarily took place in Valencia.

== Release ==
It was screened in the Contemporary World Cinema section at the 2018 Toronto International Film Festival.

Distributed by Warner Bros, it was theatrically released in Spain on 28 September 2018.

== Reception ==
=== Critical response ===
On review aggregator Rotten Tomatoes, the film holds an approval rating of 92% based on 24 reviews, with an average rating of 7.4/10. The website's critical consensus states: "A gripping political thriller led by Antonio de la Torre's solid central performance, The Candidate demands – and rewards – the audience's rapt attention".

=== Awards and nominations ===
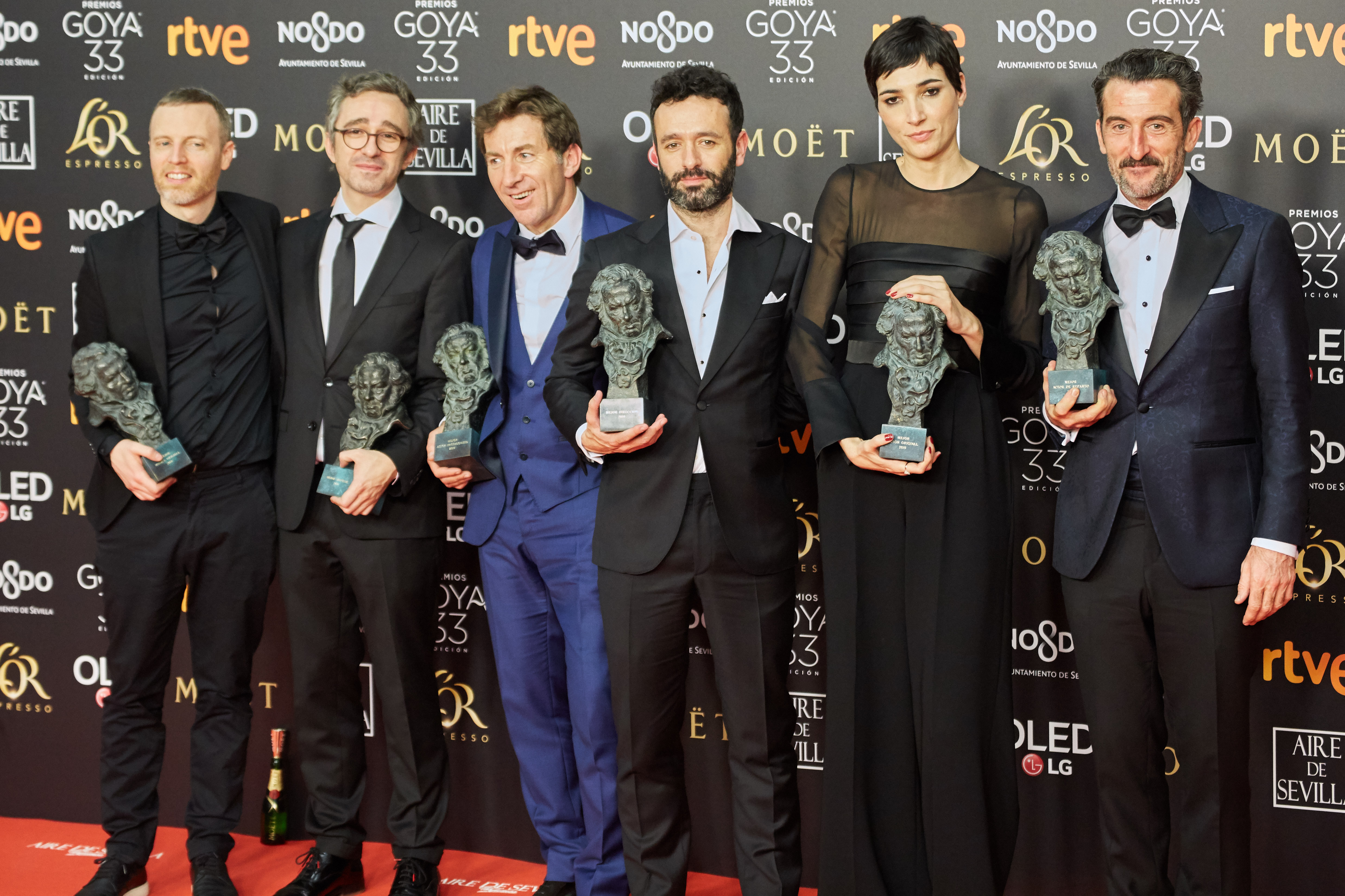
Arson, del Campo, de la Torre, Sorogoyen, Peña, and Zahera holding their Goya Awards for The Realm

Year	Award	Category	Nominee(s)	Result	Ref.
2019	24th Forqué Awards	Best Film		Nominated	
2019	24th Forqué Awards	Best Actor	Antonio de la Torre	Won	
2019	6th Feroz Awards	Best Drama Film		Won	
2019	6th Feroz Awards	Best Actor in a Film	Antonio de la Torre	Won	
2019	6th Feroz Awards	Best Supporting Actress in a Film	Ana Wagener	Nominated	
2019	6th Feroz Awards	Best Supporting Actor in a Film	Luis Zahera	Won	
2019	6th Feroz Awards	Best Supporting Actor in a Film	José María Pou	Nominated	
2019	6th Feroz Awards	Best Film Trailer		Nominated	
2019	6th Feroz Awards	Best Film Poster		Nominated	
2019	6th Feroz Awards	Best Screenplay	Isabel Peña, Rodrigo Sorogoyen	Won	
2019	6th Feroz Awards	Best Original Score	Olivier Arson	Nominated	
2019	6th Feroz Awards	Best Director	Rodrigo Sorogoyen	Won	
2019	33rd Goya Awards	Best Film		Nominated	
2019	33rd Goya Awards	Best Director	Rodrigo Sorogoyen	Won	
2019	33rd Goya Awards	Best Actor	Antonio de la Torre	Won	
2019	33rd Goya Awards	Best Supporting Actress	Ana Wagener	Nominated	
2019	33rd Goya Awards	Best Supporting Actor	Luis Zahera	Won	
2019	33rd Goya Awards	Best New Actor	Francisco Reyes	Nominated	
2019	33rd Goya Awards	Best Original Score	Olivier Arson	Won	
2019	33rd Goya Awards	Best Production Supervision	Iñaki Ros	Nominated	
2019	33rd Goya Awards	Best Cinematography	Alejandro de Pablo	Nominated	
2019	33rd Goya Awards	Best Editing	Alberto del Campo	Won	
2019	33rd Goya Awards	Best Original Screenplay	Isabel Peña, Rodrigo Sorogoyen	Won	
2019	33rd Goya Awards	Best Sound	Roberto Fernández, Alfonso Raposo	Won	
2019	33rd Goya Awards	Best Special Effects	Óscar Abades, Helmuth Barnert	Nominated	
2019	28th Actors and Actresses Union Awards	Best Film Actor in a Leading Role	Antonio de la Torre	Won	
2019	28th Actors and Actresses Union Awards	Best Film Actress in a Secondary Role	Ana Wagener	Won	
2019	28th Actors and Actresses Union Awards	Best Film Actor in a Secondary Role	Luis Zahera	Nominated	
2019	28th Actors and Actresses Union Awards	Best Film Actress in a Minor Role	Sonia Almarcha	Nominated	
2019	6th Platino Awards	Best Actor	Antonio de la Torre	Won	
2019	6th Platino Awards	Best Film Editing	Alberto del Campo	Won	
2019	6th Platino Awards	Best Original Score	Olivier Arson	Nominated	
2019	6th Platino Awards	Best Sound	Roberto Fernández, Alfonso Raposo	Nominated	
2019	9th UK Film Festival	Best Feature Film	Rodrigo Sorogoyen	Nominated	

== See also ==
- List of Spanish films of 2018
