= Mónica López (actress) =

Spanish actress

- Born: 30 May 1969 (age 57); Las Palmas, Spain
- Occupation: Actress
- Years active: 1991–present

Mónica López (born 30 May 1969) is a Spanish actress. She has appeared in more than forty movies since 1991.

== Selected filmography ==
Film

Year	Title	Role	Notes
2001	Intacto	Sara	
2003	In the City	Irene	
2005	The Uninvited Guest		
2008	Awaking from a Dream	Alina	
2016	May God Save Us		
2018	The Realm	Inés	
2026	Apocalypse Z: New World	Castro	

Television

Year	Title	Role	Notes
2009	23-F: El día más difícil del Rey	Queen Sofía of Spain	
2015	Los nuestros	Esposa del embajador español	
2021	La cocinera de Castamar	Úrsula Berenguer	
2022	Rapa	Maite	
