= 2001: Mientras Kubrick estaba en el espacio =

- Film poster
- Directed by: Gabriel Nicoli
- Written by: Gabriel Nicoli
- Produced by: Gonzalo Agulla; Juan Jaureguialzo; Gabriel Pastore
- Starring: Alan Daicz; Malena Villa; Vicente Correa
- Cinematography: Daniel Ortega
- Edited by: Federico Mackeprang; Gabriel Nicoli
- Music by: Seba Landro
- Production companies: Clásica Productora; Carrousel Films; INCAA
- Release date: December 8, 2016
- Running time: 77 minutes
- Country: Argentina
- Language: Spanish

2001: Mientras Kubrick estaba en el espacio (lit. '2001: While Kubrick was in space') is a 2016 Argentine road comedy-drama film written and directed by Gabriel Nicoli. The film premiered on December 8, 2016, in Argentine theaters.

== Synopsis ==
In 2001, far away from spaceships, Argentina suffers a social and economic crisis that arouses fury in the streets. Looting, violence and terror are part of the everyday landscape. Fear flies over the environment and families are breaking up in a rarefied climate.

== Cast ==
The actors participating in this film are:

- Alan Daicz as Valentin
- Malena Villa as Juliet
- Vicente Correa as Felipe
- María Onetto as Felipe's mother
- Gabo Correa as Felipe's father
- Jazmín Stuart as Andrea
- Roxana Randon as Grandmother
- Barbara Lombardo as Sofia
- Esteban Lamothe as Lover
- Iair Said as Video store owner
- Pablo Pinto as Man Town
- Adriana Ferrer as Valentin's mother

== Production ==
The movie was filmed in Azul for 5 days. The Principal photography took 4 weeks 5 days to complete.
