= Mercado Central (TV series) =

Spanish soap opera

- Genre: Soap opera; Drama
- Based on: an original idea by David Plana
- Written by: Eva Baeza; David Plana; Verónica Viñé; Eulàlia Carrillo
- Directed by: Joan Noguera
- Starring: Antonio Garrido; Lola Marceli; Jesús Olmedo; César Sánchez; Marta Poveda; Miriam Montilla; Bárbara Mestanza; Dani Luque; Malena Gutiérrez; Ana Rayo; Paco Ochoa; Francesc Cuéllar; Abel Rodríguez; Begoña Maestre; Cloe Seró; Santiago Molero; Ettore Colombo; Ana Ruiz; Jean Cruz; Eva Isanta; Jordi Rebellón; Sebastián Iturra; Raúl Mérida
- Opening theme: "Una luz en la ciudad" by Jesús Díaz, performed by Rozalén & Carlos Sadness
- Country of origin: Spain
- Original language: Spanish
- No. of seasons: 2
- No. of episodes: 310

Production
- Production location: Boadilla del Monte
- Production companies: RTVE; Diagonal TV

Original release
- Network: La 1
- Release: 23 September 2019 – 22 January 2021

Mercado Central (transl. 'Central Market') is a Spanish soap opera television series based on an original idea by David Plana that originally aired on La 1 from 23 September 2019 to 21 January 2021. The series' ensemble cast features the likes of Antonio Garrido, Begoña Maestre, Lola Marceli and Jesús Olmedo, among others.

== Premise ==
The plot revolves around the working and personal relationships and mishaps established among the people whose earnings depend on the stalls of a market located in current-day Madrid. The latter faces the prospect of municipal closure.

== Cast ==
- Antonio Garrido as Elías.
- Begoña Maestre as Celia Mendoza.
- Jesús Olmedo as Jorge Santos.
- Lola Marceli as Adela.
- César Sánchez as Jesús de la Cruz
- Francesc Cuéllar as Germán.
- Miriam Montilla as Rosa.
- Marta Poveda as Lorena.
- Malena Gutiérrez as Valeria Hinojosa.
- Ana Rayo as Carmen.
- Paco Ochoa as Nicolás.
- Dani Luque as Samuel.
- Santiago Molero as Nacho Salinas.
- Cloe Seró as Noa.
- Ettore Colombo as Paolo Giordano
- Ana Ruiz as Cristina.
- Óscar Ortuño as Andrea.
- Bárbara Mestanza as Carla Rivas.
- Jean Cruz as Jonathan.
- Francesco Nappi as Doménico.
- Raúl Sanz as Ginés Hortuño.
- Eva Isanta as Gloria Suárez.
- Jordi Rebellón as Fernando Luján.
- Raúl Mérida as Martín Suárez.
- María Casal as Sofía Olmos.
- Sebastián Iturria as Lucas Ortega.
- Guadalupe Lancho as Ágata
- David Lorente as Alberto
- Iris de Campos as Marta.

== Production and release ==
Based on an original idea by David Plana, the screenplay was developed by Eva Baeza, David Plana, Verónica Viñé and Eulàlia Carrillo. Produced by RTVE in collaboration with Diagonal TV, shooting started in July 2019, primarily taking place in a film set in Boadilla del Monte. The series was directed by Joan Noguera. The opening theme ("Una luz en la ciudad") was composed by Jesús Díaz and performed by Rozalén and Carlos Sadness. Production of the series was disrupted by the COVID-19 pandemic. The series premiered on La 1 on 23 September 2019, placed in the sobremesa time slot. After 310 episodes, the broadcasting run ended on 22 January 2021.
