= May God Save Us =

- Theatrical release poster
- Spanish: Que dios nos perdone
- Directed by: Rodrigo Sorogoyen
- Written by: Rodrigo Sorogoyen; Isabel Peña
- Produced by: Gerardo Herrero; Mikel Lejarza; Mercedes Gamero
- Starring: Antonio de la Torre; Roberto Álamo; Luis Zahera; Raúl Prieto; María Ballesteros; Mónica López; Rocío Muñoz; José Luis García Pérez; María de Nati; Teresa Lozano
- Cinematography: Alex de Pablo
- Edited by: Alberto del Campo; Fernando Franco
- Music by: Olivier Arson
- Production companies: Tornasol Films; Atresmedia Cine; Mistery Producciones AIE; Hernández y Fernández PC
- Distributed by: Warner Bros. Pictures España
- Release dates: 18 September 2016 (SSIFF); 28 October 2016 (Spain)
- Running time: 125 minutes
- Country: Spain
- Language: Spanish

May God Save Us (Spanish: Que Dios nos perdone, lit. 'May God Forgive Us') is a 2016 Spanish crime thriller film directed by Rodrigo Sorogoyen and written by Sorogoyen and Isabel Peña. It stars Antonio de la Torre and Roberto Álamo as a couple of flawed police investigators tracking down a serial killer of elderly women in Madrid.

== Plot ==
In the hot summer of 2011, against the backdrop of the economic crisis and the 15-M Movement, Madrid is swarmed by a million and a half of pilgrims awaiting the visit of Pope Benedict XVI. Two police inspectors are commissioned to investigate a brutal serial killer who rapes and kills older women. The two inspectors will have to solve the case in a short time and without too much clamor. The ending is unexpected and after three years from the facts told.

== Cast ==
- Antonio de la Torre as Luis Velarde
- Roberto Álamo as Javier Alfaro
- Javier Pereira as Andrés Bosque
- Luis Zahera as Alonso
- José Luis García Pérez as Sancho
- Mónica López as Amparo
- María Ballesteros as Rosario
- Raúl Prieto as Bermejo
- Rocío Muñoz as Juana
- María de Nati as Elena
- Teresa Lozano as Amalia
- Fran Nortes as Rafael March
- Andrés Gertrúdix as Padre Raúl

== Production ==
The screenplay of May God Save Us was penned by Isabel Peña and Rodrigo Sorogoyen. The film was produced by Tornasol Films, Atresmedia Cine, Mistery Producciones AIE and Hernández y Fernández PC, with the participation of Atresmedia, Movistar+ and Telemadrid. Outdoor scenes in Malasaña involved shooting in the Maestro Guerrero and Desengaño streets. In addition to Madrid, footage was also shot in Tenerife, taking advantage of the Canarian archipelago's tax incentives. The film was edited by Alberto del Campo and Fernando Franco.

== Release ==
The film had its world premiere in September 2016 at the 64th San Sebastián International Film Festival, screened in the festival's main competition. Distributed by Warner Bros, the film was theatrically released in Spain on 28 October 2016.

== Reception ==
According to the review aggregation website Rotten Tomatoes, May God Save Us has a 100% approval rating based on 6 reviews from critics, with an average rating of 7.7/10.

Jonathan Holland of The Hollywood Reporter wrote that Sorogoyen "mixes up police procedural, social crit, character study, black humor and Catholicism into a taut and distinctive whole", summing up as a bottom line: "sweaty and suspenseful".

Carlos Marañón of Cinemanía rated the film 4 out of 5 stars, deeming it to be a benchmark noir for Madrid's Augusts, supported by a dedicated and well-understood costumbrismo, and channeling Spain's recent past.

Quim Casas of El Periódico de Catalunya also gave it 4 out of 5 stars, considering the Sorogoyen shoots well the oppression of the moment and the atmosphere, with the film, up until certain point, "confronting and unscrewing the two protagonists, both of whom are plunged into their own hells".

Javier Ocaña of El País wrote that the film features a "a superb work of art direction and mise-en-scène with a vehement and very attractive camera", offering a socially disheartening portrait of Madrid, assessing that the film may only raise doubts in regard of the "excessive psychological explanations". He also wrote about the cast's "fabulous" performances, from Álamo and De la Torre to those actors barely declaiming a few lines.

== Accolades ==
Year	Award	Category	Nominee(s)	Result	Ref.
2017	22nd Forqué Awards	Best Film		Nominated	
2017	22nd Forqué Awards	Best Actor	Roberto Álamo	Won	
2017	4th Feroz Awards	Best Drama Film		Nominated	
2017	4th Feroz Awards	Best Director	Rodrigo Sorogoyen	Nominated	
2017	4th Feroz Awards	Best Screenplay	Isabel Peña, Rodrigo Sorogoyen	Nominated	
2017	4th Feroz Awards	Best Actor (film)	Roberto Álamo	Won	
2017	4th Feroz Awards	Best Supporting Actor (film)	Javier Pereira	Nominated	
2017	4th Feroz Awards	Best Original Score		Nominated	
2017	4th Feroz Awards	Best Trailer		Nominated	
2017	31st Goya Awards	Best Film		Nominated	
2017	31st Goya Awards	Best Director	Rodrigo Sorogoyen	Nominated	
2017	31st Goya Awards	Best Actor	Roberto Álamo	Won	
2017	31st Goya Awards	Best Supporting Actor	Javier Pereira	Nominated	
2017	31st Goya Awards	Best Original Screenplay		Nominated	
2017	31st Goya Awards	Best Editing		Nominated	
2017	26th Actors and Actresses Union Awards	Best Film Actor in a Secondary Role	Javier Pereira	Nominated	
2017	4th Platino Awards	Best Editing		Nominated	

== See also ==
- List of Spanish films of 2016
