= Lucia Guzzardi =

Italian actress (born 1927)

- Born: 1 January 1927 (age 98); Palermo, Italy
- Occupation: Actress
- Years active: 1959–present

Lucia Guzzardi (born 1 January 1927) is an Italian actress who appeared in numerous films and television series, playing the characters of Sicilians women.

== Life and career ==
Guzzardi was born in Palermo in 1927. She started her career playing the roles of Sicilians women in classic Italian films, always in supporting and uncredited roles until the 1980s. After 1990s her career became more known because of the more credited roles she interpreted. After the 2000s her career became more famous appearing in Italian films and TV Shows playing the characters of grandmothers, aunts, neighbors, busybodies etc.

She appeared in roles like Madre Tony in Men Men Men (1995), Gianna in Roseanna's Grave (1997), Madame Giry in The Phantom of the Opera (1998), Landlady in Eat Pray Love (2010), Iolanda in Tell No One (2012), Babushka in Zoolander 2 (2016), Lady in The Honeymoon (2022) etc. Except acting, she also voiced Claudia Cardinale voice in Audace colpo dei soliti ignoti (1959).

== Filmography ==
Filmography
Year	Title	Role
1995	Men Men Men	Madre Tony
1997	Un paradiso di bugie	Carmela
1997	Roseanna's Grave	Gianna
1998	The Phantom of the Opera	Madame Giry
1999	La Fame e la sete	Maria
2002	The Legend of Al, John and Jack	Lavandaia
2003	Uncle Nino	Italian Woman
2009	Maria, ihm schmeckt's nicht!	Nonna Anna
2010	Eat Pray Love	Landlady
2011	The Ages of Love	
2012	Tell No One	Iolanda
2014	Andiamo a quel paese	
2015	Vancanze ai Caraibi	
2016	Zoolander 2	Babushka
2016	Forever Young	
2021	Breaking Up in Rome	Rachele
2022	The Honeymoon	Lady
