= ECAM (film school) =

Film school in the Madrid region, Spain

Escuela de Cinematografía y del Audiovisual de la Comunidad de Madrid
- Type: Not for profit foundation
- Established: 1994; 31 years ago
- President: Enrique Cerezo
- Director: Gonzalo Salazar-Simpson
- Students: 315
- Undergraduates: 90
- Postgraduates: 225
- Location: Pozuelo de Alarcón, Community of Madrid, Spain
- Website: ecam.es

School of Cinematography and Audiovisual of the Community of Madrid (Spanish: Escuela de Cinematografía y del Audiovisual de la Comunidad de Madrid; ECAM), also sometimes referred to as "The Madrid Film School", is a film school located in Ciudad de la Imagen, Pozuelo de Alarcón, Spain. It was founded in 1994, established as a not-for-profit cultural foundation, under the initiative of the regional ministry of Education and Culture, SGAE, AACCEE and EGEDA, to which AISGE joined in 1997. In 2014, DAMA joined the board of trustees.

It is the largest film school in the region since the closure of the Escuela Oficial de Cine in 1976. It was admitted as a member of the International Association of Film and Television Schools in 1999.

It offers undergraduate, postgraduate, and other courses across all cinema and television disciplines.

In 2020 The Hollywood Reporter listed it among 'The Top 15 International Film Schools', featuring it as one of the world's fifteen most important film schools outside the USA. In 2019 and 2020, Madrid Film School teaching staff and alumni among them won twelve Goya Awards, Spanish cinema's highest honor.

== Alumni ==
Some of its alumni have gained fame in a number of audiovisual fields, from screenwriting to art direction.

- Javier Aguirresarobe
- Paco Plaza
- Rodrigo Sorogoyen
- Carlota Pereda
- Fernando González Molina
- Miguel Ángel Vivas
- Pilar Palomero
- Alauda Ruiz de Azúa
- Luis López Carrasco
- Isabel Peña
- Fernando Franco
- Ángela Armero
- Álvaro Morte
- Verónica Fernández
- Isabel de Ocampo
