= Malena Villa =

Argentine actress and singer-songwriter

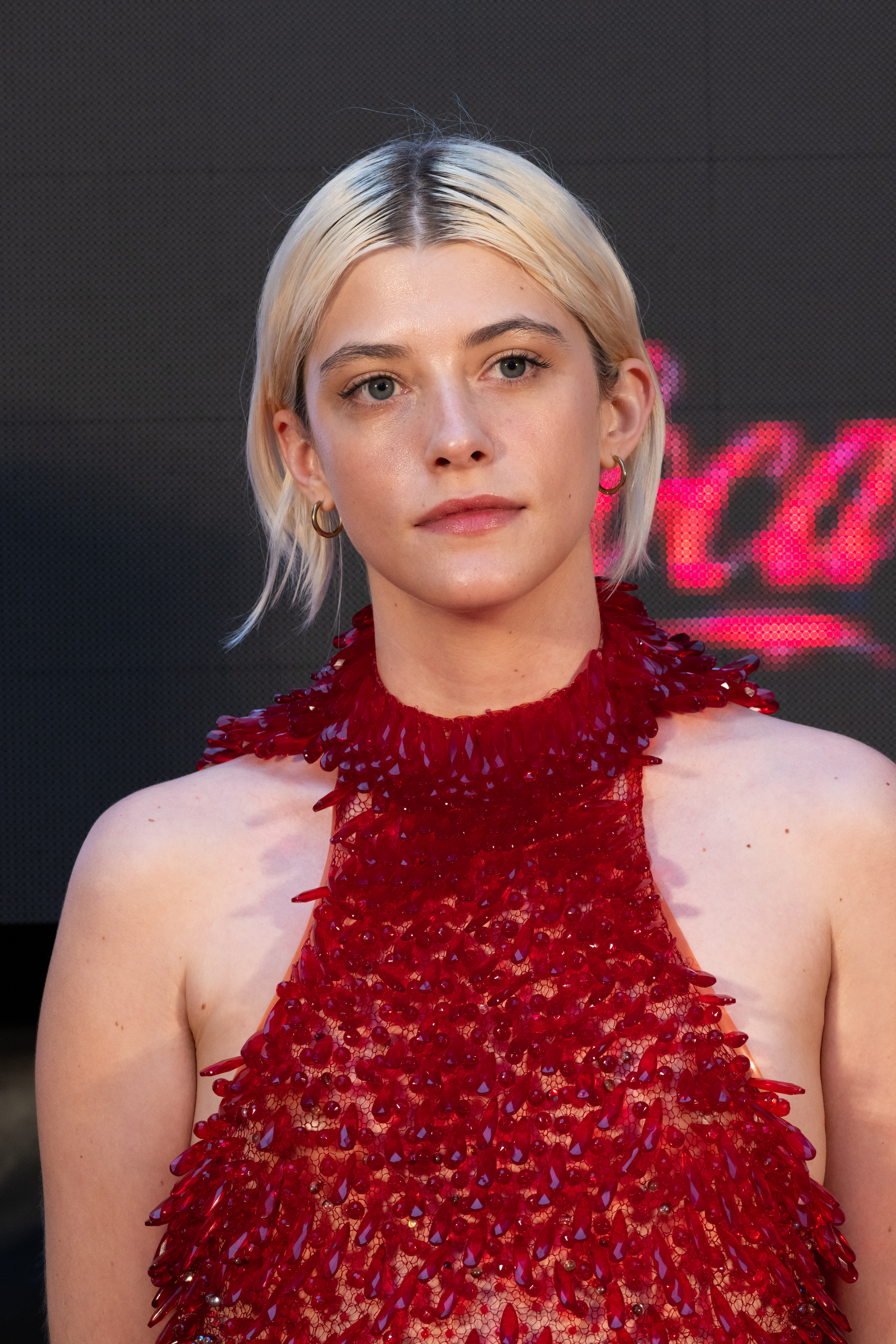
Villa in 2024

Malena Villa is an Argentine actress and singer-songwriter.

== Life and career ==
She is the daughter of actor Néstor Villa. She made her feature film debut as an actress in Julián Giulianelli's Puentes (2009). It was followed by film performances in El amor a veces, Labios azules, Butterfly (for which earned her a nomination for the Silver Condor for Best New Actress), 2001: Mientras Kubrick estaba en el espacio, and El Angel (portraying twin sisters Marisol and Magdalena) and television series The Lobbyist and 100 días para enamorarse.

In June 2020, she released her debut musical album, La negación, which launched her career as a singer-songwriter. In Matadero (2022), Villa portrayed a naïve assistant film director in 1970s Argentina, while in the horror film The Wailing (2024), she portrayed a young film student in the 1990s. She also landed roles in Summer Hit, Death of a Comedian, and The Beloved.
