= 8 Dates =

- Theatrical release poster
- Spanish: 8 citas
- Directed by: Peris Romano; Rodrigo Sorogoyen
- Written by: Peris Romano; Rodrigo Sorogoyen
- Starring: Raúl Arévalo; Verónica Echegui; José Luis Gª Pérez; Adriana Ozores; Belén Rueda; Miguel Ángel Solá; Fernando Tejero; Jordi Vilches; Arturo Valls; Ana Wagener
- Cinematography: Juan Hernández
- Edited by: David Pinillos
- Production companies: Impala; Tesela PC
- Distributed by: Alta Classics
- Release dates: 10 April 2008 (Málaga); 18 April 2008 (Spain)
- Country: Spain
- Language: Spanish

8 Dates (Spanish: 8 citas) is a 2008 Spanish comedy film written and directed by Peris Romano and Rodrigo Sorogoyen which features an ensemble cast of actors.

== Plot ==
The plot, split in 8 parts, concerns about 8 romantic vignettes depicting the evolution of 8 couple relationships.

== Cast ==
- Fernando Tejero as Antonio
- Belén López as Sofía
- José Luis García Pérez as Rafa
- Raúl Arévalo as Jesús
- Cecilia Freire as Nuria
- Javier Rey as Pablo
- Marta Nieto as María
- Jesús Caba as Edu
- Ana Wagener as Maite
- Verónica Echegui as Vane
- Jordi Vilches as Juan
- Marta Hazas as Cris
- Alfonso Bassave as Alfonso
- Melanie Olivares as Natalia
- Jesús Olmedo as Dani
- María Ballesteros as Ana
- Arturo Valls as Sergi
- Miguel Ángel Solá as Fernando
- Adriana Ozores as Rosa
- Javier Pereira as Jose
- Raquel Pérez as Manoli
- Belén Rueda as Elena
- Maxi Iglesias
- Alicia Rubio
- Gabriel Chamé
- Jesús Guzmán
- Tzeitel Rodríguez
- Daniel Muriel
- Jorge Ventosa
- Aroa Gimeno
- Nuria Ansón
- Enrique Asenjo
- Silma López

== Production ==
The screenplay was penned by the helmers Peris Romano and Rodrigo Sorogoyen. The film was produced by Impala and Tesela and it had the participation of TVE and Canal+. Shooting locations included the province of Segovia.

== Release ==
The film was selected for the Málaga Film Festival's official selection, premiering on 10 April 2008. Distributed by Alta Classics, it was theatrically released in Spain on 18 April 2008.

== Reception ==
Jonathan Holland of Variety deemed the film to be "an above-average if over-derivative Spanish laffer" which "has fun written all over it and contains more than its share of astute observational comedy, but too often mistakes laffs for the merely absurd".

Irene Crespo of Cinemanía rated the film 2½ out of 5 stars, comparing it to a mix of Love Actually and Escenas de matrimonio, considering that the hook consisting of the extended cast full of known faces "gets lost along the way and soon [the film] falls into cliché, clumsy and predictable love situations".

== See also ==
- List of Spanish films of 2008
