= Raúl Prieto =

Spanish actor (born 1976)

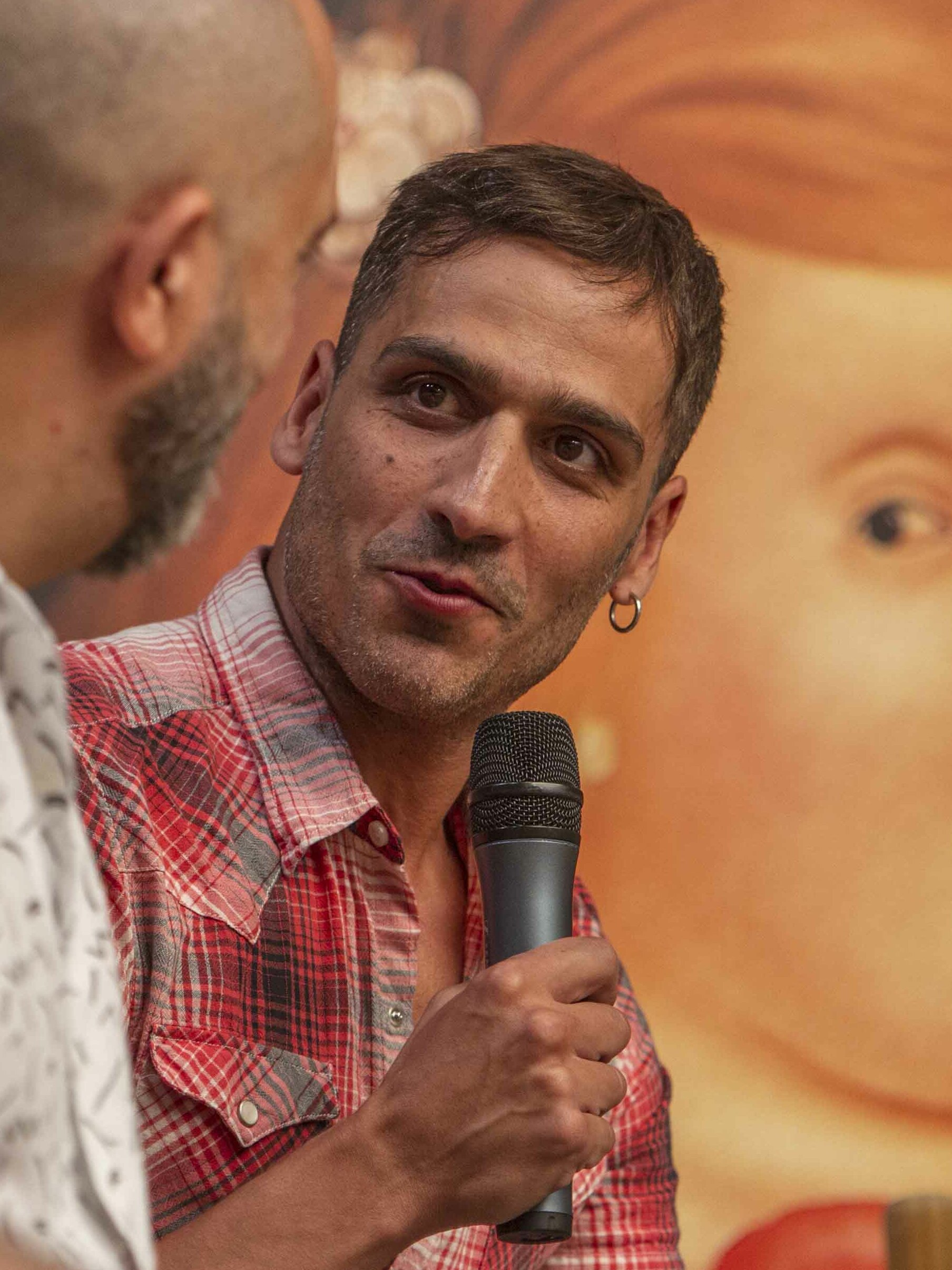
- Prieto in 2018
- Born: 1976 (age 49–50); Valencia, Spain
- Education: Pontifical University of Salamanca; RESAD
- Occupation: Actor

Raúl Prieto (born 1976) is a Spanish stage, television, and film actor.

== Early life and education ==
Raúl Prieto was born in 1976 in Valencia but he was raised in Salamanca. He studied information sciences (journalism) at the Pontifical University of Salamanca. Upon completing his degree he moved to Madrid and joined the RESAD.

== Career ==
Prieto made his feature film debut as an actor in the 2003 low-budget film La fiesta.

His stage work includes performances in the plays La función por hacer, Refugio, Jauría, Nápoles millonaria!, and Tan solo es el fin del mundo.

== Filmography ==
=== Film ===
Year	Title	Role	Notes	Ref.
2003	La fiesta	Javi	Feature film debut	
2016	Que Dios nos perdone (May God Save Us)	Bermejo		
2018	El desentierro (The Uncovering)	Richi		
2019	Madre (Mother)	Ramón		
2019	El silencio del pantano (The Silence of the Marsh)	Nacho		
2025	Molt lluny (Away)	Miguel		
2025	Parecido a un asesinato (Hidden Murder)	Javi		
2026	Morir no siempre sale bien (To Die Is Not Always Good Business)	Tomás		

=== Television ===
Year	Title	Role	Notes	Ref.
2008–10	La señora	Salvador González	Seasons 1–3	
2015	Sin identidad	Álex Barral	Season 2	
2020	Antidisturbios (Riot Police)	Bermejo		
2022	Vanda	Gonzalo		
2023	La chica de nieve (The Snow Girl)	Álvaro Martín		
2023	Las noches de Tefía (Nights in Tefía)	Boncho		
2023	El cuerpo en llamas (Burning Body)	Manu		
2023	4 estrellas	Julio Conde		

== Accolades ==
Year	Award	Category	Work	Result	Ref.
2011	14th Max Awards	Best Supporting Actor	La función por hacer	Won	
2011	20th Actors and Actresses Union Awards	Best Stage Actor in a Minor Role	La función por hacer	Won	
2024	2nd Talía Awards	Best Actor in a Supporting Role in a Text Theater	Tan solo el fin del mundo	Won	
