= Jean Cruz =

Actor

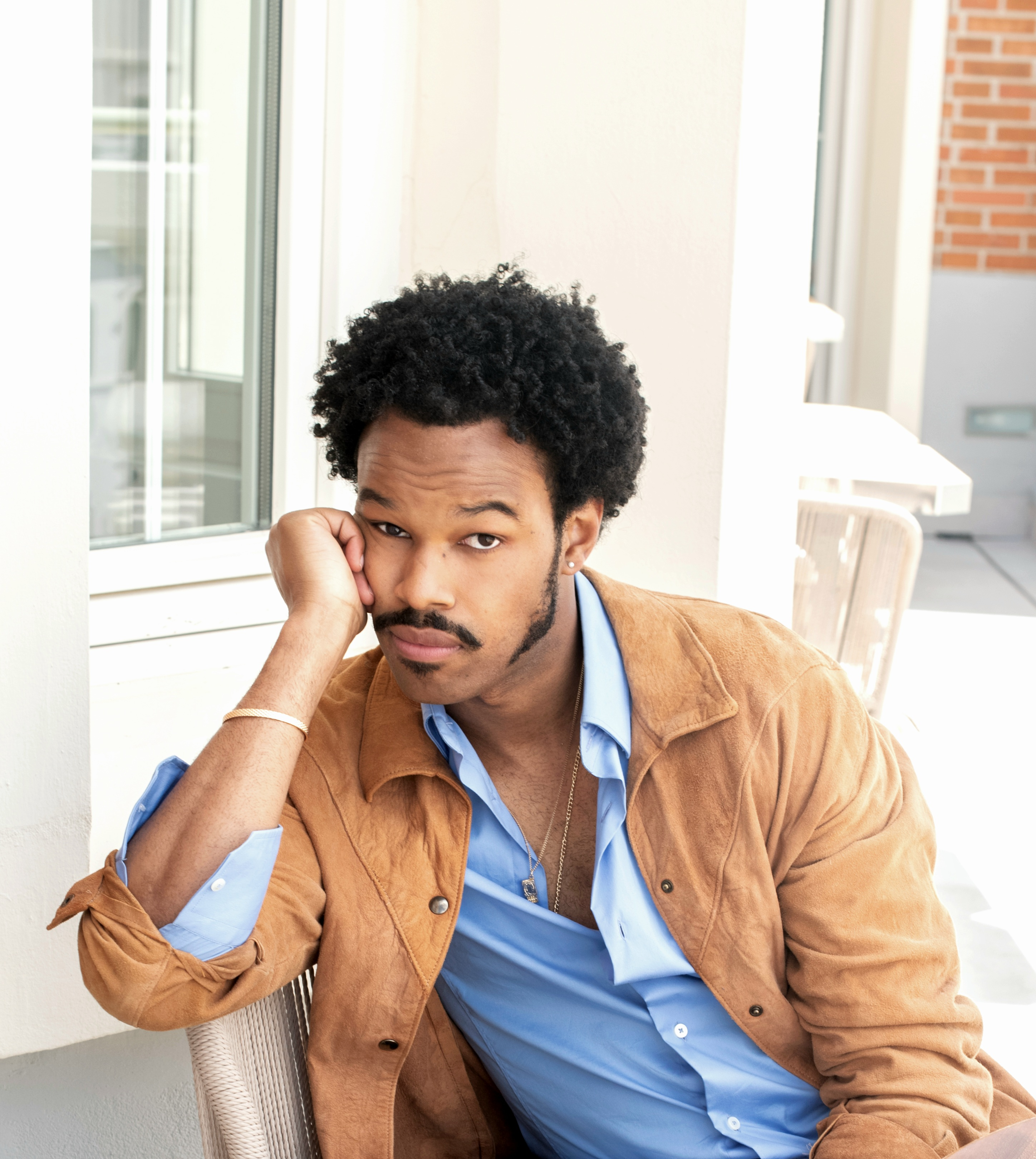
- Born: Santo Domingo, Dominican Republic
- Occupation: Actor

Jean Cruz is a Dominican-Spanish actor. He was born in Santo Domingo and is a university graduate in audiovisual communication. He is mainly known for his role as Jonathan in the Televisión Española series Mercado Central. He is also known for playing Gabriel de Castamar in La cocinera de Castamar.

== Filmography ==
=== Film ===
- El final del tríptico, as Esteban. Directed by William Corr (2017)
- Boca Chica, as Fran. Directed by Gabriella Moses (2022)

=== Television ===
- Familia, (2012)
- Centro médico, as Flaco Varela (2016)
- Mercado Central, as Jonathan Torres (2019)
- La cocinera de Castamar, as Gabriel de Castamar (2021)
- La noche más larga, as Diego (2022)

=== Short films ===
- El cuarto, as Personaje Amarillo. Directed by Mario Blanca and Cristina Edreira (2012)
- Misión M, as Abe Mendy. Directed by Guillermo García González (2013)
- Fito & Pitchi, as Mik. Directed by Fernando Tortosa (2013)
- Violento, as Antonio. Directed by Kando Rodríguez (2013)
- Golpeados, as Álex. Directed by Rosana Lorente (2014)
- Juana, la loca, as Álvaro. Directed by Guillermo Florence (2016)
- Tirolandia, as Eduardo. Directed by Álex Ygoa (2012)

=== Theatre ===
- No es tan fácil, Directed by Clara Cosials
- El funeral de los necios, Directed by Arturo Babel y Darío Sigco
- La historía improgramable, Directed by Luis Sánchez-Polack
- Razas, Directed by Salvador Bolta
- Primer Acto. Directed by Josep María Mestres
- Gazoline. Directed by José Luis Arellano. La Joven Compañía
- El Abrazo a production by Jesús Cimarro and directed by Magüi Mira. (2021)

== Awards and nominations ==
On 19 October 2021, he was nominated for Best Actor Revelation by the Produ Awards for his role as Gabriel de Castamar in La cocinera de Castamar. He was further nominated on 7 February 2022 by the Spanish Actors Union for the same role.
