= Feroz Award for Best Screenplay =

Annual Spanish film award

- Awarded for: Best Screenplay for a Spanish film
- Country: Spain
- Presented by: Asociación de Informadores Cinematográficos de España
- Currently held by: Eduard Sola – A House on Fire (2025)

The Feroz Award for Best Screenplay (Spanish: Premio Feroz al mejor guion) is one of the annual awards given at the Feroz Awards, presented by the Asociación de Informadores Cinematográficos de España.

It was first presented in 2014 and includes both original and adapted screenplays. David Trueba was the first recipient of the award for the film Living Is Easy with Eyes Closed, which he also directed.

== Winners and nominees ==
=== 2010s ===
Year	Recipients(s)	English title	Original title
2014	David Trueba	Living Is Easy with Eyes Closed	Vivir es fácil con los ojos cerrados
2014	Pablo Alén, Breixo Corral	Three Many Weddings	3 bodas de más
2014	Manuel Martín Cuenca, Alejandro Hernández Díaz	Cannibal	Caníbal
2014	Daniel Sánchez Arévalo	Family United	La gran familia española
2014	Isabel Peña, Rodrigo Sorogoyen	Stockholm	
2015	Carlos Vermut	Magical Girl	
2015	Carlos Marqués-Marcet, Clara Roquet	10,000 km	10.000 km
2015	Jaime Rosales, Enric Rufas	Beautiful Youth	Hermosa juventud
2015	Alberto Rodríguez, Rafael Cobos	Marshland	La isla mínima
2015	Jose Mari Goenaga, Aitor Arregi, Jon Garaño	Loreak	
2016	Cesc Gay, Tomàs Aragay	Truman	
2016	Borja Cobeaga	Negotiator	Negociador
2016	Paula Ortiz, Javier García Arredondo	The Bride	La novia
2016	Fernando León de Aranoa, Diego Farias	A Perfect Day	Un día perfecto
2016	Daniel Guzmán	Nothing in Return	A cambio de nada
2017	David Pulido, Raúl Arévalo	The Fury of a Patient Man	Tarde para la ira
2017	Alberto Rodríguez, Rafael Cobos	Smoke & Mirrors	El hombre de las mil caras
2017	Pedro Almodóvar	Julieta	
2017	Patrick Ness	A Monster Calls	
2017	Isabel Peña, Rodrigo Sorogoyen	May God Save Us	Que Dios nos perdone
2018	Carla Simón	Summer 1993	Estiu 1993
2018	Alejandro Hernández, Manuel Martín Cuenca	The Motive	El autor
2018	Diego San José	Bomb Scared	Fe de etarras
2018	Pablo Remón	Can't Say Goodbye	No sé decir adiós
2018	Fernando Navarro, Paco Plaza	Veronica	
2019	Rodrigo Sorogoyen, Isabel Peña	The Realm	El reino
2019	Arantxa Echevarría	Carmen & Lola	Carmen y Lola
2019	Jaime Rosales, Michel Gaztambide, Clara Roquet	Petra	
2019	Carlos Vermut	Quién te cantará	
2019	Celia Rico Clavellino	Journey to a Mother's Room	Viaje al cuarto de una madre

=== 2020s ===
Year	Recipients(s)	English title	Original title
2020	Pedro Almodóvar	Pain and Glory	Dolor y gloria
2020	David Desola, Pedro Rivero	The Platform	El hoyo
2020	Luiso Berdejo, Jose Mari Goenaga	The Endless Trench	La trinchera infinita
2020	Santiago Fillol, Oliver Laxe	Fire Will Come	O que arde
2020	Javier Gullón	Advantages of Travelling by Train	Ventajas de viajar en tren
2021	Pilar Palomero	Schoolgirls	Las niñas
2021	Marina Parés Pulido, David Pérez Sañudo	Ane Is Missing	Ane
2021	Luis López Carrasco, Raúl Liarte	The Year of the Discovery	El año del descubrimiento
2021	Icíar Bollaín, Alicia Luna	Rosa's Wedding	La boda de Rosa
2021	Javier Fesser, Claro García	Unfortunate Stories	Historias lamentables
2022	Fernando León de Aranoa	The Good Boss	El buen patrón
2022	Rodrigo Cortés, David Safier	Love Gets a Room	El amor en su lugar
2022	Clara Roquet	Libertad	
2022	Isa Campo, Icíar Bollaín	Maixabel	
2022	Juanjo Giménez, Pere Altimira	Out of Sync	Tres
2023	Alauda Ruiz de Azúa	Lullaby	Cinco lobitos
2023	Carla Simón, Arnau Vilaró	Alcarràs	
2023	Rodrigo Sorogoyen, Isabel Peña	The Beasts	As bestas
2023	Carlota Pereda	Piggy	Cerdita
2023	Fran Araújo, Isa Campo, Isaki Lacuesta	One Year, One Night	Un año, una noche
2024	Juan Sebastián Vásquez, Alejandro Rojas	Upon Entry	Upon Entry (La llegada)
2024	Estibaliz Urresola Solaguren	20,000 Species of Bees	20.000 especies de abejas
2024	Isabel Coixet, Laura Ferrero	Un amor	
2024	Víctor Erice, Michel Gaztambide	Close Your Eyes	Cerrar los ojos
2024	Elena Martín Gimeno, Clara Roquet	Creatura	
2025	Eduard Sola	A House on Fire	Casa en flames
2025	Marcel Barrena, Beto Marini	The 47	El 47
2025	Javier Macipe	The Blue Star	La estrella azul
2025	Pedro Almodóvar	The Room Next Door	
2025	Eduard Sola, Clara Roquet	The Red Virgin	La virgen roja
2026	Alauda Ruiz de Azúa	Sundays	Los domingos
2026	Jose Mari Goenaga	Maspalomas	
2026	Carla Simón	Romería	
2026	Oliver Laxe, Santiago Fillol	Sirāt	
2026	Eva Libertad	Deaf	Sorda

== See also ==
- Goya Award for Best Original Screenplay
- Goya Award for Best Adapted Screenplay
