= Mother (2017 Spanish film) =

2017 film by Rodrigo Sorogoyen

- Film poster
- Directed by: Rodrigo Sorogoyen
- Written by: Rodrigo Sorogoyen
- Produced by: Rodrigo Sorogoyen; María del Puy Alvarado
- Starring: Álvaro Balas; Blanca Apilánez; Marta Nieto; Miriam Correa
- Cinematography: Alejandro de Pablo
- Music by: Olivier Arson
- Production companies: Apache Films; Caballo Films; Malvalanda
- Release date: March 17, 2017 (Málaga)
- Running time: 18 minutes
- Country: Spain
- Language: Spanish

Mother (Spanish: Madre) is a 2017 Spanish short drama film, directed by Rodrigo Sorogoyen. It premiered at the 2017 Málaga Film Festival and was also screened at the 2017 Toronto International Film Festival. It won the Goya Award for Best Fictional Short Film at the 32nd Goya Awards and was nominated for the Academy Award for Best Live Action Short Film at the 91st Academy Awards.

== Plot ==
Marta and her mother come home and have a casual conversation that is interrupted by a phone call from Marta's 6-year-old son. He informs her that his father (her ex husband), with whom he is on holiday in southern France, has left him alone on a beach and he is scared because he does not know where his father is. Marta begins to question him about his father's whereabouts, how long he's been gone and where the boy is. Her son does not know where he is, and is even unsure as to whether he is in France or Spain. Marta asks him who is around him and he says no one. As Marta begins to become more and more concerned, she discovers that her son's phone is almost out of power. Marta has her mother talk to her son while she calls a friend of the father's, but the friend knows nothing of his whereabouts, having not spoken to him for some time. Her son asks to talk to her and the two get more and more scared and panicked.

The son's phone call is dropped. Marta calls the police who ask her several questions and then tell her to come in and make a report. She asks them if they can trace the call and they repeat that she must come in to make a report. Marta, now frustrated and angry, resolves to drive to France to look for her son. She leaves the apartment, but as she is going down the stairs the phone rings again.

It is her son. She asks him to describe the beach or anything he might have seen going there. She tells him to start walking down the beach, but her mother says that he should stay where he is. In the midst of this conversation, he tells her that an unknown man has arrived. He tells Marta that the man is alone and is seen relieving himself. The man is waving the boy over and her son reports being scared and that he does not want to talk to the man.

Marta tells him to run. She tells him to run and hide, which he does. He tells her that the man is looking for him, and then Marta hears the man's voice asking the son a question before the phone call is dropped again. Marta leaves the apartment. The film ends with a brief shot of a deserted beach.

== Feature length adaptation ==
The short film was expanded into a 2019 same-titled feature film by the same director, Rodrigo Sorogoyen.
