= Becoming Ana =

- Film poster
- Spanish: La mitad de Ana
- Directed by: Marta Nieto
- Screenplay by: Marta Nieto; Beatriz Herzog
- Produced by: María Zamora; Stefan Schmitz; Ramón Campos
- Starring: Marta Nieto; Noa Álvarez; Nahuel Pérez Biscayart
- Cinematography: Julián Elizalde
- Production companies: Elastica; Avalon; Mr. Fields and Friends Cinema; Studiocanal
- Distributed by: Elastica
- Release dates: 21 October 2024 (Seminci); 10 January 2025 (Spain)
- Countries: Spain; France
- Languages: Spanish; French

Becoming Ana (Spanish: La mitad de Ana, lit. 'Half of Ana') is a 2024 drama film directed by Marta Nieto (in her directorial debut film), who also stars alongside Noa Álvarez and Nahuel Pérez Biscayart.

== Plot ==
The plot follows the plight of museum guard Ana, who needs to learn to grapple with her 8-year-old child Son's exploration of self-identity and trans youth.

== Cast ==
- Marta Nieto
- Noa Álvarez as Son
- Nahuel Pérez Biscayart
- Sonia Almarcha as Blanca
- Lorena López as Patricia
- Pablo Alamá as Pau
- Arnau Comas as Raúl
- Paula Braguinsky as Eva

== Production ==
Nieto first began to develop the project for her feature film debut in 2019 within the Spanish Film Academy's 'Residencias Academia de Cine' program. As a part of the process, she wrote and directed the short film Son, which screened at the Seminci and LesGaiCineMad. She then joined forces with Beatriz Herzog to write a "bigger, more complex" film. The film is an Elastica and Avalon co-production with Mr Fields and Friends Cinema and Studiocanal, with the participation of RTVE, Movistar Plus+, and À Punt and the backing from Ayuntamiento de Madrid, the Madrid regional administration, ICAA and IVC. Julián Elizalde served as director of photography. Shooting locations included Madrid.

== Release ==
The film had its world premiere at the 69th Valladolid International Film Festival (Seminci) on 21 October 2024, in competition for the Golden Spike. Distributed by Elastica Films, it was scheduled to be released theatrically in Spain on 13 December 2024. The release date was later set for 10 January 2025.

== Reception ==
Javier Ocaña of El País wrote that "the uneveness of the situations is constant in a work that is as ambitious as it is difficult to crystallize".

Pere Vall of Fotogramas rated the film 4 out of 5 stars, billing it as a "a film with strong social and sociological overtones, but which does not rule out a foray into fantasy".

Philipp Engel of Cinemanía rated Becoming Ana 3 out of 5 stars, declaring it "a film that makes a virtue of modesty", "although it runs the risk of seeming too self-absorbed".

== See also ==
- List of Spanish films of 2025
