= The Longest Night (TV series) =

Spanish TV series (2022)

- Spanish: La noche más larga
- Created by: Víctor Sierra; Xosé Morais
- Directed by: Óscar Pedraza; Moisés Ramos
- Starring: Alberto Ammann; Luis Callejo; Bárbara Goenaga
- Country of origin: Spain
- Original language: Spanish
- No. of seasons: 1
- No. of episodes: 6

Production
- Production company: Lazona

Original release
- Network: Netflix
- Release: 8 July 2022

The Longest Night (Spanish: La noche más larga; known during the production stage as Baruca) is a Spanish prison thriller television series created by Víctor Sierra and Xosé Morais. Its ensemble cast includes Luis Callejo, Alberto Ammann and Barbara Goenaga. It was released on Netflix in July 2022. The series ended on a cliffhanger; as of October 2024, it was confirmed that there has been no information released to confirm nor deny that a second season will be produced.

== Plot ==
The plot concerns the attempts to extract a newly captured serial killer, Simón Lago, from a psychiatric hospital prison where he’s being held for the night – which happens to be Christmas Eve. Lago has already arranged to have the daughter of the prison warden, Hugo Roca, taken hostage, with a threat that she will be murdered if Lago is released to anyone. The "anyone" Lago is rightfully concerned about is a large assault team, sent by high ranking officials to kill Lago to ensure he can not reveal the secrets he knows in open court. The deadly standoff is made worse when the most violent patients start killing the others, thinking they will be able to arrange an escape, while the relatively more subdued patients wreak havoc in their own ways, and Simon takes joy in killing random patients. Despite the inmates finally helping kill some of the attackers, the siege continues and one of the guards attempts to hand over Lago to the assault team, who are revealed to be crooked cops.

== Cast ==
- Luis Callejo as Simón Lago
- Alberto Ammann as Hugo Roca
- María Caballero as Laura
- José Luis García Pérez as Lennon
- Daniel Albaladejo as Cherokee
- Cecilia Freire as Manuela Muñoz
- Sabela Arán as Macarena Montes
- Bárbara Goenaga as Elisa Montero
- Xavier Deive as Bastos
- Lucía Díez as Nuria
- Laia Manzanares as Sara Oliver
- Alejandro Tous
- Jean Cruz as Diego
- David Solans as Javi
- Roberto Álamo as Ruso
- Javier Bódalo as Jeringa
- Elisa Matilla as Rosa
- Pablo Alamá as Rey
- César Mateo as Willy
- Ángel Pardo as Andrés

== Production ==
The series was created by Víctor Sierra and Xosé Morais and directed by Óscar Pedraza and Moisés Ramos. It was produced by LaZona for Netflix. Shooting began in 2021. Shooting locations included Madrid and Aranjuez.

== Release ==
Consisting of 6 episodes, the series was released on 8 July 2022 on Netflix.
