= Mother (2019 Spanish film) =

2019 film directed by Rodrigo Sorogoyen

- Poster
- Spanish: Madre
- Directed by: Rodrigo Sorogoyen
- Written by: Rodrigo Sorogoyen; Isabel Peña
- Starring: Marta Nieto; Jules Porier; Àlex Brendemühl
- Cinematography: Álex de Pablo
- Music by: Olivier Arson
- Production companies: Amalur Pictures; Arcadia Motion Pictures; Caballo Films; Malvalanda; Noodles Production; Le Pacte; TVE; Movistar+ Canal+
- Release date: 15 November 2019 (Spain)
- Running time: 128 minutes
- Countries: Spain; France
- Language: Spanish
- Box office: $2 million

Mother (Spanish: Madre) is a 2019 Spanish-French drama film directed by Rodrigo Sorogoyen and co-written by Isabel Peña. The film is based on the 2017 short film of the same name directed by Sorogoyen. It stars Marta Nieto, Jules Porier and Àlex Brendemühl.

The film received three nominations at the 34th Goya Awards, including Best Actress for Marta Nieto, her first Goya nomination and Best Adapted Screenplay for Rodrigo Sorogoyen and Isabel Peña.

== Plot ==
Ten years ago, Elena received a call in which Ivan, her six-year-old son, told her that he was lost on a beach in France and that he could not find his father. It was the last thing he knew about him. Now Elena lives on that beach, works as a manager in a restaurant and is starting to leave that dark tunnel where she stayed anchored all this time.

== Cast ==
- Marta Nieto as Elena
- Jules Porier as Jean
- Àlex Brendemühl as Joseba
- Anne Consigny as Léa
- Frédéric Pierrot as Grégory

== Production ==
The film was shot largely in the seaside town of Vieux-Boucau-les-Bains.

== Release ==
Mother was the opening film for the Seville European Film Festival (SEFF) in 2019.

The film was released in cinemas in Spain on 15 November 2019. It competed in the Orizzonti Section at the 76th Venice International Film Festival.

== Reception ==
=== Box office ===
Mother grossed $969,100 worldwide.

=== Critical response ===
On review aggregator website Rotten Tomatoes, the film holds an approval rating of 92% based on 26 reviews, with an average rating of 7.4/10. On Metacritic, the film holds a rating of 76 out of 100, based on 4 critics, indicating "generally favorable reviews". Ryan Lattanzio from Indiewire gave the film a B writing that the film "turns out to be the least twisted, and most empathetic, entry in the damaged mother movie canon in some time.".

Kevin Crust for the Los Angeles Times commented that "despite its melancholy bearing, "Madre" is a hopeful meditation on grief and memory".

=== Awards and nominations ===
Year	Award	Category	Recipient(s)	Result	Ref.
2019	Seville European Film Festival	Best Film	Mother	Nominated	
2019	Seville European Film Festival	Best Actress (ex aequo with Zorica Nusheva for God Exists, Her Name Is Petrunija)	Marta Nieto	Won	
2019	Premios CEC	Best Actress	Marta Nieto	Won	
2019	Premios CEC	Best Adapted Screenplay	Rodrigo Sorogoyen and Isabel Peña	Nominated	
2019	Goya Awards	Best Actress	Marta Nieto	Nominated	
2019	Goya Awards	Best Adapted Screenplay	Rodrigo Sorogoyen and Isabel Peña	Nominated	
2019	Goya Awards	Best Editing	Alberto del Campo	Nominated	
2019	Venice International Film Festival	Orizzonti Award for Best Film	Mother	Nominated	
2019	Venice International Film Festival	Orizzonti Award for Best Actress	Marta Nieto	Won	
2020	Feroz Awards	Best Main Actress	Marta Nieto	Nominated	
2020	Spanish Actors Union	Best Female Lead Performance in Film	Marta Nieto	Nominated	
2020	European Film Awards	Best Actress	Marta Nieto	Nominated	
2020	Gaudí Awards	Best Supporting Actor	Àlex Brendemühl	Nominated	
