= Isabel Peña =

Spanish screenwriter

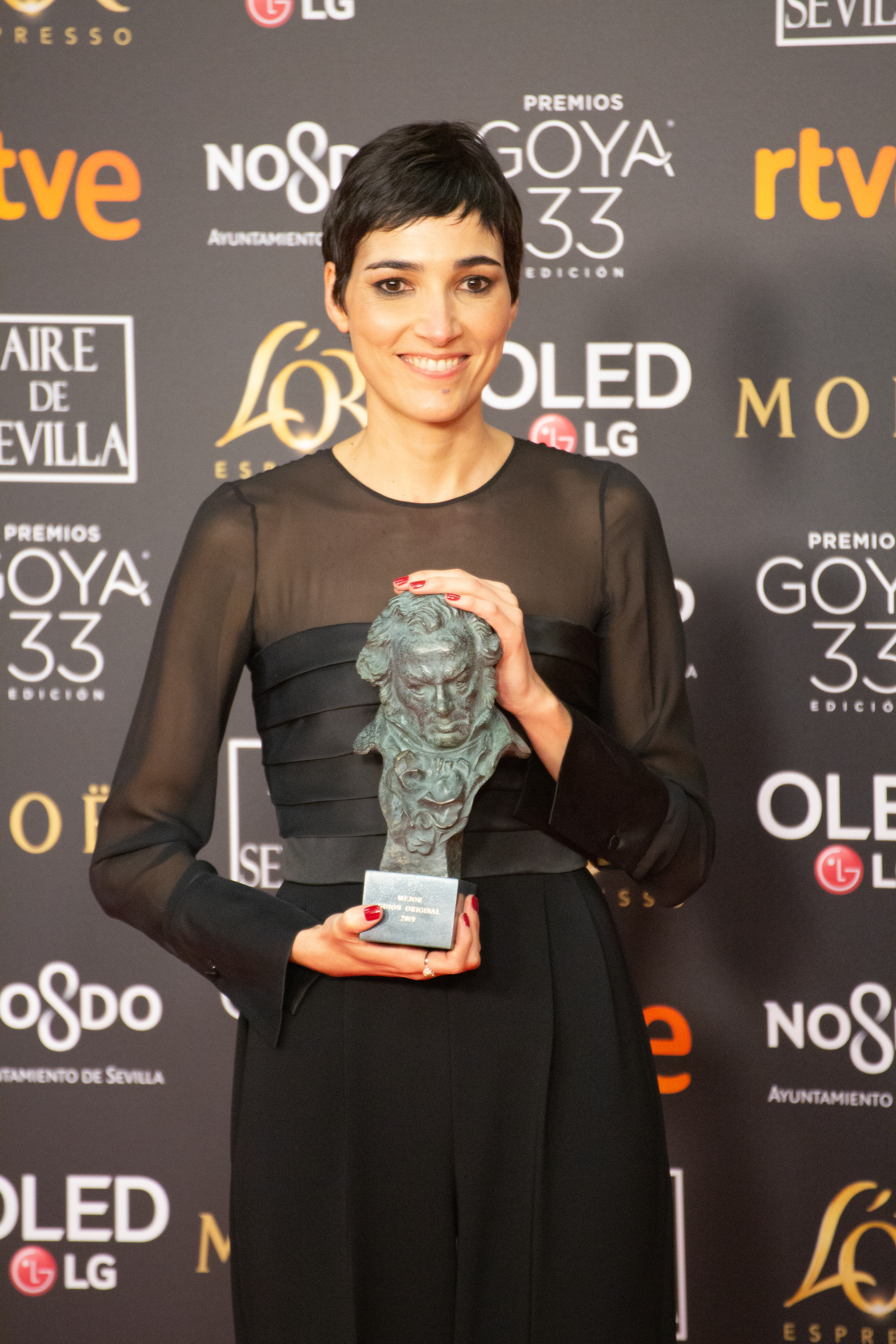
- At the 33rd Goya Awards in 2019
- Born: Isabel Peña Domingo; 1983 (age 41–42); Zaragoza, Spain
- Occupation: Screenwriter

Isabel Peña Domingo (born 1983) is a Spanish screenwriter. She often works in tandem with Rodrigo Sorogoyen.

== Biography ==
Born in 1983 in Zaragoza, she became a fan of classical cinema when she was very young. She earned a degree in Comunicación Audiovisual from the University of Navarre and a degree in scriptwriting from the Escuela de Cinematografía y del Audiovisual de la Comunidad de Madrid (ECAM).

She worked for the first time with Sorogoyen (whom she had met at the ECAM) in the screenwriting team of the television series Impares.

== Works ==
Film

- 2013: Stockholm
- 2016: Que Dios nos perdone (May God Save Us)
- 2018: El reino (The Realm).
- 2019: Madre (Mother)
- 2022: As bestas (The Beasts)
- 2022: Jaula (The Chalk Line)
- 2024: El llanto (The Wailing)

Television

- Impares (17 episodes, 2008).
- Bicho malo (32 episodes, 2009).
- La pecera de Eva (57 episodes, 2010).
- Todo por el juego (2018).
- Antidisturbios (2020; also credited as "creator")

== Accolades ==
| Year | Award | Category | Work | Result | Ref. |
|---|---|---|---|---|---|
| 2014 | 1st Feroz Awards | Best Screenplay | Stockholm | Nominated | |
| 2017 | 4th Feroz Awards | Best Screenplay | May God Save Us | Nominated | |
| 2017 | 31st Goya Awards | Best Original Screenplay | May God Save Us | Nominated | |
| 2019 | 6th Feroz Awards | Best Screenplay | The Realm | Won | |
| 2019 | 33rd Goya Awards | Best Original Screenplay | The Realm | Won | |
| 2020 | 34th Goya Awards | Best Adapted Screenplay | Mother | Nominated | |
| 2023 | 37th Goya Awards | Best Original Screenplay | The Beasts | Won | |
