= 38th Guadalajara International Film Festival =

2023 film festival

- Official poster by Liniers.
- Opening film: Asteroid City
- Location: Guadalajara, Mexico
- Awards: Mezcal Award: Heroic; Ibero-American Film: I Have Electric Dreams
- Festival date: June 3–9, 2023

Guadalajara International Film Festival
- 2024 2022

The 38th Guadalajara International Film Festival took place from June 3 to 9, 2023, in Guadalajara, Mexico. Heroic received the Mezcal Award while Costa Rican film I Have Electric Dreams won the Best Ibero-American Film award.

The festival opening ceremony took place at Telmex Auditorium and was hosted by Andrés Zuno. At the ceremony, Raúl Padilla López was honored for his work in the festival. Padilla López served as president for the festival until his death in April 2023. Mexican actress Arcelia Ramírez and Italian film editor Roberto Perpignani received special achievement awards. American film Asteroid City, directed by Wes Anderson, was the festival's opening film.

== Juries ==
=== Official competition ===
Mezcal Award

- Pituka Ortega Heilbron, Panamanian filmmaker
- Gregory Nava, American director and writer
- Diego Calva, Mexican actor
- Melissa Cobb, American producer
- Paolo Genovese, Italian director

Ibero-American Fiction Feature Film

- Gabriel Nuncio, Mexican director, producer, screenwriter and actor
- Claudia Sainte-Luce, Mexican writer, director and actress
- Andrés Wood, Chilean director
- Gustavo Castillón, Mexican producer
- Paulina Dávila, Colombian actress

Ibero-American Documentary Feature Film

- Claudia Becerril Bulos, Mexican cinematographer
- Paulina Suárez, Mexican director of Ambulante
- Anna Saura, Spanish producer

Ibero-American Short Film

- Armando Espitia, Mexican actor
- Roger Durling, American SBIFF director
- Andrés Almeida, Mexican actor
- Marianna Vargas, Dominican film commissioner of DGCINE
- Luis Rosales, Mexican casting director

Maguey Award

- Adrián Silvestre, Spanish director
- Eréndira Ibarra, Mexican actress
- Ximena Romo, Mexican actress

Made in Jalisco

- Leonardo Ortizgris, Mexican actor
- Mariana Chenillo, Mexican director and screenwriter
- Pablo Zimbrón Alva, Mexican producer
- Cassandra Ciangherotti, Mexican actress

Socio-Environmental Cinema Award

- Cristo Fernández, Mexican actor
- Martha Reyes Arias, Mexican actress
- Carmen Elisa Gómez, Mexican researcher
- Andrés Castillo, Ecuatorian musician and cultural promoter

International Animation Feature Film and Rigo Mora Award

- Alberto Montt, Chilean-Ecuatorian illustrator
- João Gonzalez, Portuguese director and animator
- Cruz Contreras, Mexican animator
- Lefteris Becerra, Mexican researcher, journalist and academic

Young Mezcal

- Fanfan Zhou, California Institute of the Arts representant
- Yamir Perea, Centro de Capacitación Cinematográfica representant
- Valeria Contreras, Columbia University School of the Arts representant
- Fernando Ramírez, University Centre of Art, Architecture and Design (University of Guadalajara) representant
- Adrián Morales, National School of Cinematographic Arts (UNAM) representant
- Emilio Sillero, Escuela Nacional de Experimentación y Realización Cinematográfica (ENERC) representant
- Irving Colorado, Escuela Veracruzana de Cine Luis Buñuel representant
- Tommaso Diaceri, Fondazione Centro Sperimentale di Cinematografia representant
- Nicolà Folin, Fondazione Centro Sperimentale di Cinematografia representant
- Samuel Vaca, ITESO, Universidad Jesuita de Guadalajara, representant
- Sergio Anchondo, Monterrey Institute of Technology and Higher Education representant
- Sergio García, Monterrey Institute of Technology and Higher Education representant
- Paola Arellano, Universidad de Artes Digitales (UAD) representant
- Hugo Rocha, Universidad de Medios Audiovisuales (CAAV) representant
- Andrea Hernández, Universidad del Valle de Atemajac (UNIVA) representant
- Lydia Acevedo, University of Southern California representant

=== Independent juries ===
FIPRESCI

- Valentina Giraldo Sánchez, Colombian critic
- Andrew Kendall, Guyanese critic
- Ivonete Pinto, Brazilian journalist and film critic

FEISAL

- Guillermo Vaidovits, Mexican director of the master's degree in Film Studios of UDEG
- Ivette Liang, Cuban-Colombian Head of the Production Department of EICTV and Director of Nuevas Miradas, and film producer
- Juan Mora Catlett, Mexican film director, editor and screenwriter
- Busi Cortés, Mexican director, screenwriter and scriptwriter

== Official selections ==
The following films were selected for the official competitions:

=== Mezcal Award ===
Highlighted title indicates section's best film winner.

English title	Original title	Director(s)	Production countrie(s)
Adolfo		Sofía Auza	Mexico, United States
Love & Mathematics	Amor y matemáticas	Claudia Sainte-Luce	Mexico
Heroic	Heroico	David Zonana	Mexico, Sweden
Martinez	Martínez	Lorena Padilla	Mexico
Women of the Dawn	Mujeres del alba	Jimena Montemayor Loyo	Mexico
Rage	Rabia	Jorge Michel Grau	Mexico
Ch'ul be, Sacred Path	Ch'ul be, senda sagrada	Humberto Gómez Pérez	Mexico
The Invisible Frontier	La frontera invisible	Mariana Flores Villalba	Mexico
Kenya		Gisela Delgadillo	Mexico
Tushkua		Ludovic Bonleux	Mexico
A Wolfpack Called Ernesto	Una jauría llamada Ernesto	Everardo González	Mexico

(HJ) indicates film eligible for the Hecho en Jalisco Award.

=== Ibero-American Fiction Feature Film ===
Highlighted title indicates section's best film winner.

English title	Original title	Director(s)	Production countrie(s)
20,000 Species of Bees (MG)	20.000 especies de abejas	Estibaliz Urresola Solaguren	Spain
Almamula (MG)		Juan Sebastián Torales	Argentina, France, Italia
In the Company of Women (MG)	Las buenas compañías	Silvia Munt	Spain
Diógenes		Leonardo Barbuy La Torre	Peru, France, Colombia
Great Yarmouth: Provisional Figures		Marco Martins	Portugal, United Kingdom, France
Sister & Sister	Las hijas	Kattia G. Zúñiga	Panama, Chile
The Fishbowl (SE)	La pecera	Glorimar Marrero-Sánchez	United States, Spain, Puerto Rico
Octopus Skin	La piel pulpo	Ana Cristina Barragán	Ecuador, Mexico, Greece, Germany, France, Italy
I Have Electric Dreams	Tengo sueños eléctricos	Valentina Maurel	Costa Rica, France, Belgium

(MG) indicates film eligible for the Maguey Award that include LGBTQ+ themes.
(SE) indicates film eligible for the Socio-Environmental Cinema Award.

=== Ibero-American Documentary Feature Film ===
Highlighted title indicates section's best film winner.

English title	Original title	Director(s)	Production countrie(s)
Light Falls Vertical	Ara La Llum Cau Vertical	Efthymia Zymvragaki	Spain, Germany, Italy, Netherlands
The Bilbaos	Los Bilbao	Pedro Speroni	Argentina
The Castle (MG)	El castillo	Martin Benchimol	Argentina, France
Fauna		Pau Faus	Spain
Alien Island	Isla Alien	Cristóbal Valenzuela Berrios	Chile, Italy
Calls from Moscow (MG)	Llamadas desde Moscú	Luis Alejandro Yero	Cuba, Germany, Norway
The Eternal Memory	La memoria infinita	Maite Alberdi	Chile
Notes For a Film	Notas para una película	Ignacio Agüero	Chile, Francia
A House for Wandering Souls	O Auto das Ánimas	Pablo Lago Dantas	Brazil, Spain
Samuel and the Light	Samuel e a Luz	Vinícius Girnys	Brazil, France

(MG) indicates film eligible for the Maguey Award that include LGBTQ+ themes.

=== Ibero-American Short Film ===
Highlighted title indicates section's best film winner.

English title	Original title	Director(s)	Production countrie(s)
The Things to Come	L'avenir	Santiago Ráfales	Spain
Dust Trails	Caminos de tierra	Miranda Pérez Ledesma	Mexico
The House of Sand	La casa de arena	Luis Vicente Fresno	Chile
Ashen	Cenizo	Gustavo Hernández de Anda	Mexico
Exceptional Tales from a Young Female Team: Reds	Cuentos excepcionales de un equipo juvenil femeino: Las Rojas	Tom Espinoza	Argentina, Venezuela
The Cage	La jaula	Cesar Saldivar	Mexico
Lava		Carmen Jiménez	Spain
Look, Kid	Mira, niño	Sergio Avellaneda Belmonte	Spain
Human Nature	Naturaleza humana	Mónica Lima	Portugal, Germany
Saturn	Saturno	André Guiomar, Luís Costa	Portugal
The Treasure	El tesoro	David Rodríguez Estrada	Mexico, United States
An Avocador Pit	Um Caroço de Abacate	Ary Zara	Portugal
Ice Love	Amor ice	Katy Araiza	Mexico
Aqueronte		Manuel Muñoz Rivas	Spain
Does a Snail Dream of Home?	¿El caracol sueña en casa?	Luis Armando Sosa Gil	Mexico, Portugal, Hungary, Belgium
In My Skin	En mi piel	Sándor M. Salas	Spain
Lucas		Jessica Quiroz	Mexico
Madre nuestra		David Paredes	Colombia, Cuba
The Sea is Also Yours	O Mar Também é Seu	Michelle Coelho	Brazil, Cuba
Your Voice is Within	Su voz está dentro	Mariana Flores Villalba	Mexico
A Robust Heart	Un corazón más contundente	Argentina, United States, United Kingdom	
The View from Up Above	La vista desde arriba	Rafael Martínez Sánchez	Mexico

=== Maguey Award ===
The following list consists of the films eligible for the Maguey Award that are not listed in the previous competition tables. The films in contention for both the Maguey Award and other competition section appear with the symbol (MG) next to it.

English title	Original title	Director(s)	Production countrie(s)
Cross Dreamers		Soledad Velasco	Argentina
I Woke Up with a Dream	Desperté con un sueño	Pablo Solarz	Argentina, Uruguay
In Bed	Ke’elu En Machar	Nitzan Gilady	Israel
Kokomo City		D. Smith	United States
Little Richard: I Am Everything		Lisa Cortés	United States
Liuben		Venci D. Kostov	Spain, Bulgaria
Medusa Deluxe		Thomas Hardiman	United Kingdom
Mutt		Vuk Lungulov-Klotz	United States
Passages		Ira Sachs	France
Till the End of the Night	Bis ans Ende der Nacht	Christoph Hochhäusler	Germany

=== Hecho en Jalisco ===
The following list consists of the films eligible for the Hecho en Jalisco that are not listed in the previous competition tables. The films in contention for both the Made in Jalisco and other competition section appear with the symbol (HJ) next to it.

English title	Original title	Director(s)	Production countrie(s)
Over There...	Allá, cartas al corazón	Montserrat Larqué	Mexico
Net: Games of Life	Redes: Juegos de la vida	César Aréchiga	Mexico
Telephone	Teléfono	Jerzain Ortega	Mexico
A Territory Without Us	Un territorio sin nosotrxs	Pablo Márquez Cervantes	Mexico
He, Behind the Gun	Él, detrás del arma	Gabriel Esdras	Mexico
The Legacy of Fire	El legado del fuego	Eliseo Chirino Sandoval	Mexico
The Old Had and the Crow	La vieja y el cuervo	María Lucía Bayardo Dodge	Mexico

=== Socio-Environmental Cinema Award ===
The following list consists of the films eligible for the Socio-Environmental Cinema Award that are not listed in the previous competition tables. The films in contention for both the Socio-Environmental Cinema Award and other competition section appear with the symbol (SE) next to it.

English title	Original title	Director(s)	Production countrie(s)
City on the Back	Ciudad a la espalda	Paola Rodas Ziadé	Ecuador
Deep Rising		Matthieu Rytz	United States
We Are Guardians		Chelsea Greene, Rob Grobman, Edivan Guajajara	Brazil, United States

=== International Animation Feature Film ===
Highlighted title indicates section's best film winner.

English title	Original title	Director(s)	Production countrie(s)
Art College 1994		Liu Jian	China
Black Is Beltza II: Ainhoa		Fermin Muguruza	Spain, Argentina
Blind Willow, Sleeping Woman	Saules aveugles, femme endormie	Pierre Földes	France, Canada, Netherlands, Luxembourg
Chicken for Linda!	Linda veut du poulet!	Chiara Malta, Sébastien Laudenbach	France, Italy
Little Nicholas: Happy As Can Be	Le Petit Nicolas: Qu'est-ce qu'on attend pour être heureux?	Amandine Fredon, Benjamin Massoubre	France, Luxembourg
No Dogs or Italians Allowed	Interdit aux chiens et aux italiens	Alain Ughetto	France, Italy, Switzerland, Belgium, Portugal
A Kingdom for Us All	Un reino para todos nosotros	Miguel Angel Uriegas	Mexico, Colombia

=== Rigo Mora Award ===
Highlighted title indicates section's best film winner.

English title	Original title	Director(s)	Production countrie(s)
Aaaah!		Osman Cerfon	France
Canary		Pierre-Hughes Dallaire, Benoit Therriault	Canada
Flesh of God	Carne de Dios	Patricio Plaza	Argentina, Mexico
Christopher at Sea		Tom CJ Brown	France, United Kingdom, United States
Compound Eyes of Tropical	Ojos compuestos de tropical	Zhang Xu Zhan	Taiwan
Eeva		Lucija Mrzljak, Morten Tšinakov	Estonia, Croatia
Humo	Fumme	Rita Basulto	Mexico
It's Nice in Here		Robert-Jonathan Koeyers	Netherlands
Money and Happiness		Nikola Majdak, Ana Nedeljković	Serbia, Eslovakia, Eslovenia
The Most Boring Granny in the Whole World	Die allerlangweiligste Oma auf der ganzen Welt	Damaris Zielke	Germany
Ninety-Five Senses		Jerusha Hess, Jared Hess	United States
O Cosaco Rosa	La Veste Rose	Mónica Santos	Portugal, France
Pachyderme		Stéphanie Clément	France
Teacups		Alec Green, Finbar Watson	Australia, Ireland
The Temple	Le Temple	Alain Fournier	Canada

== Official awards ==
The following awards were presented:

=== Mezcal Award ===
- Mezcal Award: Heroic by David Zonana
- Best Director: Gisela Delgadillo for Kenya
- Best Actor: Fernando Cuautle for Heroic
- Best Actress: Rocío de la Mañana for Adolfo
- Best Cinematography: Santiago Sánchez for Women of the Dawn
- Special Mention: A Wolfpack Called Ernesto by Everardo González

=== Ibero-American Fiction Feature Film ===
- Best Film: I Have Electric Dreams by Valentina Maurel
- Best Director: Estibaliz Urresola Solaguren for 20,000 Species of Bees
- Best Actor: Reinaldo Amien for I Woke Up with a Dream
- Best Actress: Beatriz Batarda for Great Yarmouth: Provisional Figures
- Best Screenplay: Marco Martins and Ricardo Adolfo for Great Yarmouth: Provisional Figures
- Best First Feature: 20,000 Species of Bees by Estibaliz Urresola Solaguren
- Special Mention: Sister & Sister by Cala Rossel

=== Ibero-American Documentary Feature Film ===
- Best Documentary Film: Samuel and the Light by Vinícius Girnys
- Best Director: Pau Faus for Fauna
- Best Cinematography: Nico Miranda and Fernando Lorenzale for The Castle

=== Ibero-American Short Film ===
- An Avocado Pit by Ary Zara

=== Maguey Award ===
- Maguey Award: Kenya by Gisela Delgadillo
- Jury Prize: Medusa Deluxe by Thomas Hardiman
- Best Performance: Ensemble cast of 20,000 Species of Bees

=== Made in Jalisco ===
- Best Feature Film: Martinez by Lorena Padilla
- Best Short Film: He, Behind the Gun by Gabriel Esdras
- Special Mention: A Territory Without Us by Pablo Márquez Cervantes

=== Socio-Environmental Cinema Award ===
- City on the Back by Paola Rodas Ziadé

=== International Animation Feature Film ===
- Best Film: Chicken for Linda! by Chiara Malta and Sébastien Laudenbach
- Special Mention: No Dogs or Italians Allowed by Alain Ughetto

=== Rigo Mora Award ===
- Rigo Mora Award: Flesh of God by Patricio Plaza
- Special Mention: Ninety-five Senses by Jerusha Hess and Jared Hess

=== Young Mezcal ===
- Young Mezcal Award: Heroic by David Zonana
- Special Mention: Kenya by Gisela Delgadillo

=== Audience Award ===
- Kenya by Gisela Delgadillo

== Independent awards ==
=== FIPRESCI Prize ===
- Best Film: Heroic by David Zonana

=== FEISAL Prizes ===
- Best Film: Samuel and the Light by Vinícius Girnys
- Special Mention: Calls from Moscow by Luis Alejandro Yero
