= The Uncovering =

- Theatrical release poster
- Spanish: El desentierro
- Directed by: Nacho Ruipérez
- Screenplay by: Nacho Ruipérez; Mario Fernández-Alonso
- Produced by: Ximo Pérez
- Starring: Leonardo Sbaraglia; Jan Cornet; Michel Noher; Raúl Prieto; Francesc Garrido; Jelena Jovanova; Nesrin Cavadzade; Jordi Rebellón; Cristina Perales; Arben Bajraktaraj; Ana Torrent
- Cinematography: Javier Salmones; Carlos Pérez
- Edited by: Teresa Font
- Music by: Arnau Bataller
- Distributed by: Filmax (Spain); Primer Plano (Argentina)
- Release dates: November 2018 (Seville); 16 November 2018 (Spain); 19 September 2019 (Argentina)
- Countries: Spain; Argentina
- Languages: Spanish; Catalan; Albanian; English

The Uncovering (Spanish: El desentierro) is a 2018 Spanish-Argentine crime thriller film directed by Nacho Ruipérez. Its cast features Leonardo Sbaraglia, Michel Noher, Jan Cornet, Ana Torrent, Jelena Jovanova, and Nesrin Cavadzade.

== Plot ==
Returned from Buenos Aires to a Valencian town to attend the funeral of his uncle Félix (a prominent local politician), Jordi comes across cousin Diego, and the two begin to dig into the keys of the disappearance of his father Pau 20 years ago, crossing paths with a series of criminals and pimps.

== Cast ==
- Michel Noher as Jordi
- Jordi Rebellón as Félix
- Leonardo Sbaraglia as Pau
- Jan Cornet as Diego
- Raúl Prieto as Richi
- Ana Torrent as Dora
- Jelena Jovanova as Vera
- Nesrin Cavadzade
- Cristina Perales
- Francesc Garrido
- Arben Bajraktaraj

== Production ==
The Uncovering is a Spanish-Argentine co-production by El Desentierro AIE and Aleph Media. Filming began in the ricefields near Sueca on 12 September 2017. The film features dialogue in Spanish, Valencian (Catalan), English, and Albanian.

== Release ==
For its world premiere, the film made it to the slate of the 15th Seville European Film Festival. Distributed by Filmax, it was released theatrically in Spain on 16 November 2018.

== Reception ==
The review in Cinemanía rated the film 2½ out of 5 stars, deeming the plot to be "complex and too often confusing".

Beatriz Martínez of Fotogramas rated the film 3 out of 5 stars, lamenting that "the narration is a bit clumsy and uneven" as "the film [still] has grit and a good dose of expressive murkiness", highlighting the recreation of the Levantine 1990s as the best thing about the film.

== Accolades ==
Year	Award	Category	Nominee(s)	Result	Ref.
2018	1st Valencian Audiovisual Awards	Best Film		Won	
2018	1st Valencian Audiovisual Awards	Best Director	Nacho Ruipérez	Won	
2018	1st Valencian Audiovisual Awards	Best Screenplay	Nacho Ruipérez, Mario Fernández	Won	
2018	1st Valencian Audiovisual Awards	Best Original Score	Arnau Bataller	Nominated	
2018	1st Valencian Audiovisual Awards	Best Cinematography	Javier Salmones, Carlos Pérez	Nominated	
2018	1st Valencian Audiovisual Awards	Best Editing	Teresa Font	Won	
2018	1st Valencian Audiovisual Awards	Best Art Direction	Abdón Alcañiz	Won	
2018	1st Valencian Audiovisual Awards	Best Production Supervision	Marifé Rueda	Won	
2018	1st Valencian Audiovisual Awards	Best Sound	Antonio Rodríguez Mármol	Nominated	
2018	1st Valencian Audiovisual Awards	Best Costume Design	Giovanna Ribes	Nominated	

== See also ==
- List of Spanish films of 2018
- List of Argentine films of 2019
