= 26th Málaga Film Festival =

2023 film festival

- Official poster by Adán Miranda
- Opening film: Someone Who Takes Care of Me
- Closing film: How to Become a Modern Man
- Location: Málaga, Spain
- Awards: Golden Biznaga (20,000 Species of Bees and Sister & Sister)
- Festival date: 10–19 March 2023

Málaga Film Festival
- 2024 2022

The 26th Málaga Film Festival took place from 10 to 19 March 2023 in Málaga, Andalusia, Spain. 20,000 Species of Bees and Sister & Sister won the Golden Biznaga for, respectively, Best Spanish Film and Best Ibero-American Film.

The festival opening gala in Teatro Cervantes on 10 March 2023 was hosted by Elena Sánchez and Marta Hazas with Raphael as special guest and Vanesa Martín, Miguel Poveda, Natalia Lacunza, and Diana Navarro as musical acts. It was followed by the screening of the opening film, Someone Who Takes Care of Me. The official selection closed with the screening of How to Become a Modern Man on 18 March 2023. The closing gala was hosted by Darío Grandinetti and Mónica Carrillo.

== Juries ==
The juries consist of the following members:

=== Official competition ===
- Manuel Gutiérrez Aragón, Spain film director
- Gonzalo Miró, Spanish television presenter
- Julieta Zylberberg, Argentine actress
- Gabriela Sandoval, Argentine festival programmer
- Pablo Stoll, Uruguayan film director

=== Zonazine ===
- María Antón Cabot, Spanish film director
- Iván Barredo, Spanish film director
- Fernando Navarro, Spanish screenwriter

== Festival slate ==
The festival slate is presented as follows:

=== Official Selection ===
==== In competition ====
Highlighted title indicates section's best film winner.

English title	Original title	Director(s)	Production countrie(s)
20,000 Species of Bees	20.000 especies de abejas	Estibaliz Urresola Solaguren	Spain
Under Therapy	Bajo terapia	Gerardo Herrero	Spain
I Woke Up With a Dream	Desperté con un sueño	Pablo Solarz	Argentina; Uruguay
The Punishment	El castigo	Matías Bize	Chile; Argentina
The Fantastic Golem Affairs	El fantástico caso del Golem	Juan González, Fernando Martínez (Burnin' Percebes)	Spain
The Enchanted	Els encantats	Elena Trapé	Spain
Let the Dance Begin	Empieza el baile	Marina Seresesky	Argentina; Spain
Girl Unknown	La desconocida	Pablo Maqueda	Spain
The Fishbowl	La pecera	Glorimar Marrero Sánchez	Puerto Rico; Spain
In the Company of Women	Las buenas compañías	Sílvia Munt	Spain; France
Sister & Sister	Las hijas	Kattia G. Zúñiga	Panama; Chile
Matria		Álvaro Gago	Spain
Rebelión		José Luis Rugeles Gracia	Colombia; Argentina; United States
Saudade fez morada aqui dentro		Haroldo Borges	Brazil
Sica		Carla Subirana	Spain
Truce(s)	Tregua(s)	Mario Hernández	Spain
Not Such an Easy Life	Una vida no tan simple	Félix Viscarret	Spain
Unicorns		Àlex Lora	Spain
Upon Entry	La llegada	Alejandro Rojas, Juan Sebastián Vásquez	Spain
Red Shoes	Zapatos rojos	Carlos Eichelmann Kaiser	Mexico

==== Out of competition ====
English title	Original title	Director(s)	Production countrie(s)
Someone Who Takes Care of Me	Alguien que cuide de mí	Daniela Fejerman, Elvira Lindo	Spain
How to Become a Modern Man	Como Dios manda	Paz Jiménez	Spain

=== Málaga Premiere ===
English title	Original title	Director(s)	Production countrie(s)
Siege	Asedio	Miguel Ángel Vivas	Spain; Mexico
Awareness		Daniel Benmayor	United States; Spain
Conversations on Hatred	Conversaciones sobre el odio	Vera Fogwill, Diego Martínez	Spain; Argentina
El hotel de los líos. García y García 2		Ana Murugarren	Spain; Italy
Esperando a Dalí		David Pujol	Spain
Friends Till Death	Amigos hasta la muerte	Javier Veiga	Spain; Mexico
Honeymoon		Enrique Otero	Spain
Kepler 6B	Kepler sexto B	Alejandro Suárez Lozano	Spain; France
Devoción		Rafa Russo	Spain
The Barbarians	La barbarie	Andrew Sala	Argentina; France
La hembrita		Laura Amelia Guzmán	Dominican Republic
Little Red Riding Wolf	De Caperucita a Loba	Chus Gutiérrez	Spain; Peru
Good Manners	Los buenos modales	Marta Díaz de Lope Díaz	Spain
Nelsito's World	El mundo de Nelsito	Fernando Pérez	Cuba; Spain
The Cuckoo's Curse	El cuco	Mar Targarona	Spain
The Monroy Affaire	El caso Monroy	Josué Méndez	Peru; Argentina
Trigal		Anabel Caso	Mexico

=== Pantalla TV ===
English title	Original title	Director(s)	Production countrie(s)
Nacho		David Pinillos	Spain
Selftape		Bàrbara Farré	Spain
When You Least Expect It	Días mejores	Alejo Flah	Spain
HIT (season 3)		Joaquín Oristrell, Samantha López Speranza, Luis Arribas	Spain
La unidad Kabul		Dani de la Torre	Spain
Las invisibles		Menna Fité	Spain
Nights in Tefía	Las noches de Tefía	Miguel del Arco	Spain
The Patients of Dr. García	Los pacientes del doctor García	Joan Noguera	Spain
Headless Chickens	Pollos sin cabeza	Adolfo Martínez, Secun de la Rosa, Rodrigo Ruiz-Gallardón	Spain

=== Zonazine ===
Highlighted title indicates section's best film winner.

English title	Original title	Director(s)	Production countrie(s)
Diógenes		Leonardo Barbuy La Torre	Peru; France; Colombia
El año que nací		Daniel González-Muniz, Alberto Amieva Leyva	Costa Rica
Julia		Hugo Martínez Fraile	Spain
La bruja de Hitler		Ernesto Ardito, Virna Molina	Argentina
The Last Night of Sandra M.	La última noche de Sandra M.	Borja de la Vega	Spain
Killing Crabs	Matar cangrejos	Omar Al Abdul Razzak	Spain; Netherlands
Sean eternxs		Raúl Perrone	Argentina
Tierra de nuestras madres		Liz Lobato	Spain

== Awards ==
Some of the main awards are presented as follows:

=== Official selection ===
Main competition

- Golden Biznaga for Best Spanish Film: 20,000 Species of Bees
- Golden Biznaga for Best Ibero-American Film: Sister & Sister
- Silver Biznaga, Special Jury Prize: Under Therapy
- Silver Biznaga for Best Director: Matías Bize (The Punishment)
- Silver Biznaga for Best Actress: María Vázquez (Matria)
- Silver Biznaga for Best Actor: Alberto Ammann (Upon Entry)
- Silver Biznaga for Best Supporting Actress: Patricia López Arnaiz (20,000 Species of Bees)
- Silver Biznaga for Best Supporting Actor: Jorge Marrale (Let the Dance Begin)
- Best Original Screenplay: Miguel Ibáñez, Elena Trapé (The Enchanted)
- Best Original Score: Pablo Mondragón (Rebelión)
- Best Cinematography: Serguei Saldívar Tanaka (Red Shoes)
- Best Editing: Haroldo Borges, Juliano Castro (Saudade fez morada aqui dentro)

Other

- Critics Award: I Woke Up With A Dream
- Audience Award: Let the Dance Begin

=== Zonazine ===
- Silver Biznaga to Best Spanish Film: Killing Crabs
- Silver Biznaga to Best Ibero-American Film: Diógenes
- Best Director: Leonardo Barbuy La Torre (Diógenes)
- Best Actress: Paula Campos (Killing Crabs)
- Best Actor: Saturnino García (Tierra de nuestras madres)
- Audience Award: Tierra de nuestras madres

=== Myscellaneous ===
- Feroz Puerta Oscura Award: 20,000 Species of Bees
- SIGNIS Award: The Punishment
