= The Cuckoo's Curse =

2023 Spanish-German film

- Film poster
- Spanish: El cuco
- Directed by: Mar Targarona
- Written by: Alfred Pérez-Fargas; Robert Danès
- Produced by: Marina Padró; Joaquín Padró; Wolfgang Mueller; Benito Mueller; Mar Targarona
- Starring: Belén Cuesta; Rainer Reiners; Jorge Suquet; Hildegard Schroedter
- Cinematography: Rafa Lluch
- Edited by: José Luis Romeu
- Music by: Diego Navarro
- Production companies: Rodar y Rodar; El Pájaro Cuco AIE; Barry Films
- Distributed by: Filmax (es)
- Release dates: 17 March 2023 (Málaga); 15 September 2023 (Spain)
- Countries: Spain; Germany
- Languages: Spanish; German

The Cuckoo's Curse (Spanish: El cuco) is a 2023 supernatural thriller film directed by Mar Targarona from a screenplay by Alfred Pérez-Fargas and Robert Danès, and starring Belén Cuesta, Rainer Reiners, Jorge Suquet, and Hildegard Schroedter. It was internationally co-produced by Spain and Germany.

The plot revolves around a swap of houses between a Spanish couple (Cuesta and Suquet) waiting for their first child and a couple of old-age Germans (Schroedter and Reiners).

The Cuckoo's Curse premiered at 26th Málaga Film Festival on 17 March 2023 and was released theatrically in Spain by Filmax on 15 September 2023.

== Plot ==
A young white-collar Spanish couple (architect Marc and obstetrician Anna) arrange to swap houses with a couple of likeable older Germans (Hans and Olga) from Freiburg, so that they could go on vacation to Schwarzwald for several days before the expected birth of their first baby.

On arrival in Germany, Marc receives from Hans an indication of possible liaison still ongoing between Anna and their neighbour back in Spain (with whom Anna had an affair previously), which makes him doubt his own paternity of their baby. In a distressed state he crashes Hans's Maserati GT and sprains his leg, announcing to Anna taciturnly that he will be returning to Spain the next day. Next morning however he mysteriously forgets about his intention and is in a surprisingly upbeat and cheerful mood.

Anna discovers a strange middle-aged woman trying to run water taps for bath in Hans and Olga's house who, on noticing Anna's pregnancy, warns her that she should leave the house immediately or she will be "next" (Anna does not understand the woman's warning because she does not speak German). According to the called police patrol who hand her over to ambulance service, the woman is a dangerous escapee from a psychiatric hospital who suffers from Capgras syndrome. Later that evening when Marc and Anna go to Fastnacht carnival, Anna experiences a sudden vertigo and comes to only later in the night at home, without recollection of the intervening events. With surprise she discovers that on his back Marc has a tattoo in the shape of Fehu rune ⟨ᚠ⟩ - Marc states that such a tattoo is called "Freyja" (Note: In Norse mythology, Freyja (also spelled Freya) is a goddess associated with fertility, love, beauty and sex; Runic letter 'ᚠ' is one of the objects associated with her, to some extent due to her name starting with that rune (corresponding letter of Gothic alphabet is '𐍆').) and it stands for rebirth. Meanwhile, back in Marc and Anna's Spanish apartment, Hans and Olga spend all their time wearing loose robes and reciting incantations incessantly. At the same time when Anna regains her consciousness after the carnival, Olga ritually kills Hans by stabbing him in the throat.

Anna receives the news from Spain that behaviour of their German guests in the temporarily swapped apartment has been extremely unusual. With even greater astonishment she also finds the same runic tattoo on her shoulder as Marc has, which Marc claims they both got last night to symbolise renewal. Marc's demeanour also changes markedly, he becomes very orderly and meticulous, and he begins to communicate in German (which he did not know previously). Anna breaks through the wall into a secret room in the house, where she finds two photographs showing Olga and Hans, with each of them having differing heights between two photos - and in one picture she recognises the strange woman who warned her earlier about being "next". Anna attempts to flee to the airport in a taxi but is stopped by Marc, who then appears to proceed to drown her in bathtub. On recovering consciousness, she is no longer antagonistic to Marc - and just like Marc, she also starts communicating preferentially in German.

In the Spanish apartment, Olga's mind returns to normal functionality when she tries to drown herself in bathtub. Marc and Anna return from Germany, Olga succeeds in trapping Marc in the cellar and then induces in Anna accelerated childbirth with oxytocin (ignoring Anna's offer to return her body in exchange for the baby's blood), delivering the new-born baby with utmost care and wrapping it with deep love. In a subsequent scuffle with Marc she stabs him fatally with scissors. Anna attacks her from behind, but Olga retaliates with a blood-gushing blow into Anna's face with a blender, saying to herself (in Spanish) "I never liked my nose." She wraps the baby up gently again and tells it tenderly "I love you," prior to leaving the apartment, just a few seconds before the police arrive.

== Cast ==
- Belén Cuesta as Anna
- Rainer Reiners as Hans
- Jorge Suquet as Marc
- Hildegard Schroedter as Olga
- Chacha Huang
- Manuel Dueso as Serafín
- David Selvas as Lucas
- Marina Gatell as Mónica

== Production ==
The screenplay was penned by Alfred Pérez-Fargas and Robert Danès.

The film is a Spanish-German international co-production by Rodar y Rodar Cine, El Pájaro Cuco AIE and Barry Films, with participation of RTVE, Orange and Crea SGR; and with funding from ICAA and ICEC.

== Release ==
The Cuckoo's Curse premiered in the 'Málaga Premiere' section of the 26th Málaga Film Festival on 17 March 2023. It also made it to the International Competition slate of the 22nd Neuchâtel International Fantastic Film Festival.

Distributed by Filmax, the film was released in Spanish cinemas on 15 September 2023.

== Reception ==
Víctor A. Gómez of La Opinión de Málaga, wrote that Targarona delivers "a spectacle with no direction and sense other than that of absolute disaster".

Toni Vall of Cinemanía rated the film 2 out of 5 stars, writing about "one of the most unequal casts imaginable", with Cuesta separated by a huge distance from the rest.

María Bescós of HobbyConsolas rated the film with 56 points (i.e. 'so-so'), positively citing its ability to "generate intrigue and tension" while negatively citing its tonal change as the film gets close to its denouement.

Juan Pando of Fotogramas deemed the film to be "a visually elegant supernatural thriller with suspense that avoids gratuitous scares".

== See also ==
- List of Spanish films of 2023
