= Known Strangers =

- Directed by: Manolo González
- Written by: Manolo González; Guillermo Santana
- Produced by: Luis Ángel Bellaba; Oscar Marcos Azar; Oliver Thau; Jan Bonath; Dorota Budna
- Starring: Elena Ballesteros; Chiqui Fernández; Alberto Jiménez; Jean Pierre Noher; Michel Noher; Mariano Peña; Isabel Prinz; Adam Quintero; Nasser Saleh; Manuel Tallafé; Jordi Vilches
- Cinematography: Helmut Fischer
- Edited by: Ivo Fuchs
- Music by: Luis Elices; Francisco Musulén
- Release date: October 10, 2010
- Running time: 94 minutes
- Countries: Spain; Germany; Argentina
- Language: Spanish

Known Strangers is a Spanish-German-Argentine omnibus film directed by Spanish helmer Manolo González. Filmed from a screenplay by Manolo González and Guillermo Santana. The movie traces the actions of fourteen principal characters, both in parallel and occasionally connected by a radio program that everybody is following. The role of chance and luck is central to the film, and many of the stories concern violence and infidelity.

== Plot ==
The film begins with in a seemingly innocuous radio talk show. One caller confesses his necrophilia tendencies, which was used by a co-worker in order to blackmail him. A student wants to finally try and abandon her job as a call girl which finances her education and a gang of youngsters decide to do something about the violent husband of a neighbour, while a young writer is searching for a woman, who will mysteriously save his live in the end. These stories are woven together with bits and pieces from the radio show “known strangers”, a programme followed by a big and loyal audience of people who can’t sleep at night.

== Production ==
Filming primarily took place in Madrid, Spain and Buenos Aires, Argentine. Principal photography began on July 4, 2009 in Buenos Aires, and ended on October 20, 2009 in Madrid.

== Accolades ==
Manolo González was nominated for the Golden Biznaga at the Malaga Spanish Film Festival in 2010. The film also won the prestigious audience award at the Festival de Cine de Léon.
