= Love & Mathematics =

Amor y matemáticas
- Theatrical release poster
- Directed by: Claudia Sainte-Luce
- Written by: Adriana Pelusi
- Produced by: Renato Betancourt; Christian Kregel; Erick Peña; Adán Pérez; Lesslye Yin
- Starring: Roberto Quijano
- Cinematography: Carlos Correa
- Edited by: Julián Felipe Sarmiento López
- Music by: Dan Zlotnik
- Production company: Jaqueca Films
- Release date: 10 September 2022 (TIFF)
- Running time: 85 minutes
- Country: Mexico
- Language: Spanish

Love & Mathematics (Spanish: Amor y matemáticas) is a 2022 Mexican comedy film directed by Claudia Sainte-Luce and written by Adriana Pelusi. Starring Roberto Quijano. It had its international premiere on September 10, 2022, at the Toronto International Film Festival in the Contemporary World Cinema section.

== Synopsis ==
Billy is a singer who was very successful in the past, he is currently married with a son, but he feels frustrated and immersed in a routine, until the arrival of an old fan.

== Cast ==
The actors participating in this film are:

- Roberto Quijano as Billy
- Diana Bovio as Mónica
- Marco Alfonso Polo as Guerra
- Homero Guerra

== Release ==
It had its international premiere on September 10, 2022, at the Toronto International Film Festival, then it screened on November 6, 2022, at the Havana Film Festival, New York, on March 10, 2023, at the 30th San Diego Latino Film Festival, on April 13, 2023, at the 39th Chicago Latino Film Festival (opening film), on April 15, 2023 at the San Francisco International Film Festival and on June 3, 2023 at the 38th Guadalajara International Film Festival.

== Accolades ==
Year	Award	Category	Recipient	Result	Ref.
2022	Havana Film Festival New York	Best Actor	Roberto Quijano	Won	
2023	Göteborg Film Festival	Best International Film	Love & Mathematics	Nominated	
2023	San Francisco International Film Festival	Cine Latino Jury Award	Love & Mathematics	Nominated	
2023	Guadalajara International Film Festival	Mezcal Award - Best Film	Love & Mathematics	Nominated	
