= Under Therapy =

- Theatrical release poster
- Spanish: Bajo terapia
- Directed by: Gerardo Herrero
- Based on: Bajo terapia by Matías del Federico
- Produced by: Miguel Iturralde
- Starring: Malena Alterio; Alexandra Jiménez; Fele Martínez; Antonio Pagudo; Eva Ugarte; Juan Carlos Vellido
- Cinematography: Juan Carlos Gómez
- Edited by: Clara Martínez Malagelada
- Music by: Paula Olaz
- Production companies: Alcaraván Films; Tornasol
- Distributed by: Syldavia Cinema
- Release dates: 12 March 2023 (Málaga); 17 March 2023 (Spain)
- Country: Spain
- Language: Spanish

Under Therapy (Spanish: Bajo terapia) is a 2023 Spanish comedy film directed by Gerardo Herrero based on the stage play by Matías del Federico. It stars Malena Alterio, Alexandra Jiménez, Fele Martínez, Antonio Pagudo, Eva Ugarte, and Juan Carlos Vellido.

== Plot ==
The plot follows three troubled couples convened by a psychologist, who provides them with a set of instructions for their therapy instead of attending to the session.

== Cast ==
- Malena Alterio as Marta
- Alexandra Jiménez as Laura
- Fele Martínez as Daniel
- Antonio Pagudo as Esteban
- Eva Ugarte as Carla
- Juan Carlos Vellido as Roberto

== Production ==
The film is a Tornasol and Alcaraván Films production, and it had the participation of Movistar Plus+ and backing from Gobierno de Navarra. It was fully shot at Pamplona's La Casa de las Gomas and its surroundings.

== Release ==
The film was presented at the 26th Málaga Film Festival on 12 March 2023. Distributed by Syldavia Cinema, it was released theatrically in Spain on 17 March 2023.

== Reception ==
Raquel Hernández Luján of HobbyConsolas rated the film with 65 points ('acceptable') highlighting the planning behind the filming as well as "the way in which the atmosphere becomes increasingly oppressive and claustrophobic" as the best things about it.

Nuria Vidal of Cinemanía rated the film 3½ out of 5 stars, underscoring it to be an "intelligent approach to a highly topical subject".

== Accolades ==
| Year | Award | Category | Nominee(s) | Result | Ref. |
|---|---|---|---|---|---|
| 2023 | 26th Málaga Film Festival | Special Jury Prize | | Won | |
| 2024 | 38th Goya Awards | Best Supporting Actor | Juan Carlos Vellido | Nominated | |
| 2024 | 11th Platino Awards | Best Ibero-American Comedy Film | | Won | |

== See also ==
- List of Spanish films of 2023
