= Juli Mira =

Spanish actor (1949)

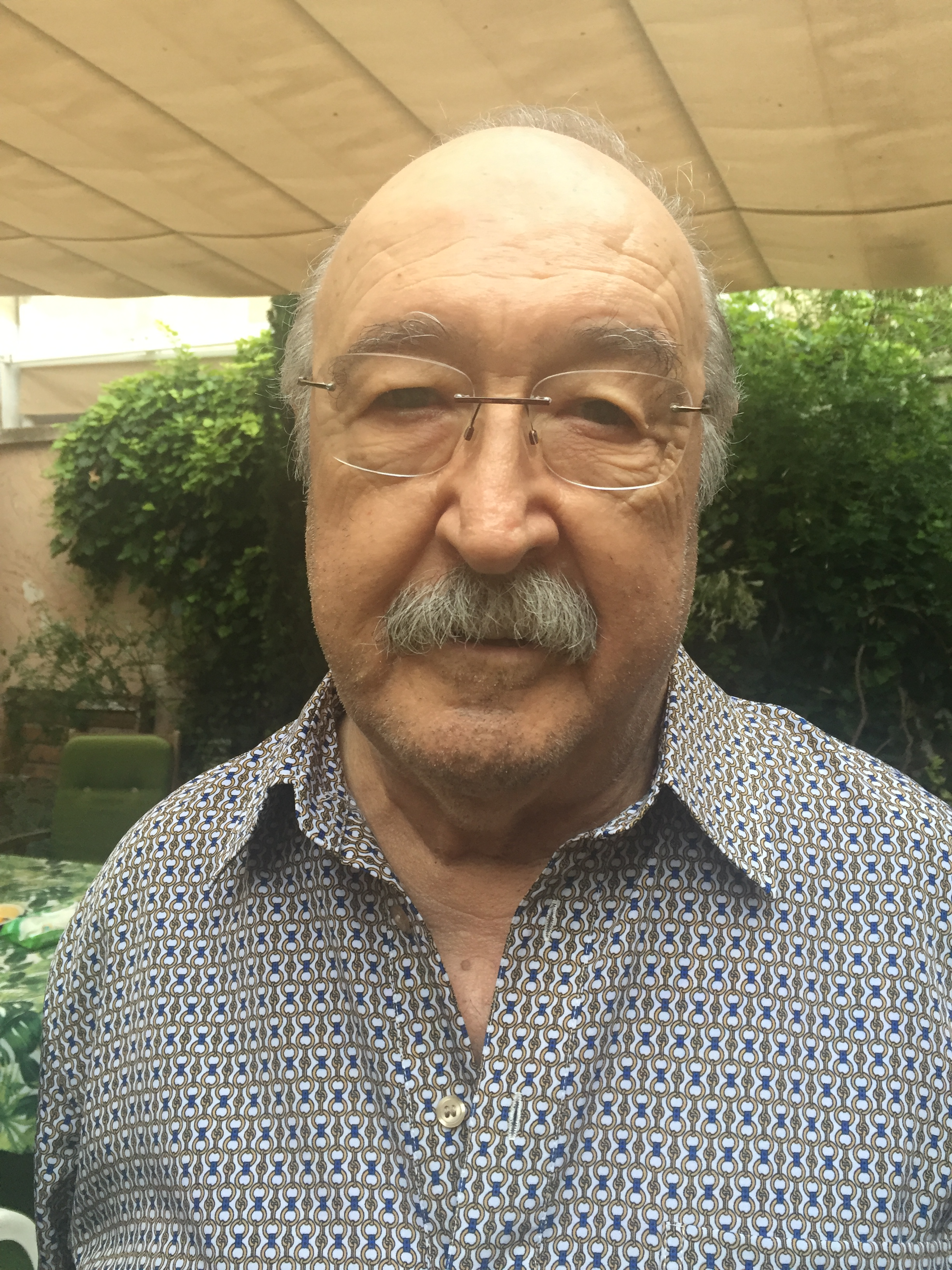
Mira in 2020

Juli Mira (2 May 1949) was a Spanish actor. He appeared in more than eighty films from 1978.

== Selected filmography ==
Year	Title	Role	Notes
1998	Mararía	Sebastián	
2000	The Sea	Don Eugeni	
2003	Voices in the Night	Padre	
2007	Crazy	Ramón	
2009	El cónsul de Sodoma	Don Luis	
2023	Kepler 6B	Raimundo	
