= Someone Who Takes Care of Me =

- Film poster
- Spanish: Alguien que cuide de mí
- Directed by: Daniela Fejerman; Elvira Lindo
- Screenplay by: Elvira Lindo; Daniela Fejerman
- Produced by: Gerardo Herrero
- Starring: Aura Garrido; Emma Suárez; Magüi Mira; Pedro Mari Sánchez; Francesc Garrido; Víctor Clavijo; María Isabel Díaz Lago; Carlos Olalla
- Cinematography: Juan Carlos Gómez
- Edited by: Irene Blecua
- Music by: Paula Olaz
- Production companies: Tornasol Media; Lo que nunca te dije AIE
- Distributed by: A Contracorriente Films
- Release dates: 10 March 2023 (Málaga); 28 April 2023 (Spain)
- Country: Spain
- Language: Spanish

Someone Who Takes Care of Me (Spanish: Alguien que cuide de mí) is a 2023 Spanish comedy-drama film directed and written by Daniela Fejerman and Elvira Lindo which stars Aura Garrido and Emma Suárez.

== Plot ==
Set in Madrid, the plot follows the fraught relation between three generations of thespians: Nora, her mother Cecilia, and her grandmother Magüi, underscored by a big secret withheld by Cecilia from Nora.

== Cast ==
- Aura Garrido as Nora
- Emma Suárez as Cecilia
- Magüi Mira as Magüi
- Pedro Mari Sánchez
- Francesc Garrido
- Víctor Clavijo
- María Isabel Díaz Lago
- Carlos Olalla

== Production ==
The film is based on an original story by Elvira Lindo tentatively titled Lo que nunca te dije. It was produced by Tornasol Media and Lo que nunca te dije AIE, with the participation of RTVE, and Movistar Plus+, help from the Government of Navarre and support from ICAA. It was shot from April to May 2022 primarily in Pamplona, Navarre.

== Release ==
Alguien que cuide de mí premiered as the opening film of the 26th Málaga Film Festival's official selection (out of competition) on 10 March 2023. Distributed by A Contracorriente Films, it was released theatrically in Spain on 28 April 2023.

== Accolades ==
Year	Award	Category	Nominee(s)	Result	Ref.
2024	32nd Actors and Actresses Union Awards	Best Film Actor in a Minor Role	Víctor Clavijo	Won	

== See also ==
- List of Spanish films of 2023
