= Sister & Sister =

2023 film by Kattia González

- Theatrical release poster
- Spanish: Las hijas
- Directed by: Kattia González
- Written by: Kattia González
- Produced by: Alejo Crisóstomo; Isabella Gálvez; Said Isaac; Kattia González
- Starring: Ariana Chaves Gavilán; Cala Rossel Campos
- Cinematography: Alejo Crisóstomo
- Edited by: Andrea Chignoli
- Music by: Michelle Blades
- Production companies: Ceibita Films; Mente Pública
- Release dates: 11 March 2023 (SXSW); 31 August 2023 (Panama)
- Running time: 80 minutes
- Countries: Panama; Chile
- Language: Spanish

Sister & Sister (Spanish: Las hijas, lit. 'The daughters') is a 2023 drama film written, directed and co-produced by Kattia González in her directorial debut. An international co-production between Panama and Chile, the film stars Ariana Chaves Gavilán and Cala Rossel Campos as two Costa Rican teenage sisters who travel to Panama to look for their absent father.

== Synopsis ==
Two sisters, Marina and Luna, travel from Costa Rica to Panama to search for their absent father. Along the way they will find a space to explore their desires, make new friends, have lovers and practice skateboarding, on a journey towards emancipation in which they will learn the virtue of just hanging out.

== Cast ==
The actors participating in this film are:

- Ariana Chaves Gavilán as Luna
- Cala Rossel Campos as Marina
- Fernando Bonilla
- Joshua De León
- Milagros Fernández
- Lía Jiménez
- Gabriela Man
- Angello Morales
- Michelle Quiñones
- Lurys Rivera
- Mir Rodriguez
- Seuxis Sánchez

== Production ==
Principal photography was scheduled to start in 2020, but was delayed due to the COVID-19 pandemic. Filming began in May 2021 in Panama City, Panama International Maritime University and Paso Canoa, Chiriquí.

== Release ==
Sister & Sister had its world premiere on 11 March 2023 at the South by Southwest, then screened on 16 March 2023 at the 26th Málaga Film Festival, on 27 March 2023 at the Latino Film Festival in Toulouse, on 16 May 2023 at the 49th Seattle International Film Festival, on 5 June 2023 at the 38th Guadalajara International Film Festival, on 23 June 2023 at the 25th Taipei Film Festival, on 13 July 2023 at the 25th Galway Film Fleadh, on 11 August 2023 at the 27th Lima Film Festival and on 21 August 2023 at the 19th Santiago International Film Festival.

The film was released theatricall in Panama on 31 August 2023.

== Reception ==
=== Critical response ===
On the review aggregator website Rotten Tomatoes, 100% of 8 critics' reviews are positive, with an average rating of 7.5/10.

=== Accolades ===
Year	Award / Festival	Category	Recipient	Result	Ref.
2023	Málaga Film Festival	Best Ibero-American Film	Sister & Sister	Won	
2023	Seattle International Film Festival	Ibero-American Competition - Grand Jury Prize	Sister & Sister	Nominated	
2023	Guadalajara International Film Festival	Ibero-American Fiction Feature Film - Best Film	Sister & Sister	Nominated	
2023	Taipei Film Festival	New Talent Competition - Grand Prix	Sister & Sister	Nominated	
2023	Lima Film Festival	Best Picture	Sister & Sister	Nominated	
2023	Santiago International Film Festival	Chilean Film Competition - Best Picture	Sister & Sister	Won	
2023	Santiago International Film Festival	Best Performance	Ariana Chaves Gavilán	Won (Note: Tied with History and Geography)	
