= Lola Gaos Awards =

- Type: Film, television and videogame awards
- Location: Valencian Community, Spain
- Presented by: Acadèmia Valenciana de l'Audiovisual (AVAV)
- First award: 2018
- Website: https://academiavalencianadelaudiovisual.com/va/

The Lola Gaos Awards, formerly Berlanga Awards (Valencian: Premis Berlanga; Spanish: Premios Berlanga) and originally Valencian Audiovisual Awards (Premis de l'Audiovisual Valencià), are the main film awards of the Valencian Community, Spain, presented by the Acadèmia Valenciana de l'Audiovisual (AVAV), and celebrated annually.

== History ==
Originally promoted by the regional ministry of Culture, the awards were first presented in 2018 by the Institut Valencià de Cultura ('Valencian Institute of Culture'; IVC) and the Acadèmia Valenciana de l'Audiovisual ('Valencian Audiovisual Academy'; AVAV). The trophies originally consisted of an abstract sculpture blending stone and methacrylate designed by local artist Inma Femenía. The ceremony was broadcast on the regional broadcaster À Punt. New categories were introduced in the 2nd edition, broadening the scope of the awards to television series, web series and videogames, up to a total of 23 categories overall. In 2021, on the occasion of the one hundred anniversary of the birth of Luis García Berlanga, the regional ministry of Education, Culture and Sport agreed on the renaming of the awards to Berlanga Awards (Premis Berlanga) from the 4th edition onward to pay homage to the Valencia-born filmmaker. The Empreses Audiovisuals Valencianes Federades (EAVF), which had already registered the name of Premios Berlanga in 2008, ceded the naming rights.

In 2024, partnership with the Institut Valencià de Cultura (IVC) was severed as the IVC refused to back up the gala. EAVF decided to annul the informal agreement with the academy to lease the brand name of Berlanga, the academy determined that the awards would be known as Lola Gaos Awards, after actress Lola Gaos. Despite the Valencian government's withdrawal of support to the awards, academy president Teresa Cebrián stated that the awards would continue to be held, and that the upcoming edition would be re-scheduled from late 2024 to early 2025. As the design of the trophies was previously licensed by the IVC, it had to be revamped for the 2025 edition, with a new design by Kike Correcher. Likewise, the Valencian regional pubcaster À Punt Media reportedly refused to broadcast the 2025 gala.

== List of ceremonies ==
Edition	Ceremony Date	Venue	Host	Best Film	Broadcast	Ref.
1st	16 November 2018	Teatro Principal, Alicante	Maria Juan	The Uncovering	À Punt	
2nd	22 November 2019	Auditori, Castellón	Maria Juan	Live Twice, Love Once	À Punt	
3rd	22 November 2020	Palau de les Arts, Valencia	Núria Roca	La mort de Guillem	À Punt	
4th	4 December 2021	Teatro Principal, Alicante	Pere Aznar	The Sacred Spirit	À Punt	
5th	12 November 2022	Auditori, Castelló	Maria Juan	Vasil	À Punt	
6th	11 November 2023	Palau de les Arts, Valencia	Mireia Pérez	Kepler 6B	À Punt	
7th	1 February 2025	Palau de la Música, Valencia	Inma Sancho	La casa	—N/a	
8th	14 November 2025	Auditorio de la Diputación, Alicante	Inma Sancho	The Portuguese House	À Punt	
9th	5 December 2026	Palau de la Música, Valencia	TBD	TBD	TBD	

== See also ==
- Carmen Awards
- Gaudí Awards
- Mestre Mateo Awards
