= Kepler 6B (film) =

- Theatrical release poster
- Spanish: Kepler Sexto B
- Directed by: Alejandro Suárez Lozano
- Screenplay by: Alejandro Suárez Lozano; Grete Lee-Man Suárez
- Produced by: Lina Badenes; Gonzalo de Santiago
- Starring: Karra Elejalde; Daniela Pezzotti; Jorge Bosch; Pablo Molinero; Juli Mira; Ramiro Blas
- Cinematography: Pablo Bürmann
- Edited by: Perig Guinamant
- Music by: Vanessa Garde
- Production companies: Turanga Films; Pincheforn Producciones; Kepler-Sexto B AIE; Quexito Films; Noodles Production
- Distributed by: Filmax
- Release dates: 13 March 2023 (Málaga); 16 June 2023 (Spain)
- Countries: Spain; France
- Language: Spanish

Kepler 6B (Spanish: Kepler Sexto B) is a 2023 Spanish-French drama film directed by Alejandro Suárez Lozano (in his directorial feature length debut) which stars Karra Elejalde and Daniela Pezzotti.

== Plot ==
The plot follows upon the meeting of Zai (a girl suffering from abuse from her stepfather) and Jonás (an isolated old man who has come to believe that he is an astronaut living in a starship moored in a far away planet).

== Cast ==
- Karra Elejalde as Jonás
- Daniela Pezzotti as Zai
- Jorge Bosch as Paco
- Vicente Vergara as Manolo
- Mariana Cordero as Mariana
- Pablo Molinero as Pedro
- Juli Mira as Raimundo
- Amina Leony as Zulema
- Jacqueline Corado as Dolores
- Pep Ricart as Faustino
- Ramiro Blas as jefe de policía
- Jaime Rodríguez as Súper

== Production ==
The film was produced by Turanga Films, Pincheforn Producciones and Kepler Sexto B AIE alongside Quexito Films and Noodles Production, with backing from ICAA and IVC and participation of TVE, À Punt Mèdia, Crea SGR and ICO. It was shot in locations of the Valencia region, including Castellón, La Vall d'Uixó, Valencia, and Torrent.

== Release ==
The film premiered at the 26th Málaga Film Festival on 13 March 2023. Distributed by Filmax, it was released theatrically in Spain on 16 June 2023.

== Reception ==
Sergio F. Pinilla of Cinemanía rated the film 3½ out of 5 stars, underscoring it to be an "intergenerational and cosmic fable with Karra [Elejalde] showcasing his talents".

Juan Pando of Fotogramas rated the film 3 out of 5 stars, positively pointing out at the unusual character of the proposal, while pointing out at some characters being "pure stereotypes" as a negative point.

Ekaitz Ortega of HobbyConsolas rated the film with 65 points ('acceptable'), singling out the two leads as well as the narration of the tension between reality and imagination as the best things about the film.

== Accolades ==
Year	Award	Category	Nominee(s)	Result	Ref.
2023	6th Berlanga Awards	Best Film		Won	
2023	6th Berlanga Awards	Best Director	Alejandro Suárez	Nominated	
2023	6th Berlanga Awards	Best Screenplay	Alejandro Suárez, Grete Lee-Man Suárez	Won	
2023	6th Berlanga Awards	Best Actor	Karra Elejalde	Won	
2023	6th Berlanga Awards	Best Supporting Actor	Juli Mira	Nominated	
2023	6th Berlanga Awards	Best Supporting Actor	Pablo Molinero	Won	
2023	6th Berlanga Awards	Best Editing and Post-Production	Carmen García, Audrey Bourdiol	Nominated	
2023	6th Berlanga Awards	Best Cinematography and Lighting	Pablo Bürmann	Won	
2023	6th Berlanga Awards	Best Art Direction	Maje Tarazona	Won	
2023	6th Berlanga Awards	Best Production Supervision	Cristian Guijarro	Nominated	
2023	6th Berlanga Awards	Best Costume Design	Raquel Porter	Nominated	
2023	6th Berlanga Awards	Best Makeup and Hairstyles	Amparo Sánchez, Ane Martínez	Nominated	
2023	6th Berlanga Awards	Best Sound	Nicolás Mas	Nominated	
2023	6th Berlanga Awards	Best Original Score	Vanessa Garde	Won	
2023	6th Berlanga Awards	Youth Award		Won	

== See also ==
- List of Spanish films of 2023
