= Crazy (2007 Spanish film) =

- Film poster
- Spanish: Enloquecidas
- Directed by: Juan Luis Iborra
- Screenplay by: Juan Luis Iborra; Antonio Albert
- Starring: Silvia Abascal; Verónica Forqué; Concha Velasco; Jordi Rebellón; Asunción Balaguer; Juli Mira; Iván Sánchez; Elisa Matilla
- Cinematography: José Manchado
- Music by: José Reinoso
- Production companies: El Paso PC; Cuarteto PC; Hispanocine PC; Notro Films
- Release dates: December 2007 (L'Alfàs del Pi); 9 April 2008 (Málaga); 11 April 2008 (Spain)
- Country: Spain
- Language: Spanish

Crazy (Spanish: Enloquecidas) is a 2007 Spanish comedy film directed by Juan Luis Iborra which stars Silvia Abascal, Verónica Forqué, and Concha Velasco alongside Jordi Rebellón, Asunción Balaguer, Juli Mira, Iván Sánchez, and Elisa Matilla.

== Plot ==
Blanca has met the man of her life, but he has mysteriously vanished. She embarks in a crazy investigation across the city (a Madrid whose streets are always under construction), teaming up with her aunt Bárbara (married to a municipal councillor responsible for Urbanism) and a fed-up actress (Nuria).

== Cast ==
- Silvia Abascal as Blanca
- Verónica Forqué as Bárbara
- Concha Velasco as Nuria
- Jordi Rebellón as José María
- Asunción Balaguer as Carmen
- Juli Mira as Ramón
- Iván Sánchez as Daniel
- Elisa Matilla as Andrea
- Jesús Cabrero as Santiago
- Juana Cordero as Conchita
- Javier Blanes as Javier
- Merche Suance as madre de Javier

== Production ==
The screenplay was penned by Juan Luis Iborra alongside Antonio Albert. The film is an El Paso PC, Cuarteto PC, Hispanocine PC and Notro Films production. Joaquín Manchado was responsible for the cinematography and José Reinoso for the score. Shooting took place in Madrid, beginning on 19 March and wrapping on 20 June 2007.

== Release ==
The film received a pre-screening in December 2007 in L'Alfàs del Pi. It was presented at the Málaga Film Festival's official selection on 9 April 2008. It was theatrically released in Spain on 11 April 2008.

== Reception ==
Francisco Griñán of Diario Sur assessed that insofar the film aims to entertain it manages to do so sometimes, also adding that the light (yet also "bland") comedy based on the comedy talent of Abascal and Forqué (great in a tailor-made role) sometimes features scenes that are taken to such an extreme that they do not hold up.

Jonathan Holland of Variety wrote that "in spite of a few moments of authentic wit and a lively perf from Veronica Forque in a role tailored for her, little elevates this above any number of other well-honed farces".

== Accolades ==
Year	Award	Category	Nominee(s)	Result	Ref.
2008	11th Málaga Film Festival	Best Costume Design	Pepe Reyes	Won	

== See also ==
- List of Spanish films of 2008
