= In the Company of Women =

- Theatrical release poster
- Spanish: Las buenas compañías
- Directed by: Sílvia Munt
- Screenplay by: Jorge Gil Munarriz; Sílvia Munt
- Produced by: Ander Sagardoy; Antonio Chavarrías; Xabier Berzosa; Fernando Larrondo; Mónica Lozano
- Starring: Alícia Falcó; Itziar Ituño; Elena Tarrats
- Cinematography: Gorka Gómez
- Music by: Paula Olaz
- Production companies: Irusoin; Oberon Media; En la Frontera Película AIE; Manny Films; La Fidèle Production
- Distributed by: Filmax (es)
- Release dates: 13 March 2023 (Málaga); 5 May 2023 (Spain)
- Countries: Spain; France
- Language: Spanish

In the Company of Women (Spanish: Las buenas compañías) is a 2023 Spanish-French drama film directed by Sílvia Munt which stars Alícia Falcó, Itziar Ituño, and Elena Tarrats. Inspired by the case of the Basauri 11, the plot, set in the Basque town of Errenteria against the backdrop of the so-called Spanish Transition, explores the plight of women clandestinely helping other women to terminate their pregnancy.

== Plot ==
In the Summer of 1977, Bea involves with a group of activists supporting women rights and the right to abortion in the Basque town of Errenteria, while also falling for an older well-off girl, Miren.

== Cast ==
- Alícia Falcó as Bea
- Elena Tarrats as Miren
- Itziar Ituño as Feli
- Ainhoa Santamaría as Belén
- María Cerezuela as Toto
- Nagore Cenizo as Asun
- Iván Massagué as Rafa
- Heren de Lucas as Maite
- Sara Barroeta as Pili

== Production ==
The screenplay was penned Munt alongside Jorge Gil Munarriz. The film is a Spanish-French co-production by Irusoin, Oberon Media, En la Frontera Película, Manny Films, La Fidèle Production, with the participation of EiTB, TV3, and RTVE, and support of ICAA, ICEC, and the Basque Government. Shooting locations included Errenteria, Pasaia, San Sebastián, and Biarritz.

== Release ==
The film was presented in the official selection of the 26th Málaga Film Festival on 13 March 2023. Distributed by Filmax, it was released theatrically in Spain on 5 May 2023.

== Reception ==
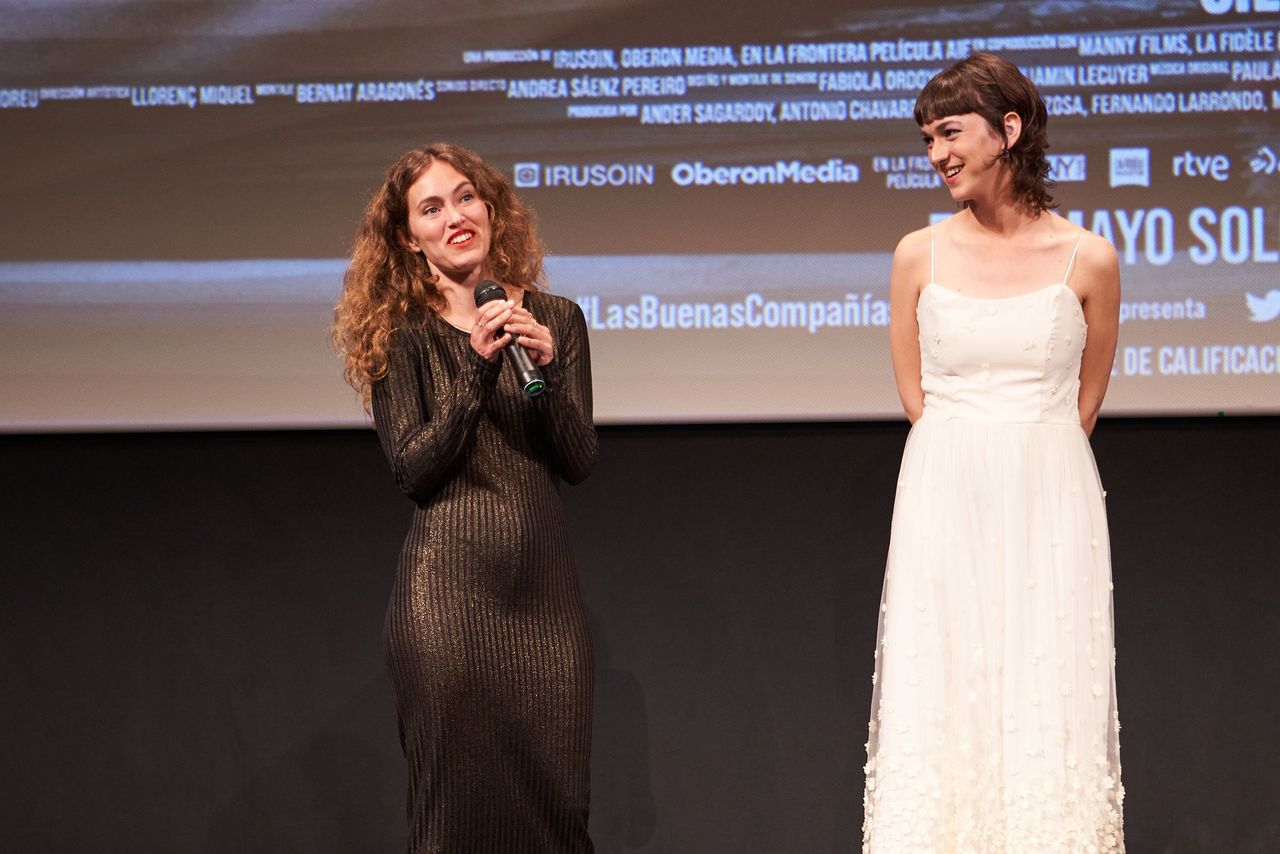
Tarrats and Falcó during the presentation of the film at the San Sebastian Human Rights Film Festival in April 2023.

Matías G. Rebolledo of La Razón considered Las bueñas compañías, ultimately a film about insolence, to be "didactic but not instructive, empathetic but not sentimentalist, realistic but not historicist".

Víctor A. Gómez of La Opinión de Málaga assessed that Falcó's central presence dwarves and renders inane the rest of performances, efforts from Munt notwithstanding.

Jonathan Holland of ScreenDaily wrote that the film brings a "fresh female perspective" which, "despite its tragic undertow, is best seen as a celebration of those heady, transformative times [the 1970s] and a reminder of what solidarity can achieve".

== Accolades ==
Year	Award	Category	Nominee(s)	Result	Ref.
2024	16th Gaudí Awards	Best New Performance	Alícia Falcó	Nominated	

== See also ==
- List of Spanish films of 2023
