= Let the Dance Begin (film) =

- Theatrical release poster
- Spanish: Empieza el baile
- Directed by: Marina Seresesky
- Screenplay by: Marina Seresesky
- Starring: Darío Grandinetti; Mercedes Morán; Jorge Marrale
- Cinematography: Federico Rivarés
- Edited by: Irene Blecua
- Music by: Nicolás Guerschberg
- Production companies: Meridional Producciones; Oeste Films; Patagonik Film Group; El Gatoverde Producciones; Áralan Films; Empieza el baile película AIE; Habitación 1520 Producciones; Sur Films; Reina de Pike Producciones
- Distributed by: Me lo Creo (es); Star Distribution (ar)
- Release dates: 14 March 2023 (Málaga); 5 April 2023 (Spain); 20 April 2023 (Argentina)
- Countries: Argentina; Spain
- Language: Spanish

Let the Dance Begin (Spanish: Empieza el baile) is a 2023 Argentine-Spanish road comedy-drama film directed by Marina Seresesky which stars Darío Grandinetti and Mercedes Morán alongside Jorge Marrale.

== Plot ==
Margarita elaborates a ruse feigning her death so she has her former tango partner Carlos returned from Spain (where the latter has formed a family) to Argentina forty years later, thereby initiating a journey across Argentina together, jointly with a shared acquaintance.

== Cast ==
- Darío Grandinetti as Carlos
- Mercedes Morán as Margarita
- Jorge Marrale as Pichuquito
- Pastora Vega as Elvira
- Agostina Pozzi
- Lautaro Zera
- Marcelo Xicarts
- Carolina Sobisch

== Production ==
The film is an Argentine-Spanish co-production by Meridional Producciones, Oeste Films, Patagonik Film Group, El Gatoverde Producciones, Áralan Films, Empiza el baile película AIE; Habitación 1520 Producciones, Sur Films, and Reina de Pike Producciones. It also had the participation of RTVE, and the collaboration of the Madrid regional administration, Ayuntamiento de Madrid, Ibermedia, INCAA, the Government of Mendoza, Consejo General de Inversiones Argentina and Bodega Santa Julia.

== Release ==
The film was presented in the official selection of the 26th Málaga Film Festival on 14 March 2023. Distributed by Me lo Creo, it was released theatrically in Spain on 5 April 2023. Distributed by Star Distribution, the film was scheduled to open in Argentine theatres on 20 April 2023.

== Reception ==
Andrea G. Bermejo of Cinemanía rated the film 4 out of 5 stars, assessing "Grandinetti, Morán and Marrale, [to be] a trio of unforgettable actors".

Elsa Fernández-Santos of El País deemed the film to be a "journey of return full of humor and pain thanks to a well-spun story through three wonderful performers".

Nando Salvà of El Periódico de Catalunya rated the film 3 out of 5 stars, pointing out that the efficiency of its sense of humor is based on the "overwhelming performances of three perfectly balanced and synchronized actors".

Manuel J. Lombardo of Diario de Sevilla rated the film 3 out of 5 stars, pointing out that despite "fully assuming certain Argentine stereotypes", the film manages to achieve, "above all thanks to its three great performers", just the right tone of bittersweet and melancholic comedy.

Guillermo Courau of La Nación rated the film 3 out of 5 stars ('good'), describing it as a "film as tender as it is bitter, not without touches of black humor helping to soften its taciturn essence", which stands out for the performances from the leading trio.

== Accolades ==
| Year | Award | Category | Nominee(s) | Result | Ref. |
|---|---|---|---|---|---|
| 2023 | 26th Málaga Film Festival | Best Supporting Actor | Jorge Marrale | Won | |
| 2023 | 26th Málaga Film Festival | Audience's Choice Award | | Won | |

== See also ==
- List of Argentine films of 2023
- List of Spanish films of 2023
