= Diógenes (film) =

2023 film

- Promotional release poster
- Directed by: Leonardo Barbuy La Torre
- Written by: Leonardo Barbuy La Torre
- Produced by: Illari Orccottoma Mendoza
- Starring: Gisela Yupa; Cleiner Yupa; Jorge Pomacanchari
- Cinematography: Mateo Guzmán; Musuk Nolte
- Edited by: Juan Cañola
- Music by: Leonardo Barbuy La Torre
- Production companies: Mosaico; Dublin Films; La Selva Cine
- Distributed by: V&R Films
- Release dates: 14 March 2023 (Málaga); 6 June 2023 (Guadalajara); 11 August 2023 (Lima)
- Running time: 80 minutes
- Countries: Peru; Colombia; France
- Language: Quechua

Diógenes is a 2023 Quechua-language drama film written and directed by Leonardo Barbuy La Torre. It was selected to compete in the Zonazine section at the 26th Málaga Film Festival, where it had its world premiere on March 14, 2023. The film won the Silver Biznaga for Best Ibero-American Film, and Barbuy La Torre won for Best Director. It is a co-production between Peru, Colombia and France.

== Synopsis ==
In the Peruvian Andes, two siblings are raised in isolation by their father, a Tablas de Sarhua painter who exchanges his art in the village for supplies, while his children wait for him, cared for by their dogs. One morning, Diógenes does not wake up. Sabina and Santiago live for three days with the corpse of their father, longing for him to open his eyes. After acknowledging his death, they will go in search of their past.

== Cast ==
- Gisela Yupa as Sabina
- Cleiner Yupa as Santiago
- Jorge Pomacanchari as Diógenes

== Release ==
Diógenes had its world premiere on March 14, 2023, as part of the 26th Málaga Film Festival, in competition within the Zonazine section. It made it to the main competitive selection of the Cinélatino – 35th Rencontres de Toulouse, premiering on March 26, 2023. In June, it competed in the 38th Guadalajara International Film Festival within the Ibero-American Fiction Feature section, screening on June 6, 2023. It premiered on August 11, 2023, as part of the Fiction competition at the 27th Lima Film Festival.

== Accolades ==
Year	Award / Festival	Category	Recipient	Result	Ref.
2023	26th Málaga Film Festival	Silver Biznaga to Best Ibero-American Film	Diógenes	Won	
2023	26th Málaga Film Festival	Best Director	Leonardo Barbuy La Torre	Won	
2023	38th Guadalajara International Film Festival	Iberoamerican Competition – Best Film	Diógenes	Nominated	
2023	27th Lima Film Festival	Best Picture	Diógenes	Nominated	
2024	15th APRECI Awards	Best Peruvian Feature Film	Diógenes	Nominated	
2024	15th APRECI Awards	Best Actress	Gisela Yupa	Nominated	

== See also ==
- List of Peruvian films
