= Great Yarmouth: Provisional Figures =

- Directed by: Marco Martins
- Written by: Ricardo Adolfo; Marco Martins
- Produced by: Kamilla Hodol
- Starring: Beatriz Batarda; Nuno Lopes; Peter Caulfield
- Cinematography: João Ribeiro
- Edited by: Mariana Gaivão
- Music by: Jim Williams
- Distributed by: NOS Audiovisuais
- Release dates: September 2022 (Zinemaldia); 16 March 2023 (Portugal)
- Running time: 112 minute
- Countries: United Kingdom; France; Portugal
- Languages: English; Portuguese

Great Yarmouth: Provisional Figures is a 2022 British-French-Portuguese drama film directed by Marco Martins. It competed for a Golden Shell in category: Best Picture at the 70th 2022 San Sebastian International Film Festival. The film follows the struggles of Portuguese immigrants in a dilapidated English seaside town shortly before Brexit. Martins shot the film entirely on location in Great Yarmouth, Norfolk, UK and film dialogue is in English and Portuguese. The film was distributed by NOS Audiovisuais and grossed £30,351 worldwide at the box office.

== Synopsis ==
Hundreds of Portuguese immigrants seeking work arrive to the seaside resort town of Great Yarmouth on Norfolk's East Coast, three months before the Brexit vote. Tânia, also a Portuguese immigrant, dreams of quitting her job supervising her fellow immigrants in the local poultry factories slaughtering and butchering turkeys for consumption, to refurbish her English husband's decrepit hotels housing her fellow countrymen in squalid and dingy conditions into Senior Citizen's Homes.

== Cast ==
- Beatriz Batarda as Tânia
- Nuno Lopes as Carlos
- Romeu Runa as Raúl
- Robert Elliot as Bob
- Kris Hitchen as Richard
- Peter Caulfield as Joe
- Rita Cabaço as Sandra
- Hugo Bentes as Cardoso

== Release ==
The film premiered at the 70th 2022 San Sebastian International Film Festival, held annually in the Spanish city of Donostia-San Sebastián. It is slated for theatrical release in Portugal on 16 March 2023.

== Reception ==
Deadline's Anna Smith wrote: "Great Yarmouth: Provisional Figures is a tough but riveting watch" and particularly praised the lead role of Tânia as "beautifully performed by Batarda, whose character is always fascinating". Whilst ScreenDaily's Jonathan Romney called the film a "A chilling essay in hard social realism, but with a nightmarish expressionistic spin".

== Awards and nominations ==
Award	Date	Category	Recipient	Result	Ref.
San Sebastian International Film Festival	16 September 2022	Golden Shell Prize	Great Yarmouth: Provisional Figures	Nominated	
Guadalajara International Film Festival	4 June 2023	Best Screenplay in Ibero-American Feature Film	Great Yarmouth: Provisional Figures	Won	
Guadalajara International Film Festival	4 June 2023	Best Actress in Ibero-American Feature Film	Great Yarmouth: Provisional Figures	Won	
