= Jordi Rebellón =

Spanish actor (1957–2021)

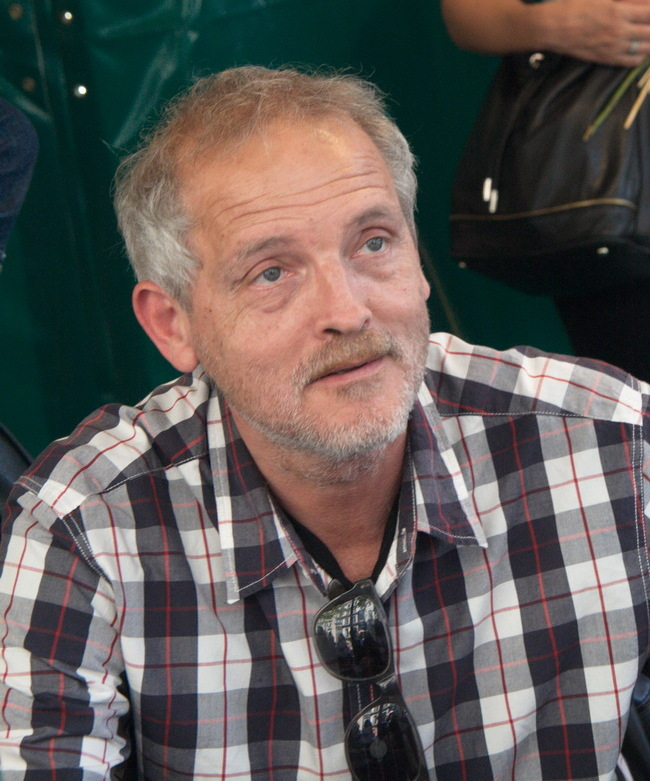
- At the 2015 Saint George's Day
- Born: Jordi Rebellón López; 15 February 1957; Barcelona, Spain
- Died: 8 September 2021 (aged 64); Madrid, Spain
- Occupation: Actor

Jordi Rebellón López (15 February 1957 – 8 September 2021) was a Spanish television, cinema and stage actor known for his role as Rodolfo Vilches in popular television series Hospital Central.

== Biography ==
Jordi Rebellón López was born in Barcelona on 15 February 1957. He made his television debut with a minor performance in Barrio Sésamo.

In 2000, he joined the cast of Hospital Central to play Dr. Vilches, a role for which he became extremely popular in Spain. He left the series in the 14th season, but returned in the 18th season.

He died from a stroke on 8 September 2021 in Madrid.

== Works ==
Television series

- Hospital Central as Doctor Rodolfo Vilches (2000–2012)
- Mercado Central as Fernando Luján
- Cuéntame cómo pasó as Pachín.
- Sin identidad as Francisco José Fuentes.
- Amar es para siempre as Luis Ardanza.
- Médico de familia as Ángel Valverde.
- Servir y proteger as Alfonso Ocaña.
- Makinavaja as Sargento Oroño
- Fago as Mateo Ibarra.

Television programs

- Tu cara me suena, as guest (2015)
- El gran reto musical, as guest (2017)

Filmography

- El complot dels anells (1988)
- La señora del Oriente Express (1989)
- La telaraña (1990)
- El largo invierno (1992)
- J.V. (1993)
- La fiebre del oro (1993)
- Mal de amores, como el chico del noticiario. Dir. Carlos Balagué (1993)
- Todo falso (Ni un pam de net) (1993)
- Adiós Tiburón (1996)
- Reflejos de una dama (2001)
- Ausencias (2001)
- Roma no paga traidores (2002)
- GAL (2006)
- Enloquecidas (2008)
- Beige (2012)

Theater

- Quan Spidoux s'adorm
- Don Joan Moliere
- L’hostal de la Gloria
- Mentiras, incienso y mirra (2008)
- Don Juan Tenorio (2010)
- Desclasificados (2013)
- El funeral (2018)

Books

- Yo quise ser Supermán, ed. Suma, ISBN 9788483658062.

== Awards ==
- Zapping Award for best actor for Hospital Central (2003).
- Fotograma de Plata Award nomination for Best Actor for Hospital Central (2006)
- TP de Oro for best series Hospital Central (2007)
- Award "Brujo del Año" granted by the Federación de Peñas Festeras y Culturales de las Fiestas de Mayo de Alcantarilla (2010)
