= Elena Tarrats =

Spanish actress

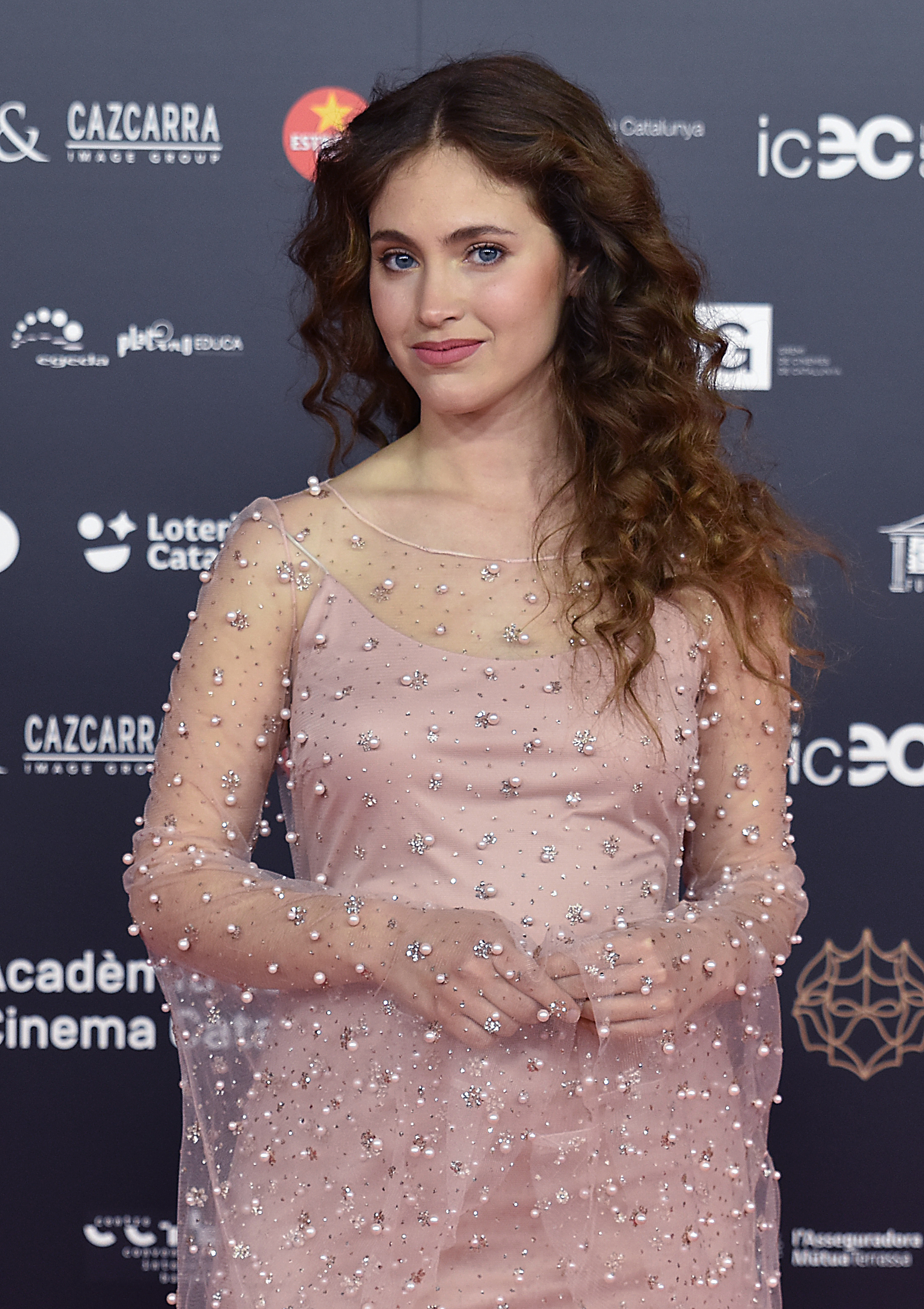
- Elena Tarrats in 2021
- Born: Elena Tarrats Gómez; 19 December 1993 (age 31); Barcelona, Spain
- Occupation: Actress
- Years active: 2009–present

Elena Tarrats Gómez (Barcelona, Spain; 19 December 1993) is a Spanish stage, television and film actress and singer.

== Biography ==
Born in Barcelona in 1993, Tarrats studied an intermediate degree in musical theater at the Memory School in Barcelona. She has also taken several courses in singing, dance and musical language.

She began her professional career as part of the musical group SP3, of the children's channel Club Super3 of TV3; where she worked until 2011. Her first fixed character in a television series was that of Gemma Fernández in the TV3 series Ventdelplà, where she participated in the last two seasons and where she coincided with Carlos Cuevas, Llorenç González and Lluïsa Mallol.

In cinema she made her debut in Ventura Pons' film Mil Cretinos, where she played María. In 2011 she had her first role on national television with the character of Catalina in the Antena 3 period drama Antena 3 Gran Hotel. Other supporting roles followed in Cuéntame cómo pasó, Familia: manual de supervivencia and 39+1.

Despite having participated in numerous audiovisual projects, Tarrats has developed much of her career in theater. In 2017s she participated in L'ànec salvatge, by Norwegian playwright Henrik Ibsen directed by Julio Manrique at the Teatre Lliure in Barcelona. In 2018 she worked with the Catalan company Dagoll Dagom in the play Maremar, a musical with texts by William Shakespeare, music by Lluís Llach and with the situation of refugees in southeastern Europe as a common thread.

== Filmography ==
=== Theater ===
Year	Title	Directed by	Dramaturgy	Notes
2011–2012	Dreamin' and rappin'	Moisés Maicas		
2011–2012	Límits	Miguel Ángel Raió	Marta Solé	
2012–2013	El último día de febrero	Míriam Escurriola	La Hydra (Elena Tarrats and Marc Oller)	
2012–2013	Tot és fum. L'amor en cinc intents	Míriam Escurriola		Grec Festival 2013
2014	Generació de merda (Un musical de llum i color)		Xavi Morató and Gerard Sesé	
2014	Si quieres dulce no pidas calamares		David Pintó	
2014	Campamentos		David Pintó	
2014–2016	Mar i cel	Dagoll Dagom	Ángel Guimerá	
2015	Joc de miralls	Juan Carlos Martel	Annie Baker	
2016	Si au Si	Marjorie Currenti	La Gran Troupe	Temporada Alta Festival 2016
2016	L'Avar	Josep María Mestres	Molière	
2017	L'ànec salvatge	Julio Manrique	Henrik Ibsen	
2018	Maremar	Dagoll Dagom	William Shakespeare	
	El llibertí	Joan Lluís Bozzo		

=== Television ===
Year	Title	Character	Channel	Role
2009–2010	Ventdelplà	Gemma Fernández	TV3	Supporting role
2011	La Sagrada Familia	Carlota	TV3	Episodic
2011	Gran Hotel	Catalina	Antena 3	Supporting role
2012	Cuéntame cómo pasó	Reme	TVE	Episodic
2012	Marhaba	Emma		
2013	Familia: Manual de supervivencia	Lidia	Telecinco	Supporting role
2014	39+1	Michelle	TV3	Episodic
2014	El cas dels catalans	Elisabet Cristina	TV3	TV-movie
2015	La Xirgu	Sara	TV3, TVG and Canal Sur	TV-movie
2016	Mar i cel	Maria	TV3	TV-movie
2019	Vida perfecta	María	Movistar+	Episodic

=== Cinema ===
- 2014: Ningú no pot somiar per tu, by Sergi Cervera.
- 2013: Barcelona, noche de verano, by Dani de la Orden.
- 2012: La verdadera historia de Caperucita Roja y el lobo ¿feroz?, by Dídac Cervera. Short film.
- 2011: Mil cretinos (2011), by Ventura Pons.

== Discografía ==
- Ma. El poder de decidir (2013): Her first solo album, together with pianist Yamini T. Prabhu.
- Cantos de poeta (2016): First album by Gelria, Galician music trio.
