= Michel Noher =

Argentine actor (born 1983)

- Born: April 14, 1983 (age 41); Buenos Aires, Argentina
- Occupation(s): Actor and Television Host
- Years active: 2001–present
- Partner: Celeste Cid (2016–2018)
- Children: Antón Noher (b. 2016)
- Parent: Jean Pierre Noher

Michel Noher (born April 14, 1983) is an Argentine actor.

== Biography ==
Michel is the son of the renowned French actor Jean Pierre Noher. He lived with his mother in Bariloche from the age of four to seventeen and then went to live in Buenos Aires, Argentina and began studying cinema and theater.

== Personal life ==
On April 22, 2016, it was announced that he was about to have a child with the actress Celeste Cid, news that surprised everyone since the couple had not made their relationship public until then. Antón was born on October 13, 2016.

== Filmography ==
=== Movies ===
Year	Movie	Character	Director
2001	30/30	30/30 (young)	
2005	Enamorada de la muerte		
2006	Las Manos	Seminarian	Alejandro Doria
2009	Felicitas	Samuel Saenz Valiente	
2010	And Soon the Darkness	Chucho	Marcos Efron
2010	Propios y Extraños	Ricardo	
2018	El desentierro	Jordi	
2019	Vigilia en agosto		Luis María Mercado

=== Television ===
Year	Title	Character	Channel
2003	Costumbres argentinas	Juan	Telefe
2004	El deseo	Manuel Ocampo	Telefe
2006	Amas de casa desesperadas	Bruno	Canal 13
2006-2007	Sos mi vida	Jerónimo Ávila	Canal 13
2008-2009	Don Juan y su bella dama	Pedro "Peter" Fernández	Telefe
2010	Consentidos	Alejo García Mujica	Disney Channel
2011	El pacto	Pablo González Gava	América TV
2011-2012	Herederos de una venganza	Jacques	Canal 13
2012	Terra ribelle	Alberto Dell'Arco	RAI 1
2012	Historia clínica	Francisco López Merino	Telefe
2013	Historias de corazón	Pablo	Telefe
2013-2014	Aliados	Taylor	Telefe
2014	Mis amigos de siempre	José María	Canal 13
2014	La celebración	Eleazar	Telefe
2014	O Rebu	Antonio González	Rede Globo
2015	Sete Vidas	Felipe Soares Viegas	Rede Globo
2015-2016	Esperanza mía	Nicolás Aguilera	Canal 13
2017	Amar después de amar	Detective Emeterio Godoy	Telefe
2017	La búsqueda de Laura	Detective Emeterio Godoy	Telefe
2018	Cien días para enamorarse	Fidel Garrido	Telefe
2020	La unidad	Marcos	Movistar+

=== Television Programs ===
Year	Program	Channel	Notes
2016	Hola y adiós	Telefe	Television Host

=== Theater ===
Year	Title	Character	Director	Theater
2017	Lo prohibido		Daniel Vila	

== Awards and nominations ==
Year	Award	Category	Work	Result
2008	Clarín Awards	Revelation	Don Juan y su bella dama	Nominated
