= Manuel Dueso =

Spanish actor, dramatist and theatre director (1953–2026)

Manuel Duesco
- Born: 2 August 1953; Sabadell, Catalonia, Spain
- Died: 8 September 2026 (aged 73); Barcelona, Catalonia, Spain
- Occupations: Actor, stage director, poet

Manuel Dueso Almirall (2 August 1953 – 8 September 2026), also known as Manel Dueso, was a Spanish actor, dramatist, theatre director and poet.

== Life and career ==
Dueso was born in Sabadell on 2 August 1953. He began writing poetry as a teenager.

He began acting at the Sant Vicenç Parish Center in La Creu Alta. Later, he studied at the Barcelona Theatre Institute with Carlos Gandolfo, José Sanchís Sinisterra, and Pierre Chabert, graduating with a degree in the dramatic arts.

Dueso authored more than twenty plays.

In addition to working in theatre, Dueso also worked in television and film as an actor, casting director, and screenwriter.

Dueso died in Barcelona on 8 September 2026, at the age of 73, after a long illness.

== Stage roles ==
- 1993: Mi hermano del alma
- 1996: Platón ha muerto
- 1997: Nissaga de poder (Metge Merçé)
- 2006: El verí del teatre de Rodolf Sirera
- 2006: En Pólvora d'Àngel Guimerà
- 2006: L'agressor
- 2007: El dia del profeta Joan Brossa
- 2007: L'olor sota la pell
- 2007: Saló Primavera (as Porter)
- 2008: Dublin Carol
- 2009: La Ruta Blava

== Filmography ==
=== Film ===
- Sleep Tight (2011)
- Eva (2011)
- The Body (2012)
- The Invisible Guest (2016)

=== Television ===
- La Riera
- El Cor de la Ciutat
- Cuéntame cómo pasó

== Directing work ==
=== Plays ===
- 1998: Estriptis
- 1999: La presa
- 2000: Un tramvia anomenat Desig
- 2001: Matem els homes
- 2001: Estiu
- 2001: Restes humanes sense identificar...
- 2003: Tempesta de neu
- 2003: J.R.S. (de dotze anys)
- 2003: Les amargues llàgrimes de Petra Von Kant
- 2003: Obres de Guerra: vermell, negre i ignorant
- 2004: Como en las mejores familias
- 2004: Fortuna accidental
- 2005: El beso de la mujer araña
- 2005: El presoner de la segona avinguda
- 2006: Anitta Split
- 2008: Benefactors
- 2008: Las criadas, by Jean Genet.
- 2008: Dublin Carol

== Publications ==
=== Plays ===
- 1998: Estriptis
- 2004: Matem els homes
- 2004: Fortuna accidental
- Mata'm (Lapislàtzuli, 2023)
- L'encant de les nenes (Bromera, 2024)
- 2025: Jambo Bwana

=== Poetry ===
- Som cavalls d'escuma en camps de menta (Lapislàtzuli, 2026)
