= Marco Martins =

Portuguese Film and Theatre director (born 1972)

- A promotional photograph of Marco Martins
- Born: 1972 (age 53–54); Lisbon, Portugal
- Occupation: film director
- Years active: 1994–present

Marco Martins (born 1972) is a Portuguese film and theatre director, best known for his 2005 film Alice, which premiered at Cannes and won the Best Picture Award at the Directors' Fortnight.

== Biography ==
In 1994 Marco Martins graduated from Lisbon Theatre and Film School (Escola Superior de Teatro e Cinema), and soon afterwards undertook an apprenticeship with Wim Wenders, Manoel de Oliveira and Bertrand Tavernier.

During this period, his short films Mergulho no Ano Novo and No Caminho Para a Escola received critical acclaim, the former winning Best Short Film Award at the International Short Films Festival of Vila do Conde, and the latter taking Best Short Film and Best Director Awards at the VII Festival Ibérico de Cinema de Badajoz as well as the Eixo Atlântico Award at the Festival de Ourense.

In 2005, his first feature film, Alice, premiered at the Cannes Film Festival, and received a number of international awards and made the long list for the Academy Awards Foreign Language Film prize.

A year later Marco Martins collaborates with screenwriter Tonino Guerra (a regular collaborator with Michelangelo Antonioni, Fellini, Tarkovsky or Theo Angelopoulos) in the film A Longer Year premiered at the 2006 Venice Film Festival in competition.

In 2007, together with the actress Beatriz Batarda, he created the theater company Arena Ensemble. A creative platform where he develops a work with a strong experimental and social component. His works, for the stage, have been presented on the main national stages and in international festivals. In 2018, his show Provisional Figures, created with the Portuguese community of Great Yarmouth, debuted at the Norwich / Norfolk International Festival. His most recent creation Perfil Perdu debuted at the Istanbul International Festival.

In 2011 the director collaborated with the artist Filipa César in the short film Insert, part of the artist's exhibition at the Centro Cultural de Belém, which would win the prestigious BES PHOTO prize and debut at the Rotterdam International Festival.

In 2013, Marco Martins collaborated with the Italian artist Michelangelo Pistoletto in the creation of the film Twenty-One-Twelve- The Day The World Didn't End premiered at the Louvre Museum and at the Rome Festival.

In 2016 directed São Jorge presented at Venice Film Festival (Golden Lion Best actor) and portuguese contender to the Oscars.

In 2022 directed Great Yarmouth: Provisional Figures based on their earlier 2018 theater production. It debuted at the San Sebastian Film Festival where it was nominated for a Golden Shell prize.

== Filmography ==
=== Cinema ===
- Great Yarmouth: Provisional Figures (2022)
- Saint George (São Jorge) (2016)
- Twenty-One-Twelve: The Day the World Didn't End (2013)
- Keep Going (2011)
- Traces of a Diary (2009 / 2010) (documentário)
- Insert (2010 / 2011) (curta-metragem)
- How to Draw a Perfect Circle (Como Desenhar um Círculo Perfeito) (2009 / 2010)
- A Longer Year (Um Ano Mais Longo) (2006 / 2007) (curta-metragem)
- Alice (2005 / 2006)
- On My Way to School (No Caminho para a Escola) (1998) (curta-metragem)
- Clockwise (1996) (curta-metragem)
- Não Basta Ser Cruel (1995) (curta-metragem)
- New Year´s Dive (Mergulho no Ano Novo) (1992) (curta-metragem)

=== TV ===
- Sara (2018)

== Awards and festivals ==
Film	Awards	Festivals	
Sara (2018)	Television - Fiction	Autores Awards, Portugal	Winner
Sara (2018)	Best Series or TV Movie	Portuguese Film Academy Sophia Awards	Winner
Sara (2018)	Best Series	Tropheus TV 7 Dias	Nominee
Sara (2018)	Best Actor	Tropheus TV 7 Dias	Nominee
Sara (2018)	Best Actress	Tropheus TV 7 Dias	Nominee
Sara (2018)	Best Supporting Actress	Tropheus TV 7 Dias	Nominee
Saint George (São Jorge) (2016)	Venice Horizons Award - Best Actor	Venice Film Festival	Winner
Saint George (São Jorge) (2016)	Venice Horizons Award - Best Film	Venice Film Festival	Nominee
Saint George (São Jorge) (2016)	Best Original Screenplay	Portuguese Film Academy Sophia Awards	Winner
Saint George (São Jorge) (2016)	Best Director	Portuguese Film Academy Sophia Awards	Winner
Saint George (São Jorge) (2016)	Best Film	Portuguese Film Academy Sophia Awards	Winner
Saint George (São Jorge) (2016)	Best Cinematography	Portuguese Film Academy Sophia Awards	Winner
Saint George (São Jorge) (2016)	Best Actor	Portuguese Film Academy Sophia Awards	Winner
Saint George (São Jorge) (2016)	Best Art Direction	Portuguese Film Academy Sophia Awards	Winner
Saint George (São Jorge) (2016)	Best Supporting Actor	Portuguese Film Academy Sophia Awards	Winner
Saint George (São Jorge) (2016)	Best Actress	Portuguese Film Academy Sophia Awards	Nominee
Saint George (São Jorge) (2016)	Best Original Music	Portuguese Film Academy Sophia Awards	Nominee
Saint George (São Jorge) (2016)	Best Sound	Portuguese Film Academy Sophia Awards	Nominee
Saint George (São Jorge) (2016)	Best Supporting Actress	Portuguese Film Academy Sophia Awards	Nominee
Saint George (São Jorge) (2016)	Best Supporting Actor	Portuguese Film Academy Sophia Awards	Nominee
Saint George (São Jorge) (2016)	Best Make-Up	Portuguese Film Academy Sophia Awards	Nominee
Saint George (São Jorge) (2016)	Best Editing	Portuguese Film Academy Sophia Awards	Nominee
Saint George (São Jorge) (2016)	Portuguese Nomination	Academy of Motion Picture Arts and Sciences (Oscars)	Nominee
Saint George (São Jorge) (2016)	Best Screenplay	Autores Awards, Portugal	Winner
Saint George (São Jorge) (2016)	Best Film	Autores Awards, Portugal	Winner
Saint George (São Jorge) (2016)	Best Actor	Autores Awards, Portugal	Winner
Saint George (São Jorge) (2016)	Best Movie	Golden Globes, Portugal	Winner
Saint George (São Jorge) (2016)	Best Actor	Golden Globes, Portugal	Winner
Saint George (São Jorge) (2016)	Best Supporting Actor	Golden Globes, Portugal	Nominee
Saint George (São Jorge) (2016)	Portuguese Nomination	Goya Awards	Nominee
Saint George (São Jorge) (2016)		Sydney Film Festival	
Saint George (São Jorge) (2016)		Chicago International Film Festival	
Saint George (São Jorge) (2016)	Best Director	International Film Festival & Awards Macau	Winner
Saint George (São Jorge) (2016)	Best Actor	International Film Festival & Awards Macau	Winner
Saint George (São Jorge) (2016)	Best Movie	International Film Festival & Awards Macau	Nominee
Saint George (São Jorge) (2016)		Mostra de Cinema de São Paulo	
Saint George (São Jorge) (2016)		Buenos Aires Film Festival	
Saint George (São Jorge) (2016)		Dubai International Film Festival	
Saint George (São Jorge) (2016)		Thessaloniki International Film Festival	
Saint George (São Jorge) (2016)	Performance in a Leading Role	Screen Actors GDA Foundation	Winner
Saint George (São Jorge) (2016)	Prix Sauvage - Best Feature Film	Festival of European Films in Paris	Nominee
Saint George (São Jorge) (2016)		Prague Febiofest	
Saint George (São Jorge) (2016)		Hong Kong European FF	
Saint George (São Jorge) (2016)		International Film Festival of Panama	
Saint George (São Jorge) (2016)		Barcelona International Auteur Film Festival	
Saint George (São Jorge) (2016)		Krakow Off Camera	
Saint George (São Jorge) (2016)		Film Festival Munich	
Saint George (São Jorge) (2016)		Tbilissi Film Festival	
Saint George (São Jorge) (2016)		Goa Film Festival	
Saint George (São Jorge) (2016)		Copenhagen CPH PIX	
Saint George (São Jorge) (2016)		Venice in Napoles Film Festival	
Saint George (São Jorge) (2016)		20 Semaine du Cinema Lusophone	
Saint George (São Jorge) (2016)	Don Quijote Award	Coimbra Caminhos do Cinema Português	Winner
Saint George (São Jorge) (2016)	Best Actor	Coimbra Caminhos do Cinema Português	Winner
Saint George (São Jorge) (2016)	Best Supporting Actor	Coimbra Caminhos do Cinema Português	Winner
Saint George (São Jorge) (2016)	Top Ten of the Year (National Competition)	CinEuphoria Awards	Winner
Saint George (São Jorge) (2016)	Audience Award - Top Ten of the Year	CinEuphoria Awards	Winner
Saint George (São Jorge) (2016)	Best Film (National Competition)	CinEuphoria Awards	Winner
Saint George (São Jorge) (2016)	Best Actor	CinEuphoria Awards	Winner
Saint George (São Jorge) (2016)	Best Screenplay (National Competition)	CinEuphoria Awards	Nominee
Saint George (São Jorge) (2016)	Best Director (National Competition)	CinEuphoria Awards	Nominee
Saint George (São Jorge) (2016)	Best Trailer (National Competition)	CinEuphoria Awards	Nominee
Saint George (São Jorge) (2016)	Best Poster (National Competition)	CinEuphoria Awards	Nominee
Saint George (São Jorge) (2016)	Best Special Effects (National Competition)	CinEuphoria Awards	Nominee
Saint George (São Jorge) (2016)	Best Make-Up (National Competition)	CinEuphoria Awards	Nominee
Saint George (São Jorge) (2016)	Best Art Direction (National Competition)	CinEuphoria Awards	Nominee
Saint George (São Jorge) (2016)	Best Original Music (National Competition)	CinEuphoria Awards	Nominee
Saint George (São Jorge) (2016)	Best Cinematography (National Competition)	CinEuphoria Awards	Nominee
Saint George (São Jorge) (2016)	Best Editing (National Competition)	CinEuphoria Awards	Nominee
Saint George (São Jorge) (2016)	Best Ensemble (National Competition)	CinEuphoria Awards	Nominee
Saint George (São Jorge) (2016)	Best Supporting Actress (National Competition)	CinEuphoria Awards	Nominee
Saint George (São Jorge) (2016)	Best Supporting Actor (National Competition)	CinEuphoria Awards	Nominee
Saint George (São Jorge) (2016)	Jury Award - Best Film	Áquila Awards	Nominee
Saint George (São Jorge) (2016)	Jury Award - Best Director	Áquila Awards	Nominee
Saint George (São Jorge) (2016)	Jury Award - Best Actor	Áquila Awards	Nominee
Saint George (São Jorge) (2016)	Jury Award - Best Supporting Actor	Áquila Awards	Nominee
Twenty One Twelve: The Day the World Didn’t End (2013)	Official Competition	Festival de Roma	
Twenty One Twelve: The Day the World Didn’t End (2013)	Official Competition	DocLisboa	
Twenty One Twelve: The Day the World Didn’t End (2013)		Louvre Museum	
Insert (2010 / 2011) (co-directed Filipa César)		International Film Festival Rotterdam	
Insert (2010 / 2011) (co-directed Filipa César)	Best Director	IndieLisboa Festival Internacional de Cinema	Winner
Insert (2010 / 2011) (co-directed Filipa César)		Festival de Cinema Luso-Brasileiro	
Insert (2010 / 2011) (co-directed Filipa César)		Femina – International Women’s Film Festival	
Insert (2010 / 2011) (co-directed Filipa César)		Rencontres Audiovisuelles Lille International Short Film Festival	
Insert (2010 / 2011) (co-directed Filipa César)		Vila do Conde International Short Film Festival	
Insert (2010 / 2011) (co-directed Filipa César)		EUNIC Stockholm Kulturhuset	
Insert (2010 / 2011) (co-directed Filipa César)	BES Photo 2010 Award	BES Photo 2010	Winner
Insert (2010 / 2011) (co-directed Filipa César)		Bienal de São Paulo	
Keep Going (2011) Documentary		DocLisboa	
Traces of a Diary (2009 / 2010)	Jury International Award - Honorable Mention	Documenta Madrid	Winner
Traces of a Diary (2009 / 2010)		Goteborg Film Festival	
Traces of a Diary (2009 / 2010)	Experimental Film Competition	Traverse City Film Festival	
Traces of a Diary (2009 / 2010)		Bradford International Film Festival	
Traces of a Diary (2009 / 2010)		5ª Mostra do Documentário Português Panorama	
Traces of a Diary (2009 / 2010)		Transilvania International Film Festival	
Traces of a Diary (2009 / 2010)	National Competition	IndieLisboa Festival Internacional de Cinema	
Traces of a Diary (2009 / 2010)	Art International Competition	Era New Horizons	
Traces of a Diary (2009 / 2010)		Rio de Janeiro International Festival	
Traces of a Diary (2009 / 2010)		Mountain Film Festival	
Traces of a Diary (2009 / 2010)		Kaliningrad European Union Film Festival	
Traces of a Diary (2009 / 2010)		32nd Noorderlijk Film Festival	
Traces of a Diary (2009 / 2010)		Mostra Foto Cine Rio de Janeiro	
How to Draw a Perfect Circle (Como Desenhar um Círculo Perfeito) (2009 / 2010)	Andorinha Trophy - Best Music	CinePort – Portuguese Speaking Countries’ Film Festival	Winner
How to Draw a Perfect Circle (Como Desenhar um Círculo Perfeito) (2009 / 2010)	Andorinha Trophy - Best Actress	CinePort – Portuguese Speaking Countries’ Film Festival	Nominee
How to Draw a Perfect Circle (Como Desenhar um Círculo Perfeito) (2009 / 2010)	Best Director (National Competition)	CinEuphoria Awards	Winner
How to Draw a Perfect Circle (Como Desenhar um Círculo Perfeito) (2009 / 2010)	Best Film	Golden Globes, Portugal	Nominee
How to Draw a Perfect Circle (Como Desenhar um Círculo Perfeito) (2009 / 2010)	Best Actor	Golden Globes, Portugal	Nominee
How to Draw a Perfect Circle (Como Desenhar um Círculo Perfeito) (2009 / 2010)		IndieLisboa Festival Internacional de Cinema	
How to Draw a Perfect Circle (Como Desenhar um Círculo Perfeito) (2009 / 2010)		Kaliningrad European Union Film Festival	
How to Draw a Perfect Circle (Como Desenhar um Círculo Perfeito) (2009 / 2010)	Best Supporting Actress	Coimbra Caminhos do Cinema Português	Winner
How to Draw a Perfect Circle (Como Desenhar um Círculo Perfeito) (2009 / 2010)	Best Art Direction	Coimbra Caminhos do Cinema Português	Winner
How to Draw a Perfect Circle (Como Desenhar um Círculo Perfeito) (2009 / 2010)	Best Original Score	Coimbra Caminhos do Cinema Português	Winner
How to Draw a Perfect Circle (Como Desenhar um Círculo Perfeito) (2009 / 2010)	Best Film	Coimbra Caminhos do Cinema Português	Nominee
How to Draw a Perfect Circle (Como Desenhar um Círculo Perfeito) (2009 / 2010)		European Union Film Festival	
How to Draw a Perfect Circle (Como Desenhar um Círculo Perfeito) (2009 / 2010)	Special Jury Prize - Ensemble Acting	Rio de Janeiro International Film Festival	Winner
How to Draw a Perfect Circle (Como Desenhar um Círculo Perfeito) (2009 / 2010)	Shooting Star Award	Estoril Film Festival	Winner
How to Draw a Perfect Circle (Como Desenhar um Círculo Perfeito) (2009 / 2010)		Puchon International Film Festival	
How to Draw a Perfect Circle (Como Desenhar um Círculo Perfeito) (2009 / 2010)		Muestra de Cine Português	
A Longer Year (Um Ano Mais Longo) (2006 / 2007)	Official Competition	Venice Film Festival	
A Longer Year (Um Ano Mais Longo) (2006 / 2007)		Lisbon Village Festival	
A Longer Year (Um Ano Mais Longo) (2006 / 2007)		Toulouse Latin American Film Festival	
Alice (2005 / 2006)	Prix Regards Jeune - Best Feature Film	Cannes Film Festival	Winner
Alice (2005 / 2006)	C.I.C.A.E.	Cannes Film Festival	Nominee
Alice (2005 / 2006)	Golden Camera	Cannes Film Festival	Nominee
Alice (2005 / 2006)	Best Director	Mar del Plata Film Festival	Winner
Alice (2005 / 2006)	FIPRESCI	Mar del Plata Film Festival	Winner
Alice (2005 / 2006)	ADF Cinematography Award	Mar del Plata Film Festival	Winner
Alice (2005 / 2006)	Best Film (International Competition)	Mar del Plata Film Festival	Nominee
Alice (2005 / 2006)	European Discovery – Fassbinder Award	European Film Awards	Nominee
Alice (2005 / 2006)	Best Director	London Raindance Film Festival	Winner
Alice (2005 / 2006)	Best Actor	Berlin International Film Festival Shooting stars	
Alice (2005 / 2006)		European Union Film Festival, China	
Alice (2005 / 2006)		Kaliningrad European Union Film Festival	
Alice (2005 / 2006)		IFFI Goa	
Alice (2005 / 2006)	Top Films of the Decade (National Competition)	CinEuphoria Awards	Winner
Alice (2005 / 2006)	Best Latin-American Film	Ariel Awards, México	Nominee
Alice (2005 / 2006)	Best New Director	Las Palmas Film Festival	Winner
Alice (2005 / 2006)	Best Foreign Film	The Oscars	Nominee
Alice (2005 / 2006)	Best movie	Golden Globes, Portugal	Winner
Alice (2005 / 2006)	Best Actor	Golden Globes, Portugal	Winner
Alice (2005 / 2006)	Best Actress	Golden Globes, Portugal	Nominee
Alice (2005 / 2006)	Best Film	Coimbra Caminhos do Cinema Português	Winner
Alice (2005 / 2006)	Best Director	CinePort – Portuguese Speaking Countries’ Film Festival	Winner
Alice (2005 / 2006)	Best Editing	CinePort – Portuguese Speaking Countries’ Film Festival	Winner
Alice (2005 / 2006)	Best Cinematography	CinePort – Portuguese Speaking Countries’ Film Festival	Winner
Alice (2005 / 2006)	Best Soundtrack	CinePort – Portuguese Speaking Countries’ Film Festival	Winner
Alice (2005 / 2006)	Best Cinematography	Festival de Cinema Mediterrâneo	Winner
Alice (2005 / 2006)	Candidato Português	Luís Buñuel Award	
Alice (2005 / 2006)		Febiofest	
Alice (2005 / 2006)		1000.000 Retinas	
Alice (2005 / 2006)		Jeonju International Film Festival	
Alice (2005 / 2006)	Best Director	Festival de Cinema Luso Brasileiro	Winner
Alice (2005 / 2006)	Best Actor	Festival de Cinema Luso Brasileiro	Winner
Alice (2005 / 2006)	Official Competition	Lubliana Film Festival	
Alice (2005 / 2006)	Official Competition	Taiwan Film Festival	
Alice (2005 / 2006)		Danish Film Institute	
Alice (2005 / 2006)		Taipei Golden Horse Film Festival	
Alice (2005 / 2006)		Haifa International Film Festival	
Alice (2005 / 2006)	Official Competition	Festival do Rio de Janeiro	
Alice (2005 / 2006)	Official Competition	Provincetown Film Festival	
Alice (2005 / 2006)	Official Competition	New York Tribeca Film Festival	
Alice (2005 / 2006)		BFI – London Psychology Film Festival	
Alice (2005 / 2006)		Havana Internacional Film Festival	
Alice (2005 / 2006)		MK2 Paris Festival Mostra de Novo Cinema Português	
On My Way to School (No Caminho para a Escola) (1998)	Eixo Atlântico Award Best Film	Ourense Independent Film Festival	Winner
On My Way to School (No Caminho para a Escola) (1998)	Best Film	Iberia Film Festival	Winner
On My Way to School (No Caminho para a Escola) (1998)	Best Director	Iberia Film Festival	Winner
New Year’s Dive (Mergulho no Ano Novo) (1992)	Best Film (National Competition)	Vila do Conde International Short Film Festival	Winner
New Year’s Dive (Mergulho no Ano Novo) (1992)		Tel-Aviv International Film Festival	
New Year’s Dive (Mergulho no Ano Novo) (1992)		Valencia Film	
New Year’s Dive (Mergulho no Ano Novo) (1992)		Festival Cinema Juve’95	
New Year’s Dive (Mergulho no Ano Novo) (1992)		Toulouse Film Festival	
