= Alejandro Suárez Lozano =

Spanish film director (born 1980)

Alejandro Suarez Lozano
- Born: 1980 (age 45–46); Barakaldo, Basque Country, Spain
- Education: CEU San Pablo University
- Occupations: Film director and writer

Alejandro Suárez Lozano (born 1980), is a Spanish film director and writer. He wrote, directed, and produced several short films including The Fisherman and Hidden Soldier, that received more than 70 awards and 300 official selections around the world. Suárez is currently working on his debut feature film Mogwai that is based on his short film The Fisherman, in collaboration with British screenwriter Gary Young.

== Film career ==
In 2016, Suárez took the Top Prize - Bucheon Award - and the Aurora Media prize for his sci fi horror feature film pitch, Mogwai, at the Network of Asian Fantastic Films (NAFF), a part of the new 7-day industry program BiFan Industry Gathering (BiG) in Bucheon, South Korea.

On August 29, 2016, Aurora Media announced its $30 million global media fund to "invest in film, broadcast content, new media technologies and infrastructures in the wider regional and international market." Mogwai is included on its slate of upcoming projects. The project is in development.

Suárez's latest short film, The Fisherman, won notable awards including a special mention at BiFan, and the best short film at Nocturna Madrid International Fantastic Film Festival SHOTS section and the Seminci Castilla y Leon section. The Fisherman also won best short film at the 38th Edition of the Festival Internacional de Cine Independiente de Elche (Elche International Film Festival), which qualified The Fisherman to be pre-selected for the Goya Awards.

On The Fisherman, Elche International Film Festival said on their Facebook page that Hollywood will be envious if they see this film. This is in reference to how the film looks like a Hollywood picture but made with less budget.

Terror and science fiction blog Aullidos wrote, "our mouths dropped at the opening short, The Fisherman, which was filmed in Hong Kong skillfully by Alejandro Suárez.". The Fisherman was the opening short film before the premiere of American horror feature film It Follows at the 2015 Nocturna International Film Festival. Industry Spanish film blog Los Horas Perdidas wrote that Suárez is "a director to watch."

In 2016, Suárez served on the jury panel for the 61st edition of the Seminci International Film Festival in the Castille and Leon short film section, the same section which he won in 2015 with The Fisherman.

Suárez worked as a 2nd Unit Director for the feature documentary, Delicate Balance (or Frágil Equilibrio in Spanish). In 2017, it won the Spanish Goya Academy Award for Best Documentary Film.

== Early life ==
Suárez was born in Barakaldo, Basque Country in Spain and is the son of filmmaker Julio Suárez Vega known for his adventure comedy At Full Gallop and Tritones. His family moved to Léon when he was one year-old. Suárez first experienced working with film when he helped his father shoot short films with Super 8 camera. In 1999, Suarez began his professional career as a storyboard artist, working under the guidance of renown Spanish directors Achero Mañas and Daniel Monzón. In 2005, Suarez co-directed his first short film Escorzo with Guillermo Navajo.

== Filmography ==
=== Feature films ===
- Mogwai (in development)
- Kepler Sexto B

=== Short films ===
- The Fisherman (2015)
- El Hombre que Vive Sueña (2015)
- Carpinteros - Wood Work (2013)
- Hidden Soldier (2010)
- Escorzo (2005)

=== Documentaries ===
- Frágil Equilibrio (2016) as 2nd Unit Director
- El Último Rey de León (2011)
