= List of films set in Barcelona =

In the history of motion pictures, many films have been set in Barcelona or a fictionalized version thereof.

The list that follows is sorted by the year the film was released.

== 1960s ==
- Fata Morgana (Vicente Aranda, 1965)
- Noche de vino tinto (José María Nunes, 1966)

== 1970s ==
- Poodle (Bigas Luna, 1979)

== 1980s ==
- Perras callejeras (José Antonio de la Loma, 1985)
- Sinatra (Francesc Betriu, 1988)
- If They Tell You I Fell (Vicente Aranda, 1989)

== 1990s ==
- The Long Winter (Jaime Camino, 1992)
- Makinavaja, el último choriso (Carlos Suárez, 1992)
- The Bilingual Lover (Vicente Aranda, 1993)
- The Greek Labyrinth (Rafael Alcázar, 1993)
- Barcelona (Whit Stillman, 1994)
- Souvenir (Rosa Vergés, 1994)
- Land and Freedom (Ken Loach, 1995)
- Freedom Fighters (Vicente Aranda, 1996)
- The Pianist (Mario Gas, 1998)
- The City of Marvels (Mario Camus, 1999)
- All About My Mother (Pedro Almodóvar, 1999)

== 2000s ==
- Fausto 5.0 (Àlex Ollé, Carlos Padrissa and Isidro Ortiz, 2001)
- My Sweet (Jesús Mora, 2001)
- In This Tricky Life (Beatriz Flores Silva, 2001)
- The Shanghai Spell (Fernando Trueba, 2002)
- L'Auberge espagnole (Cédric Klapisch, 2002)
- In the City (Cesc Gay, 2003)
- Unconscious (Joaquín Oristrell, 2004)
- Salvador (Manuel Huerga, 2006)
- The Cheetah Girls 2 (Kenny Ortega, 2006)
- REC (Jaume Balagueró and Paco Plaza, 2007)
- Vicky Cristina Barcelona (Woody Allen, 2008)
- 25 Carat (Patxi Amezcua, 2008)
- V.O.S (Cesc Gay, 2009)

== 2010s ==
- Biutiful (Alejandro González Iñárritu, 2010)
- The Great Vazquez (Óscar Aibar, 2010)
- The Impossible Language (Rodrigo Rodero, 2010)
- Sleep Tight (Jaume Balagueró, 2011)
- The Wild Ones (Patricia Ferreira, 2012)
- The Last Days (David Pastor and Àlex Pastor, 2013)
- Sweet Home (Rafa Martínez, 2015)
- Night Tales (Manuela Burló, 2016)
- Gun City (Dani de la Torre, 2018)

== 2020s ==
- The Paramedic (Carles Torras, 2020)
- The Barcelona Vampiress (Lluís Danés, 2020)
- Prison 77 (Alberto Rodríguez, 2022)
- The Final Game (Àlex Murrull and Dani de la Orden, 2022)
- Bird Box Barcelona (Álex Pastor and David Pastor, 2023)
- Jokes & Cigarettes (David Trueba, 2023)
- I Don't Expect Anyone to Believe Me (Fernando Frías de la Parra, 2023)
- The 47 (Marcel Barrena, 2024)
- Last Stop: Rocafort St. (Luis Prieto, 2024)
- Marco, the Invented Truth (Aitor Arregi and Jon Garaño, 2024)
- Olivia and the Invisible Earthquake (Irene Iborra Rizo, 2025)
- Another Man (David Moragas, 2025)
- Bros (Carol and Marina Rodríguez Colás, 2026)
- Dating in Barcelona (Gemma Ferraté, 2026)
