= The Bilingual Lover =

1993 Spanish film by Vicente Aranda

El Amante Bilingüe
- Theatrical release poster
- Directed by: Vicente Aranda
- Written by: Vicente Aranda
- Produced by: Andrés Vicente Gómez
- Starring: Imanol Arias; Ornella Muti; Loles León; Javier Bardem
- Cinematography: Juan Amorós
- Edited by: Teresa Font
- Music by: José Nieto
- Production company: Lola Films
- Distributed by: United International Pictures
- Release dates: 1 April 1993 (Spain); 8 June 1993 (Italy)
- Running time: 113 minutes
- Countries: Spain; Italy
- Languages: Spanish; Catalan
- Budget: P163,969,792

The Bilingual Lover (Spanish: El Amante Bilingüe) is a 1993 Spanish film, written and directed by Vicente Aranda and adapted from a novel by Juan Marsé. The film stars Imanol Arias, Ornella Muti and Loles León. The film is a grotesque drama, with some elements of comedy. Set in Barcelona in the 1980s, El Amante Bilingüe takes an ironic approach to Catalan linguistic policies, nationalism and eroticism with a pattern of double identity that was based on elements from the author's life.

== Plot ==
Juan Marés (an anagram of the author's name) is a Catalan man from a humble background, the son of a frustrated zarzuela seamstress and an illusionist known as Fu-Ching. He grew up in Barcelona during the 1950s, dreaming of leaving his poverty behind. In December 1970, he meets his future wife at a photographic exhibit, when he involves himself with a group organizing a four-day hunger strike to protest the verdict of the 1969 show trials in Burgos. There he meets Norma Valenti, the only daughter of a wealthy family of traditional and conservative Catalan background. In spite of economic, social and cultural differences between them, Juan and Norma get married.

Norma works for the department of linguistics of the Generalitat regional government, while Juan (or Joan, his Catalan name) is overwhelmed by the social position acquired through the marriage. There is little use in Marés’ new life for his skills as ventriloquist or accordion player. After five years, the marriage starts to fall apart, when Norma’s real character surfaces. The beautiful Norma is proud and cold, with dark sexual tendencies. She has a special attraction for “xarnegos”, lower-class migrants from other parts of Spain. Norma also has a shoe fetish and makes the men she sleeps with hold up a shoe with their erection. Returning home earlier than expected, Juan finds his wife having sex with a xarnego shoe shiner. Her infidelity revealed, Norma leaves her husband.

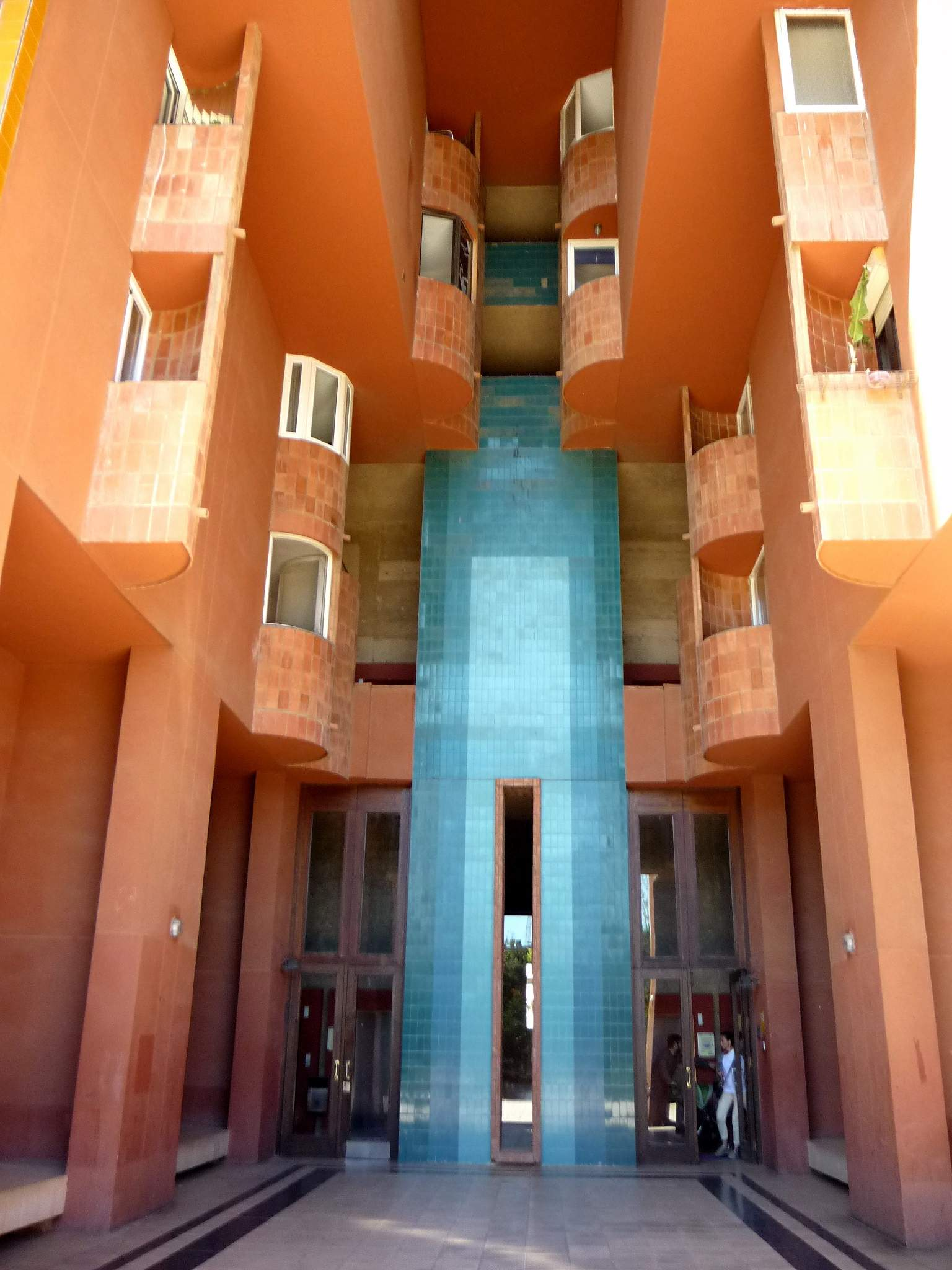
Juan and Griselda live in Walden 7. The building's problem with falling tiles is shown in the film.

Juan retains their apartment in Walden 7, but without his wife's financial support he must eke out a living by playing the accordion and busking for money in the streets of La Rambla. While performing on the streets, he is caught up in a confrontation between a pro-Catalan language group and some Francoist thugs. Juan plays Els Segadors, the national anthem of Catalonia, and the paramilitary extremists throw a Molotov cocktail at him. Disfigured in the explosion and his personality transformed by misfortune, Juan Marés falls deeper into indigence and schizophrenic hallucinations. Obsessed with the happiness he has lost and with the memory of his wife, he encounters Norma while he is performing on the streets, but she fails to recognize him. In disguise, Marés talks to her again during the carnival in Barcelona; only at the end of their talk does he impart a clue to his identity. Another day he telephones her, pretending to need help in the translation of words from Spanish into Catalan.

His hallucinations increasing, a new identity takes shape in his mind: the emphatically non-Catalan Juan Faneca (the author's birth name). Faneca has a strong regional accent, a pencil mustache, dark complexion, sharp sideburns and eye patch. In this role he is a xarnego from Murcia and a childhood friend of Marés, coming back to Barcelona after years supposedly living as a worker in Germany. Disguised as Faneca, Juan seduces his lonely neighbor, Griselda, an Andalusian widow who is embracing everything Catalan to start her new life in Barcelona. Their one-night stand leaves both Juan and Norma disappointed. By then the invented character of Juan Faneca has overtaken Marés, and he continues his life with Griselda.

== Production ==
Spanish director Vicente Aranda became well known in Spain in the 1980s for cinematic adaptations of literary works. He felt a close affinity with novelist Juan Marsé; they had shared similar childhood experiences in their native Barcelona. Aranda had previously adapted two other Marsé novels to the big screen — La Muchacha de las Bragas de Oro and If They Tell You I Fell — and in 1992 he wanted to make a third adaptation from a Marsé novel. Aranda recalled, 'Juan Marsé sent me the manuscript of the novel El Amante Bilingüe, and I liked it. Andres Vicente Gómez, the producer, was not very eager to take on this project; he considered it too regional, very Catalan. In spite of it all, we made the film.' Gomez says that he and Marsé thought that Mario Camus was the most appropriate director to make the film.

El Amante Bilingüe, a co-production with Italy, had a budget of 164 million pesetas (then about $1.36 million USD or 1.04 million Euros). Shot in Barcelona, it premiered at the Montreal World Film Festival, where it was well received. El Amante Bilingüe was then released in Spain on 1 April 1993.

== Cast ==
- Imanol Arias as Joan Marés/Juan Faneca
- Ornella Muti as Norma Valenti
- Loles León as Griselda
- Javier Bardem as Shoeshiner
- Joan Lluis Bozzo as Valls Verdú
- Blanca Apilánez as Carmen

Imanol Arias was launched to star status in Spain by his work with Vicente Aranda in El Lute, a film that was a critical and commercial success. Arias came to see his role in El Amante Bilingüe as a turning point in his career, a triumph after two years of relative inactivity. There are similarities between his own life and that of his character: he had a first failed marriage with a rich woman, and was an immigrant from modest background. He recalls that the role in El Amante Bilingüe was an exciting challenge in that he had to play a character with dual personalities and different registers.

El Amante Bilingüe was co-produced with Italian investors, and the role of Norma was given to Ornella Muti, an Italian actress famous for her beauty. Muti first gained attention in the English-speaking world as the princess in Flash Gordon (1980). Here, she played the suggestive role of a wealthy woman with unusual sexual fantasies. Aranda recalled: 'I was very pleased with Ornella; she did as much as she could to adjust to the requirements of the film, but she is extremely beautiful, and perhaps, another less attractive actress might have better suited the dark tone of the film.'

In supporting roles are Javier Bardem, one of Spain’s best known actors, here in one of his first roles; and Loles León, who had appeared in Pedro Almodóvar's Tie Me Up! Tie Me Down! and Aranda's La Pasión Turca (1994) and Libertarias (1996). Maribel Verdú also has an uncredited role in El Amante Bilingüe, as the 'violin girl'.

== Analysis ==
El Amante Bilingüe is a ruthless satire on Catalan linguistic policies, exacerbated by social and class differences. The film is a painful reflection on the human desire to be someone else. The film is clearly marked by its geographical context: the normalization of the Catalan language and the re-establishment of Catalonia as a strong national identity in the context of Spain as a nation. Despite its support from the government of Catalonia, the film frames Catalanization comically, associating popular Catalan culture with xenophobia, anti-immigrant sentiment, and a rescue of self-identity that excludes others. The film portrays Norma ("Norma" also means "(linguistic) norm", "standard" in Catalan and Spanish), representing the intellectual force of Catalan government policies of linguistic change, as haughty, obsessive and cold, while Juan Marés's disfigurement marks his alignment with the culture of his perfidious wife, whom he wants to regain sexually.

The film does not escape the overblown qualities, thin characterization and inherent simplistic sexual politics of Marsé's novel. However, it skilfully points out the layered construction of a second identity, that of Juan Faneca, whose black cloak, wide-brimmed hat, scars and eyepatch stand for a grotesque masculine self-image of sexual predominance based on outmoded forms of seduction. What starts as an unbelievable adventure gradually develops into an ironic criticism of the dual social and linguistic policies of Catalonia. The film is a dark reflection about personal identity and alienation, through which Aranda is also able to make the viewer feel alienated. Aranda became known as a film director skillful in handling erotic scenes. In El Amante Bilingüe, the director parodies such scenes, as in a scene in which Faneca and Norma turn and levitate to express their sexual ecstasy.

== Reception ==
El Amante Bilingüe enjoyed neither commercial nor critical success. According to Aranda, 'The film suffered from the producer's lack of enthusiasm, of which I was aware and which I tried to resolve. Producer Gómez explained, “El Amante Bilingüe was liked neither by the public nor by the novelist, nor even by the actors who made it; I did not like it either. I also think that Aranda was not very happy with the film; nevertheless, we went on to make another movie together.”

Aranda explained: 'I think I did not exaggerate enough. I should have used a cruder brush. Above all, I am not defending my own mistakes. I would have been more satisfied with the film if I had employed an uglier and more extreme style. It was a mistake to center the plot of the film in dialectic between two languages that were so close — Catalan and Spanish. I stated often that the dialectic should have established between English and Spanish, which would have made the film more universal. The plot could have remained the same, just changing the scenery from Barcelona to Los Angeles or New York City and, instead of a xarnego, some other type of foreigner — the rest working the same.'

== El Amante Bilingüe and other Films ==
Aranda often encodes his films with literary references rather than cinematic ones. He explained: 'I wanted to make cinematographic references to The Invisible Man and The Phantom of the Opera, with more subtle quotations of those film through the use of the right photography in an expressionist style, but that idea had to be sacrificed to photograph Ornella Muti beautifully.' Nevertheless, he went on to recall: 'My intention was to make a contemporary film, but with Ramón del Valle-Inclán in mind, and I almost made it. I should have taken things more to the extreme, but I have a tendency to moderation.'

In its baroque and twisted elements, El Amante Bilingüe is similar to the adaptations Aranda made of two of Marsé’s novels, La Muchacha de las Bragas de Oro and Si Te Dicen Que Caí. In its pattern of double identities, El Amante Bilingüe resembles two other films by Aranda, Cambio de Sexo and La Pasión Turca: in Cambio de Sexo, a young man with gender dysphoria is driven by his desire to become a woman; in La Pasión Turca, a housewife with a placid life leaves her former identity behind in pursuit of a new persona with a Turkish lover.

== Awards and nominations ==
The film was nominated for, but did not win, the 1994 Goya Award, for Best Adapted Screenplay.

== Home media release ==
El Amante Bilingüe is available on a Region 2 DVD. The film is in Spanish with English subtitles. Extra items on the DVD include a press conference at the Montreal World Film Festival, a making-of documentary and cast and crew galleries.

== Bibliography ==
- Cánovás Belchí, Joaquín (ed.), Varios Autores (2000). Miradas sobre el cine de Vicente Aranda. Murcia: Universidad de Murcia. ISBN 84-607-0463-7
- Colmena, Enrique (1996). Vicente Aranda. Madrid: Cátedra. ISBN 84-376-1431-7
- Perriam, Christopher (2003). Stars and Masculinities in Spanish Cinema: From Banderas to Bardem. Oxford; New York: Oxford University Press. ISBN 0-19-815996-X
