= If They Tell You I Fell =

1989 film by Vicente Aranda

- Theatrical release poster
- Spanish: Si te dicen que caí
- Directed by: Vicente Aranda
- Screenplay by: Vicente Aranda
- Based on: Si te dicen que caí by Juan Marsé
- Produced by: Enrique Viciano
- Starring: Victoria Abril; Jorge Sanz; Antonio Banderas; Javier Gurruchaga
- Cinematography: Juan Amorós
- Edited by: Teresa Font
- Music by: José Nieto
- Production company: Ideas y Producciones Cinematográficas
- Distributed by: United International Pictures
- Release dates: 17 September 1989 (Zinemaldia); 19 September 1989 (Spain)
- Running time: 120 minutes
- Country: Spain
- Language: Spanish
- Budget: 168 million ₧

If They Tell You I Fell (Spanish: Si te dicen que caí) is a 1989 Spanish film written and directed by Vicente Aranda, starring Victoria Abril and Jorge Sanz along with Antonio Banderas and Javier Gurruchaga. It is an adaptation of the novel of the same title by Juan Marsé, which was based on the killing of Carmen Broto. Set mostly in the old quarter of 1940s Barcelona, the film centers in a young rag and bone merchant who falls in love with a prostitute. If They Tell You I Fell has an intricate narrative in which real and imagined stories blend in a crosswords style.

== Plot ==
In the post Spanish Civil War years, Catalan kids would sit in circles among the ruins and tell stories, known as aventis, open-ended narratives drifting back and forth through time. Laced with horror and perversity, these tales mix war stories, local gossip, comic book characters, fantasy and real events. The aventis of this film are told in flashback in 1970, 1940, 1936 and the mid-1980s.

In 1970, Nito, a medical examiner assistant and sister Paulina, a nurse-nun (who grew up together, and now are co-workers in a hospital) identify the corpse of a couple who had drowned during a car accident. The dead man is Daniel Javaloyes, or "Java", one of the main characters of the aventis of their childhood and adolescence. The woman seems to be Juanita, who forty years before was one of many orphans. The discovery of Java's body (long presumed dead) leads them to remember what had happened decades before. Flashbacks reveal a story that may or may not have happened.

In the old quarter of 1940s Barcelona inhabitants are struggling to survive among the ruins left by the Spanish Civil War. Daniel Javaloyes, or Java, is one of them. He is a young man trying by any means to leave behind the misery around him. He lives in a dilapidated house with his grandmother, a mute trapper. To make some money, the hardened Java performs perverse sexual acts for the voyeuristic pleasure of Don Conrado, a rich sadistic man, who uses a wheelchair after being wounded during the war. In one of those sexual encounters for hire, Java has violent sex with Ramona, a visibly pregnant prostitute. From then on Java is smitten with the fallen woman. Initially he finds out very little about her, but when Conrado's mother visits him also looking for her, Java learns that Ramona had been a maid in Don Conrado's household. She bears a scarred left nipple caused by his sadism.

Marcos, Java's older brother, was an anarchist during the war and now is hiding on the grounds of the family's house. He yearns to see his girlfriend, Aurora Nin, again, whose identity would be blended with Ramona's in the stories told by Sarnita, one of the kids in Java's neighborhood. Sarnita entertains his friends telling them aventis, mixing real events with others that have been invented. Aurora Nin and Java are prominent figures in those stories. Meanwhile, the perverse Don Conrado is directing a religious amateur play about the sacrifice of a Christian martyr. Fueguiña, one of the orphans in the institution where Paulina works, plays the leading role. Java wants to be an actor and blackmails Fueguiña in order to take the part of the devil in the play. Reluctantly Conrado allows him to participate, at least during rehearsals.

Flash back to 1936. During the war, Marcos, fighting for the Republic, takes revenge on Don Conrado's brutality towards his girlfriend Aurora Nin. When the men under Marco's command do not find Conrado, they kill Conrado's father instead. Conrado's mother barely escapes with her life thanks to Aurora's intervention.

In one of his sexual assignments for Conrado, Java has a young man as a sexual partner instead of a woman. He does not back down, but knowing that Ado, the teenager, has been paid twice as much, he follows him to get a bigger share of the money. Through Ado, Java gets involved with a rich jewelry dealer. In him, Java sees the opportunity to escape his poverty-restricted life.

In 1940, Marcos’ old cronies from the war are also looking for him. Still trying secret anti-government plots, they have resorted mainly to criminal activities. Palau, the leader of the gang has chosen his target: Menchu, a bleach blonde prostitute who works for the elite Falangist of the city. To strike them back, Palau and his partners Fusam and Sendra attack Menchu, brutally killing her. When his pursuit of Ramona proves aimless, Java, now sure that Ramona is in fact Aurora Nin, leads Ramona to Marcos's secret hiding place and the former lovers are happily reunited. Taking advantage of a commotion in the neighborhood Marcos and Ramona managed to escape the city.

In modern-day Barcelona, by the mid-1980s, Palau, on a busy street, has a glance of an old couple asking for money. They seem to be Marcos and Aurora Nin.

== Cast ==
If They Tell You I Fell has a large cast headed by Jorge Sanz and Victoria Abril. It was their first of three collaborations under Vicente Aranda's direction. Victoria Abril, Aranda's favorite actress, plays three different roles in the film. She was six months pregnant when she shot the explicit sexual scenes in the film. Antonio Banderas has a small role. Two of the young actors: Juan Diego Botto and María Botto (they are siblings) became very popular in the Spanish screens in the following years.

- Victoria Abril as Ramona / Menchu / Aurora Nin
- Jorge Sanz as Daniel 'Java' Javaloyes
- Antonio Banderas as Marcos
- Lluís Homar as Palau
- Javier Gurruchaga as Don Conrado
- Juan Diego Botto as Sarnita
- María Botto as Fueguiña
- Guillermo Montesinos as Fusam
- Aitor Merino as Ado
- Cesáreo Estébanez as Nito
- Jordi Dauder as Alberto
- Montserrat Salvador as Conrado's mother
- Carlos Tristancho as Sendra

== Production ==
The film is an Ideas y Producciones Cinematográficas production. Producer Enrique Viciano suggested a film adaptation of a novel by Catalan author Juan Marsé to director Vicente Aranda, who had previously adapted Marsé's novel The Girl with the Golden Panties, making it into an art house hit. Aranda was given the choice between Marsé's novels: Ronda de Guinardó and If They Tell You I Fell. He chose the second one. In fact years before Aranda had wanted to make that novel into a film, but found the project too risky due to the novel's intricate narrative and complicated plot. Vicente Aranda wrote the script in the summer of 1987 between shooting his films El Lute: Run for Your Life and El Lute II : Tomorrow I'll Be Free. He simplified the story but kept the puzzling structure of the book. The film was made with a budget of 168 million ₧ and 60 million ₧ aid from the Spanish Ministry of Culture. The film was shot in Barcelona.

Victoria Abril was six months pregnant when she shot the brutal sex scene with Jorge Sanz. She later suffered a miscarriage.

== Release ==
The film screened at the San Sebastián International Film Festival in September 1989 (3rd day). Distributed by United International Pictures, it was theatrically released on 19 September 1989.

== Reception ==
If They Tell You I Fell opened on 19 September 1989 at the San Sebastian Film festival. In Spain it was received coldly by audiences and critics. However Jorge Sanz won Spain's Goya Award as Best Actor for his performance.

The film had a limited release in the United States in New York City. The review in Variety praised the direction, but remarked: "Those with the patience to see this film two or three times, or read the novel by Juan Marsé upon which it is based ahead of time, may understand its convoluted plot. Ordinary film goers will be hard pressed to make any sense out of what they see on the screen."

Ángel Fernández-Santos of El País considered that the film, despite being full of "vigorous images and scenes", featuring "excellently directed excellent performers", and otherwise being "very well edited, beautifully set and lensed", falls apart because of "serious and incomprehensible" mistakes in its writing.

== Accolades ==
Year	Award	Category	Nominee(s)	Result	Ref.
1990	4th Goya Awards	Best Director	Vicente Aranda	Nominated	
1990	4th Goya Awards	Best Adapted Screenplay	Vicente Aranda	Nominated	
1990	4th Goya Awards	Best Actress	Victoria Abril	Nominated	
1990	4th Goya Awards	Best Actor	Jorge Sanz	Won	
1990	4th Goya Awards	Best Art Direction	Josep Rosell	Nominated	
1990	4th Goya Awards	Best Costume Design	Marcelo Grande	Nominated	
1990	4th Goya Awards	Best Makeup and Hairstyles	Chass Llach, Poli López	Nominated	

== DVD release ==
If They Tell You I Fell has been released on DVD in North America twice. It was issued on DVD by Vanguard Cinema in May 2005 as Si te dicen que caí (If They Tell you I Fell), in Spanish with English subtitles. The film was released as Aventis (the film's title in Catalan) by Edi Video in 2006 in Spanish or dubbed English with no subtitles, as the options offered.

== See also ==
- List of Spanish films of 1989

== Bibliography ==
- Cánovás Belchí, Joaquín (ed.), various authors: Miradas sobre el cine de Vicente Aranda, Murcia: Universidad de Murcia, 2000.
- Colmena, Enrique: Vicente Aranda, Cátedra, Madrid, 1986, ISBN 84-376-1431-7
