= The Turkish Passion =

La pasión turca
- Theatrical release poster
- Directed by: Vicente Aranda
- Written by: Vicente Aranda
- Produced by: Andrés Vicente Gómez
- Starring: Ana Belén; Georges Corraface; Ramón Madaula; Sílvia Munt
- Cinematography: José Luis Alcaine
- Edited by: Teresa Font
- Music by: José Nieto
- Production company: Lola Films
- Distributed by: Columbia TriStar Films de España
- Release date: 16 December 1994
- Running time: 113 minutes
- Country: Spain
- Language: Spanish
- Budget: 361,795,907 ₧

The Turkish Passion (Spanish: La pasión turca) is a 1994 Spanish erotic drama film, written and directed by Vicente Aranda adapted from a popular novel by Antonio Gala. It stars Ana Belén and Georges Corraface. The film is an erotic drama, an exploration of female sexual desire. Highly controversial, La pasión turca continues Spanish director Aranda's fascination with the dark side of love. The film became one of Spain's highest-grossing films of the 90s and received twelve nominations to the Goya Awards in 1995.

There is also a 2024 six-part Spanish-Turkish television series loosely based on the 1993 novel of the same name by Spanish author Antonio Gala. The series begins with Olivia, who was played by Maggie Civantos, a Spanish fine arts professor with a distinguished career, who awakens from a coma in an Istanbul hospital following a suicide attempt. The narrative explores Olivia's passionate relationship with her Turkish lover, Yaman, who was played by İlker Kaleli, as well as their involvement in an art smuggling network. The story depicts Olivia's intense passion, which drives her to abandon her life in Spain and engage in perilous activities in Turkey. The first episode was released on March 24, 2024, in Spain.

== Plot ==
Desideria 'Desi' Oliván, a woman from Ávila, Spain will marry Ramiro, a young man from a solid background and promising future. The couple settles into a placid comfortable life. Ramiro is an attentive but not very passionate husband and after five years of marriage, they begin to worry that they still do not have children.

During Ramiro's birthday party, Desideria, her husband and two more couples, decide to travel together to Turkey. While the group is in Istanbul Desi is smitten by the handsome Turkish guide, Yaman. Unable to suppress her passion, Desi begins a passionate affair with Yaman. They have sex in the tour bus, and from then on, Desideria takes advantage of every opportunity during the trip to escape into the arms of her lover. For the first time in her life, she finds sexual fulfillment. After two weeks, the trip is over. Yet, Yaman vows to love his Spanish worshiper forever, and the two part ways.

Upon her return home, Desi can hardly concentrate; her thoughts are with Yaman. Her calm marital life has nothing in common with the torrid passion she found with her Turkish lover. She tries to contact him, but fails on her efforts. After a regular trip to the doctor, she learns that she is pregnant. Yet, it is not her husband's child; he is sterile. Desi is adamant about keeping the baby despite her husband's protest. Ramiro knows that he cannot be the father. She offers to divorce him, but Ramiro agrees to support the child, and the couple decides to stay together. Desi's son does not live long; the baby dies of high fever and convulsions. After the funeral, grieved and stricken, Desi flees for Istanbul, looking to forget the drama she is leaving behind and to be reunited with her lover.

Once in Turkey, she starts to search for Yaman, and she finds him in Capadocia. Yaman is happy to see her again, and together they settle in his modest home in Istanbul. They renew their torrid affair and are happy for some time. But problems soon arise. One day an older woman arrives at the house with two children on her charge. She is Yaman's mother, and they are his children. Only then, Desi finds out that he has previously been married and had children; there have been many women in Yaman's life before her.

When Desi goes to the Spanish embassy to inquire about her immigration status in Turkey, Paulina, a woman from the embassy, offers her advice and friendship. She later warns Desi about Yaman. Paulina knows about him and his reputation is not good. However, Desi strongly dismisses the unrequited advice.

Desi wants to have another baby after the one she lost, but once pregnant, Yaman, despite her protest, convinces her to have an abortion. However, Yaman has her undergo a sterilisation procedure without her knowing.

When he is not working as a tourist guide, Yaman sells Turkish carpets at the bazaar in a family business with his brother. Both of them decide to force Desi to work for them. Besides selling carpets, she would have to provide sexual favors for customers and other carpet dealers. Astonished about this new revelations, Desi, with Paulina's help, flees to Spain.

Back in her country, Desi's friend, Laura and her husband pick her up at the airport in Madrid and take her to a hotel, but she is adamant about the choices she has made and refuses further help from her friends. To try to see what it feels like to be with another man, Desi has sex with Ivan, a man she has just met, but her failure to feel the same she feels with Yaman, makes her go back to him in Turkey.

Yaman is angry with her because she left and beats her. She does not care, wanting only to be with him. Yaman accepts her once again, but their relationship turns even darker. Now, Desi willingly accepts to participate in Yaman's dirty dealings and even has a sexual relationship behind his back, but Yaman maintains his sexual domination over her.

Desi helps Yaman to make amends with another carpet dealer he has tried to deceive. After she sexually pleases the voyeuristic old man, he gives her a small gun as a gift.

Returning home that night, Desi finds Yaman having sex with a couple; Desi cannot tolerate him having sex with another man. Unashamed, he drags them to a bar where a belly dancer is performing. During the dance, Yaman flirts with Desi and the other woman, and Desi shoots him between the legs. Yaman falls to the floor badly hurt, but allows Desi to escape. He orders her to flee but never to return. Desi, carrying her bags, leaves Istanbul for good. A part of her has died there.

== Cast ==
Originally, Victoria Abril, Vicente Aranda's favorite actress, was going to star in the film, but she was unavailable, having gone to Hollywood to make Barry Levinson's Jimmy Hollywood. The role of Desi was offered to Spanish singer and actress Ana Belén, who is better known internationally as a singer; La pasión turca is considered by many as her best movie role. Vicente Aranda remembers, "I was very happy; Anna seemed to me the right actress to play the role." Belén and Aranda became good friends during filming and both remembered it fondly. They would work together again in Libertarias (1995). Georges Corraface plays the role of Yaman, the handsome Turkish tourist guide, whose sexual powers made Deisdera fall madly in love with him. Corraface is a French-Greek actor who has had an international career in film, most notably in Escape from L.A. and Christopher Columbus. He was very happy working for the first time in Spanish. The story and the character of Yaman attracted him, a man he describes as sadly unable to love and hold that feeling. He gets bored and needs to twist this feeling in a perverted way to keep the relationship alive.

Ramón Madaula, a Catalan actor, plays Ramiro, Desi's husband. Sílvia Munt, who won the Goya Award as best actress for her role in Alas de mariposa (1991), took the role of Laura, Desi's friend. Loles León had the small role of a Spanish embassy employée; she had worked for Pedro Almodóvar in Tie Me Up! Tie Me Down! and for Vicente Aranda in El amante bilingüe (1993) and Libertarias (1996).

- Ana Belén as Desideria
- Georges Corraface as Yaman
- Ramón Madaula as Ramiro
- Sílvia Munt as Laura
- Helio Pedregal as Arturo
- Blanca Apilánez as Felisa
- Francis Lorenzo as Marcelo
- Loles León as Paulina

== Production ==
In 1994, Andrés Vicente Gómez, a Spanish film producer, had the idea to adapt to the big screen the popular novel La Pasión Turca, written by Antonio Gala. The year before, Gomez had produced Aranda's movie El Amante Bilingüe, a film adaptation of a novel written by Juan Marsé. El Amante Bilingüe (1993) had been a critical and commercial disappointment; nevertheless, the producer and director were eager to make another film together. Gómez thought that if he had made a mistake with the previous film adaptation, he now was sure Aranda was the right director to adapt La Pasión Turca into a film. Gomez had to convince Gala, who originally wanted Mario Camús to direct the film.

Aranda explained his reason to make La Pasión Turca: 'After making two risky films of little commercial success: El Amante Bilingü and Intruso (1993), I wanted to make a film that would find an audience, and it was like that.'

In the process of adapting the novel to a feature film, there were disagreements between Gala and Aranda; the latter remembers: 'When Gala read the script he said that it was like a tree without leaves. That did stick to my mind, because to think that a telegram has leaves is asking for too much, and a film script is like that.'

Further disagreements arose when Aranda changed the end of the story. In the novel, Desideria commits suicide, while in the film, she leaves Istanbul for an unspecified destination. Aranda explained: 'Gala understood that the story could only have ended in suicide. On the other hand, I am against suicide, I can't help it. I argued that what it seemed to me indispensable, as thesis of the film, was that passion can destroy but it cannot be denied, and my solution eventually prevailed. I filmed two different endings and after several screenings, the producer decided to leave the one I had proposed. When the time came to release the film on DVD, I had the idea to include both endings. Now La Pasión Turca is often transmitted on television, showing the alternative ending.'

La Pasión Turca began filming on May 16, 1994. It was filmed in Turkey (Istanbul and Capadocia) and in Spain (Madrid, Ávila, and Sigüenza) with a budget of 360 million pesetas, and premiered in Spain on December 16, 1994.

Aranda remembers production in Istanbul fondly: 'The shooting in Istanbul was very pleasant for all. We were in a good hotel, everything was very cheap and we used to go shopping to that wonderful place that is the Great Bazaar...we were accused of using stereotypes. What was Turkey for us? Basically, belly dancers. In fact, something similar happens in Spain when foreign directors come here to make films. Showing Barcelona, they present a mule carrying pitchers led by an old man in black. I began to reflect in the unavoidable convenience to used stereotypes as synthesis of element within the narrative.'

The character of Desideria Oliván was based on a real woman even though Gala vehemently denied this. She was a woman from a well-off family from Lleida, married, and during a holiday in Turkey, fell in love with a local man, leaving everything for him. It was revealed to the film crew, during shooting in the Grand Bazaar, that the real Desideria had a store there, selling carpets. In front of the store, she had a Spanish flag and a sign reading 'Catalan is spoken here'. Aranda recalled that out of courtesy, he tried to inform her that a film, slightly based on her life, was being made, but she declined any contact with them. The story shown, both in the book and in the film, is of course very different from the real story, and the real Desidera enjoyed a happy life with the Turkish man she married.

== Themes ==
The film is an erotic drama, an exploration of female sexual desire, a theme that Vicente Aranda explored again with La mirada del otro (1998) but not as successfully. The destructive power of uncontrollable passion and sexual desire also appeared as a theme in Aranda's films: Amantes (1991), Intruso (1993) and Celos (1999).

== La pasión turca and other films ==
In essence, La pasión turca is similar to Aranda's later film La mirada del otro (1998). Both films focus on an independent-minded woman's search for sexual fulfillment, which borders on obsession. Like Laura Morante in the latter film, Ana Belén here delivers a committed central performance. La pasión turca slightly resembles Shirley Valentine (1989), a play adapted into a film, in which a middle-aged, working-class housewife's life is transformed after a holiday abroad.

== Reception ==
The film had its premiere in December 1994. 1,200,000 tickets were sold in Spain alone, and the film made 625 million pesetas at the box office.

Producer Andrés Vicente Gómez recalled the success of the film: "I think Vicente Aranda made a great movie, with the limitation force upon him with a melodramatic novel. He resolved those problems brilliantly. The actors were great, the story was intriguing, and Vicente Aranda took advantage of the location and all the resources he was provided with. La pasión turca was a great success and I was very pleased. All the money I have lost with El amante bilingüe, I made back with this film."

Among critics, La pasión turca has had its fair share of outspoken critics and admirers. The film was highly controversial not only for its many erotic scenes but for having the director change the end of the film from how it was in the original novel.

== Awards and nominations ==
- Two Goya Awards: Best Music Score (Jose Nieto) and Best Production Supervision (Jose Luis Escolar) (1995)
- ADIRCAE Award – Best Actress (Ana Belén) 1995
- Saint Jordi Awards – Best supporting Actress Silvya Munt (1995)
- Fotogramas de Plata: Best Actress (Ana Belén) 1995
- Twelve nominations to the Goya Awards: Best Film, Director, Lead Actress, Supporting Actress, Score, Cinematography, Make up, Production Design, Sound, Adapted Screenplay, Costume Design and Production Supervision

The film was also entered into the 19th Moscow International Film Festival.

== Home media ==
La pasión turca was released on Region 2 in a double DVD set. The film appears on disc 1 while all of the extras are on disc 2. Aside from a theatrical trailer, a TV spot, a gallery of deleted scenes (in Spanish only), photo gallery, filmographies, and making of (in Spanish only), there is also an alternate ending (also in Spanish only) which reinstates the original ending by Aranda reflecting the manner in which the book La pasión turca is based upon ends.

== Bibliography ==
- Caparros Lera, José Maria: El Cine de Nuestros Dias 1994–1998, Ediciones Rialp, 1999, ISBN 84-321-3233-0
- Cánovás Belchí, Joaquín (ed.), Varios Autores,: Miradas sobre el cine de Vicente Aranda, Murcia: Universidad de Murcia, 2000.P. Madrid
- Colmena, Enrique: Vicente Aranda, Cátedra, Madrid, 1986, ISBN 84-376-1431-7
