= Time of Silence (film) =

- Theatrical release poster
- Spanish: Tiempo de silencio
- Directed by: Vicente Aranda
- Screenplay by: Vicente Aranda; Antonio Rabinad
- Based on: Time of Silence by Luis Martín-Santos
- Produced by: Carlos Durán
- Starring: Imanol Arias; Victoria Abril; Juan Echanove; Francisco Rabal
- Cinematography: Juan Amorós
- Edited by: Teresa Font
- Music by: José Nieto
- Distributed by: Warner Española, S.A.
- Release date: 13 March 1986
- Running time: 104 minutes
- Country: Spain
- Language: Spanish
- Budget: P123,528,862
- Box office: P126,000,000

Time of Silence (Spanish: Tiempo de Silencio) is a 1985 Spanish film directed by Vicente Aranda adapted from the novel Time of Silence written by Luis Martín-Santos. It stars Imanol Arias, Victoria Abril and Francisco Rabal.

== Cast ==
- Imanol Arias as Pedro
- Victoria Abril as Dorita
- Francisco Rabal as Muecas
- Juan Echanove as Matias
- Charo López as Charo/ Matias’ mother
- Joaquín Hinojosa as Cartucho
- Francisco Algora as Amador
- Diana Peñalver as Conchi
- Blanca Apilánez as Pilar
- Enriqueta Claver as Luisa

== Bibliography ==
- Cánovás Belchí, Joaquín (ed.), Varios Autores,: Miradas sobre el cine de Vicente Aranda, Murcia: Universidad de Murcia, 2000.P. Madrid
- Colmena, Enrique: Vicente Aranda, Cátedra, Madrid, 1986, ISBN 84-376-1431-7
- Deveney, Thomas G: Cain on Screen: Contemporary Spanish Cinema, The Scarecrow Press, 1993, ISBN 0-8108-2707-7
- D’Lugo, Marvin: Guide to the Cinema of Spain, Greenwood Press,1997, ISBN 0-313-29474-7
- Faulkner, Sally: Literary Adaptations in Spanish Cinema, Tamesis Books, 2004, ISBN 1-85566-098-9
- Schwartz, Ronald, The Great Spanish Films: 1950- 1990, Scarecrow Press, London, 1991, ISBN 0-8108-2488-4
