= Murder in the Central Committee =

Asesinato en el Comité Central
- Theatrical release poster
- Directed by: Vicente Aranda
- Screenplay by: Vicente Aranda
- Based on: Asesinato en el Comité Central by Manuel Vázquez Montalbán
- Produced by: José Antonio Perez Giner; Carlos Durán
- Starring: Patxi Andión; Victoria Abril; Conrado San Martín; Héctor Alterio
- Cinematography: José Luis Alcaine
- Edited by: Teresa Font
- Music by: Manuel Camp
- Production company: Morgana Films
- Distributed by: Warner Española S.A.
- Release date: 16 August 1982
- Running time: 95 minutes
- Country: Spain
- Language: Spanish
- Budget: ₧ 36.778.549
- Box office: ₧ 30.933.857

Murder in the Central Committee (Spanish: Asesinato en el Comité Central) is a 1982 Spanish thriller film directed by Vicente Aranda. It stars Patxi Andión and Victoria Abril. The plot follows a private detective, an ex-communist and former CIA agent, who travels from Barcelona to Madrid to discover the identity of the assassin of the leader of the Spanish Communist Party who was stabbed during a blackout while presiding over a meeting of the party's Central Committee. The film is a thriller with ironic political overtones.

The script was written by director Vicente Aranda. It was based on a book of the same name by Manuel Vázquez Montalbán, one of a series of novels that featured the character of a hard-boiled detective called Pepe Carvalho. It was adapted for the screen the year after its publication. Asesinato en el Comité Central was Aranda's first work shot in Madrid instead of his native Barcelona. The film received a cold commercial response.

== Plot ==
During a meeting in Madrid of the Central Committee of Spain's Communist Party, there is a brief power outage. The lights are back on a few seconds later, but in that short span of time the Secretary General, Fernando Garrido, is killed, stabbed in the chest. The government asks Fonseca, a rabid anti-communist, to find out who committed this crime. Santos, the interim new leader of the Communist Party, calls in a private investigator, Pepe Carvalho. A witty and cynical hard-boiled detective, Carvalho arrives from Barcelona to take on the case. Carmela, a militant communist, is assigned to work as his driver and assistant. Carvalho and Fonseca meet to exchange ideas about the case on which both are working. They utterly dislike each other since in the past, Fonseca persecuted leftists like Carvalho. Their parallel investigations take different routes. Carvalho interviews a former CIA chief who is severely handicapped after losing his arms and legs in Vietnam, but the wheelchair-using old man refuses to co-operate.

Those sharing the podium with the slain Garrido could have killed him only by stabbing him in the back so they are discarded as possible suspects. Because the crime took place in a short period of time and in darkness, Carvalho's suspicions quickly narrow to five members of the Communist Party: Sepúlveda, Esparza Julvé, Pérez Montesa, Leverder and Ordoñez. The detective questions them one by one. Ordoñez, the eldest among them, is quickly discarded by both Fonseca and Carvalho and so is Leverder. While following Leverder to a public reading, Carvalho is seduced by a journalist. This is actually a trap and Carvalho is drugged and beaten by CIA agents who want to know what he has found out, but Carvalho still has no answers to give them. Released by his captors, Carvalho returns to his hotel's room. A central European female agent, working for the KGB, is waiting for him. She is also interested in finding the culprit through Carvalho, who flirts with her.

Sepúlveda has the theory that the killer found his way to Garrido in the darkness thanks to the smoke of his cigarette. However, Santos confirms that Garrido was not smoking when he was killed. Garrido's last photograph and the examination of the items he was carrying when he was killed leads Carvalho to the conclusion that it was an insignia of a harmonica he was wearing on his lapel that helped the killer find his target in the dark. Esparza Julvé, a protégé of both Garrido and Santos, has been experiencing severe economic hardship, and while on a trip to Germany was contacted by CIA agents who hired him to kill the communist leader for money. Carvalho confirms the identity of the killer, forcing the handicapped man to reveal what he knows by filling his mouth with bullets and pushing his wheelchair out into the street among traffic. He whispers the name to Carvalho, after having swallowed the bullets out of fear.

All along, Carvalho has been flirting with Carmela. She invites him to her apartment while her husband and her son are away. As they begin to kiss, they are interrupted by the KGB agent, who presses Carvalho once again about his investigation. At that very moment Carmela's husband enters the apartment, stopping the questioning. Carvalho unmasks Esparza Julvé as the killer. At a new meeting of the Central Committee, Esparza Julvé is cast aside by the members of the Communist Party who are now aware of his culpability. Esparza Julvé tries to leave the building, but he is killed at the door by those who had hired him to assassinate Garrido. Carvalho, with his mission accomplished, heads to the airport driven by Carmela.

== Cast ==
- Patxi Andión as Pepe Carvalho
- Victoria Abril as Carmela
- Conrado San Martín as Santos
- José Vivó as Fonseca
- Héctor Alterio as Sepúlveda
- José Cerro as Esparza Julvé
- Carlos Plaza as Pérez Montesa
- Miguel Rellán as Leverder
- Francisco Vidal as Cerdán
- Aura Maria Rojas as Gladys
- Juan Jesus Valverde as the Major
- María Rubio as Soviet Agent
- Ramón Durán as Mir
- Palmiro Aranda as Ordoñez
- Jack Taylor as CIA agent
- Jorge Bosso as Latin American spy, expert in torturing.
- Carlos Tristancho as Militant
- Rosa María Mateo as Newscaster
- Juan José Otegui as Lecumberri

== Production ==
Murder in the Central Committee was the first film that Aranda made with the production company Lola films created in 1981. One of its owners also presided over the publishing house Planeta which was about to publish Asesinato en el comite central, a new novel written by Manuel Vázquez Montalbán. Aranda had been approached, shortly before, about adapting another novel by Vázquez Montalbán: The South Seas, but he declined. At that time, Vicente Aranda was working in a comedy: Two are company three a crowd (Dos una pareja, tres una multitud) with screenwriter collaborator Carlos Duran, but they could not get the needed financing backing for this project. When the book Asesinato en el comite central was published with popular success, Carlos Duran suggested to make a film adaptation of the novel in the belief that the film would be as successful. Even though Aranda had his doubts, he went ahead with the project. The film was shot in Madrid with a budget of 36.778.549 pesetas. It was made by Morgana films in 50%, Lola films 30%, and Acuarius film 20%.

Aranda was not interested in the political intrigue of the book or in the character of the detective himself. He found the protagonist of the novel very unpleasant: "I detest Carvalho's morals, his cynicism, the use he makes of women.. ". Aranda also added: " He only interest me from the point of view that he drives the narration. Practically nothing happens to him throughout the film, he is watching what happened to others ". Hence Aranda's detective differs greatly from Vázquez Montalbán's Carvalho.

The director's idea was to use the plot as a chronicle of the transition, the period during which Spain moved from Francisco Franco's dictatorship, after his death, until the first free election that put the Spanish Socialist Workers' Party in power. Therefore, the film is framed in this very concrete period." I don't know if that makes the film dated or rather makes it an interesting reportage of its time", Aranda explained. "I have made two films about the transition: one, an intimate story, The Girl with the Golden Panties (La Muchacha de las bragas de oro), the other with a wider scope, Murder in the Central Committee. I am not aware of more films of this period which I find very interesting. There is a kind of collective amnesia about this era", Aranda commented. As in Fata Morgana, Aranda was stylistically influenced by comic strips. He gave the film a different tone from the novel, opting for a mixture of political thriller and a comic strip tone.

Much of the film's action is filtered through headlines and television reports in imitation of the way in which the Spanish public lived the transition. The televised funeral of the Communist leader is a sly montage of mourners at the funeral of Franco, while La Pasionaria (the legendary Spanish Communist leader who passed dictatorship in exile in the Soviet Union) appears as a senile old dear who sits next to the victim but does not even realize he is dead. Like La Muchacha de las Bragas de Oro, this was a film about extremist coming together in a democracy, in this case in order to solve a crime. Whodunnit ? it does not matter. As the interior minister exclaims: In the same way that we’ve had to forget everything, you should to the same”

Aranda omitted all the part that occurred in Barcelona, starting the film with the arrival of the detective at Madrid's airport. Aranda's idea was to portrait Madrid of the transition. The communist leader killed at the opening the film, Garrido, is an alter ego of the then President of Spain's communist party, Santiago Carrillo. The crime is set on the style of the British murder mystery made famous by Agatha Christie. All those present at the congress are suspects. Aranda combines two elements: the detective investigation and the chronicle of a historical period. The story is told from Carvalho's perspective. The director included many comic elements. There were many people who found the film funny, but not the majority.

== Casting ==
The casting of the film was linked to Aranda failed project Two are company three a crowd. Victoria Abril had already been chosen to starred on that project, it was more convenient to move her part from one project to the next. Victoria Abril, on her third collaboration with Aranda, plays Carmela a militant communist who serves as Carvalho's driver. Like in other films directed by Aranda, this minor role was expanded for her. There were not collaboration with Vázquez Montalbán, who was surprised with the selection of Patxi Andion as the protagonist. Jean-Louis Trintignant was who Vázquez Montalbán imagined as Carvalho. The detective has been played previously by Carlos Ballesteros in Bigas Luna's film, Tatuaje, in 1977 and in the series on Spanish television by actor Eusebio Poncela. Aranda chose Patxi Andi for economical and practical reason. Like Victoria Abril, he had been already signed for a project that fell through, and they were just incorporated into Aranda subsequent film.

== Reception ==
Murder in the Central Committee premiered in Madrid on 16 August 1982. It was coldly received by film critics and audiences showed little interest on the film. In addition, it was partially repudiated by Aranda himself. It made only 30.933.857 pesetas at the box office.

== DVD release ==
Murder in the Central Committee is available in Region 2 DVD. The film is in Spanish, without English subtitles.
