= Carmen Broto =

Spanish prostitute whose murder shocked Spanish society in the 1940s

- Born: María del Carmen Brotons Buil; 9 April 1922; Guaso, Aragon, Kingdom of Spain
- Died: 11 January 1949 (aged 26); Barcelona, Francoist Spain
- Cause of death: Murder
- Other names: Cascabelitos
- Occupation: Prostitute

María del Carmen Brotons Buil, more commonly known as Carmen Broto (9 April 1922 – 11 January 1949), was a Spanish prostitute whose murder shocked Spanish society in the late 1940s. At the time of her death members of the establishment were implicated in her murder. Some sources indicate that the speculation that powerful people were involved in her death resulted in an abbreviated inquiry to her murder. Carmen Broto was nicknamed Cascabeles.

== Biography ==
Carmen Broto was born on April 9, 1922, in Casa Pardina de Guaso, a village in Huesca. She later moved to Boltaña to live with her uncles. As a young woman, she moved to Barcelona and worked in domestic service. Quickly realizing that she could not escape hardships as a servant, she turned to prostitution.

Frequenting salons and dances, she came into contact with many colorful characters. This includes Ramón Pané, who housed her in one of his flats and provided her with a monthly allowance for a year and a half. She also met black marketer and owner of the El Águila stores, Julio Muñoz Ramonet, known in the underworld as El Rey del Estraperlo. Juan Martínez Penas, a Galician businessman and owner of the Teatre Tívoli in Barcelona and a Ritz hotel resident, used his relationship with Broto to hide his homosexuality.

Throughout her career, Broto formed connections with many men from Barcelona's high society, some of whom became her protectors. By the end of her life, she was well connected and had amassed a small fortune. She owned a beautiful collection of jewelry, which she often wore in public, both while entertaining men professionally and with her friends. Among the latter group was Jesús Navarro Manau, who ultimately became one of her assassins.

== Murder ==
Jesús Navarro Manau, a seeker of the "good life" with ambiguous sexuality, and his father Jesús Navarro Gurrea, a professional criminal known for his safe-cracking abilities, devised a plan to steal Broto's jewels and break into Juan Martínez Penas' safe. They would get her drunk enough to cooperate, have her lead them to the safe, beat Broto to death, then bury her in an orchard by Guerra's house in Calle Legalidad. The two planned to frame the safe robbery on Broto, hoping the police would not discover her body and believe she disappeared after committing the crime.

On the afternoon of January 10, 1949, Manau called Broto to say he was about to marry his girlfriend Pepita and move to Mallorca, but he wanted to spend one last night partying with her. Broto happily agreed, and the young man went to pick her up in a rented Ford Sedan, along with his friend and accomplice Jaime Viñas.

They visited several bars on Calle Del Rosellón and Calle Casanova. When Broto appeared to be sufficiently drunk, they took her to the car and set off.

Despite her intoxication, Broto did not agree to take them to Penas' safe. As the car passed in front of the Viñas Clinical Hospital, on Carrer Avinyó, Viñas panicked and hit Broto on the head with a heavy wooden mallet. As Broto fought her aggressor, Manau stopped the car, and Broto took the opportunity to escape. She had barely taken a few steps before falling unconscious, and her assailants dragged her back into the vehicle. They immediately drove to the garden in Calle Legalidad, the agreed place to meet Manau's father, checked that she was dead, took her jewelry, and buried her.

The assailants left many clues for the police, including the car full of bloodstains abandoned only a few meters from the orchard. Once the investigators found her body, it was easy to connect the dots. Manau was quickly arrested and soon confessed to the crime. His father and Jaime Viñas both committed suicide by taking cyanide before they could be apprehended.

Manau was initially sentenced to death; however, following pressure from influential people, the sentence was reduced to 30 years. After spending more than a decade in the Ocaña Prison, he was released on the grounds of good behavior, and in 1960 he received a pardon.

== Other versions ==
The newspaper La Vanguardia published articles questioning the police's findings, leading to speculation of Broto's murderers' motives. Rumors circulated that merchants, industrialists, a high-ranking Francoist officer, and even an ecclesiastical dignitary were behind her killing. Others linked the murder to politics, homosexual jealousy, and drug trafficking. The police had investigated based on a robbery, on the orders of the Public Prosecutor. In an attempt to stop these rumors, Interior minister Blas Pérez issued a reporting ban to the press.

Another rumor was spread by Jesús Navarro Manau himself, who went as far as to affirm that Broto was "eliminated" because she was a confidante of the police and an informant for the regime's enemies, responsible for the execution of several people.

== In popular culture ==
The murder of Carmen Broto was the subject of multiple reports, novels, and films. The director and producer Pedro Costa dedicated an episode of the anthology television series La huella del crimen, starring Silvia Tortosa and Sergi Mateu, to the murder.

The event was also fictionalized by Alberto Speratti in his work El crimen de la calle Legalidad (Barcelona, Martínez Roca, 1983).

Juan Marsé was inspired by this crime for the plot of his novel Si te dicen que caí (If they tell you that I fell), adapted for the cinema by director Vicente Aranda.

== Bibliography ==
- Çandar, Başak (2004). Representing Censored Pasts: State-Violence in Twentieth Century Turkish and Spanish Literature (PhD). University of Michigan.
- Cánovas Belchi, Joaquín T., ed. (2000). Miradas sobre el cine de Vicente Aranda (in Spanish). EDITUM. ISBN 9788460704638.
- Llamas, Tomás Gil (1955). Brigada Criminal: actuación de la Brigada Criminal de Barcelona desde 1944 a 1953, contada por su ex-jefe (in Spanish). Editorial Planeta.
- Moliner, Sara (2015). The Whispering City. Little, Brown Book Group. ISBN 9780349139944.
- Montalbán, Manuel Vázquez (1992). Barcelonas. Verso. p. 147. ISBN 9780860913535. "murder of Carmen Broto."
- Trallero, Manuel; Guixá, Josep (2006). La invención de Carmen Broto, o, La deconstrucción de un crimen casi perfecto (in Spanish). Áurea. ISBN 9788493466336.
