= José Luis Alcaine =

Spanish cinematographer

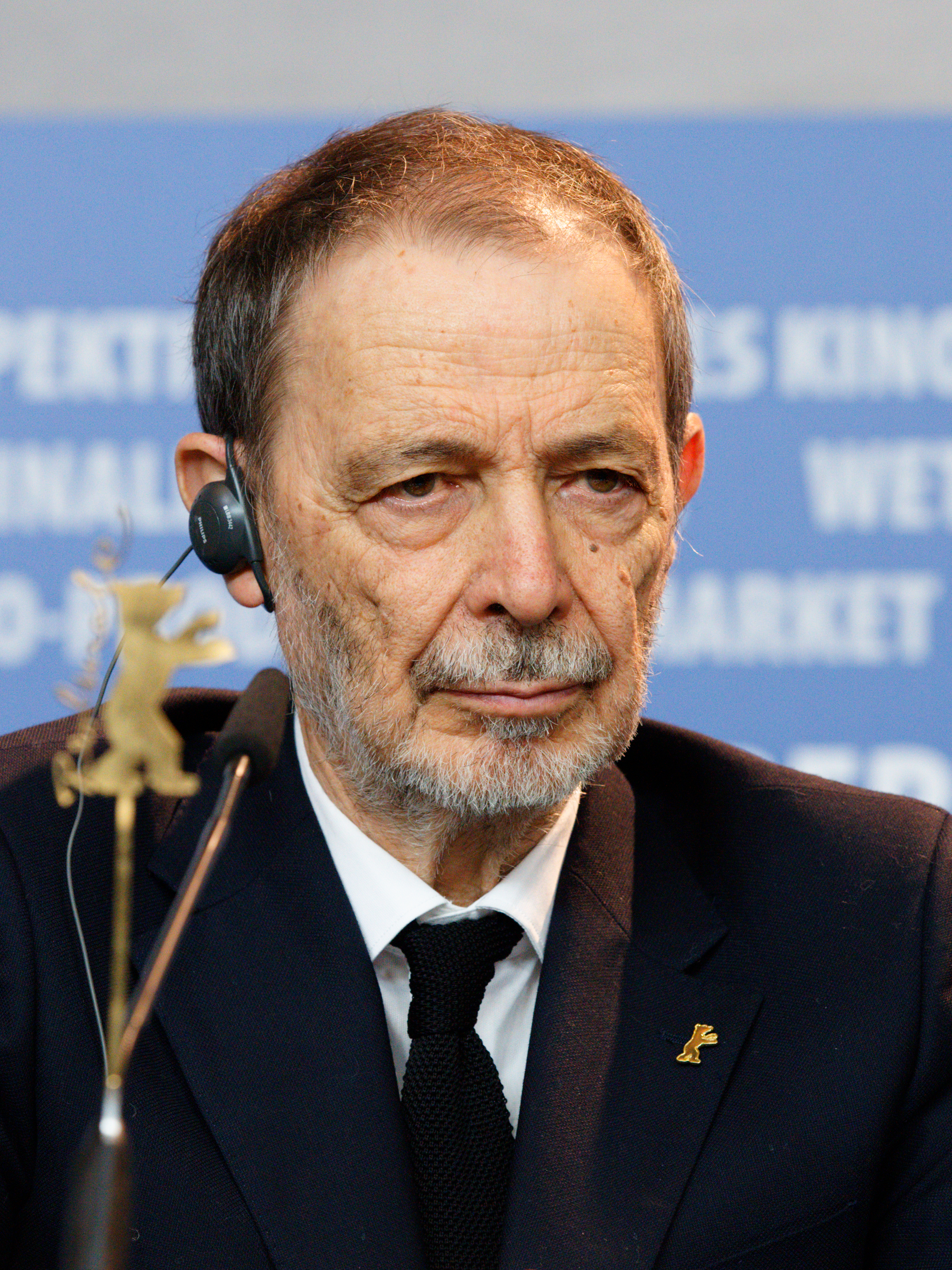
- Jose Luis Alcaine at Berlinale 2017
- Born: José Luis Alcaine Escaño; 26 December 1938 (age 87); Tangier International Zone
- Years active: 1965–present

José Luis Alcaine Escaño (born 26 December 1938) is a Spanish cinematographer.

Educated in Tangier, he was the first cinematographer to use a fluorescent tube as key lighting in the 1970s.

== Filmography ==
=== Short film ===
Year	Title	Director
2020	The Human Voice	Pedro Almodóvar
2023	Strange Way of Life	Pedro Almodóvar

=== Feature film ===
Year	Title	Director	Notes
1967	Javier y los invasores del espacio	Guillermo Ziener	
1967	El hueso	Antonio Giménez-Rico	
1968	Tinto con amor	Francisco Montolío	
1969	Me enveneno de azules	Francisco Regueiro	
1970	Las gatas tienen frío	Carlos Serrano	
1970	El cronicón	Antonio Giménez-Rico	
1973	El niño es nuestro	Manuel Summers	
1973	Corazón solitario	Francesc Betriu	
1974	Vera, un cuento cruel	Josefina Molina	
1974	Yo la vi primero	Fernando Fernán Gómez	With Juan Clemente Prosper
1974	¿... Y el prójimo?	Ángel del Pozo	
1975	La encadenada	Manuel Mur Oti	
1975	¡Ya soy mujer!	Manuel Summers	
1975	Bride to Be	Rafael Moreno Alba	
1975	País, S.A.	Forges	
1975	Sensualidad	Germán Lorente	
1975	El juego del diablo	Jorge Darnell	
1976	Who Can Kill a Child?	Narciso Ibáñez Serrador	
1976	Retrato de familia	Antonio Giménez-Rico	
1976	Los viajes escolares	Jaime Chávarri	
1977	Foul Play	Juan Antonio Bardem	
1977	Las cuatro novias de Augusto Pérez	José Jara	
1977	Adiós, Alicia	Santiago San Miguel	
1977	Gulliver	Alfonso Ungría	
1977	Obsesión	Francisco Lara Polop	
1977	Dios bendiga cada rincón de esta casa	Chumy Chúmez	
1977	María, la santa	Roberto Fandiño	
1978	Red Gold	Alberto Vázquez-Figueroa	
1978	Stay as You Are	Alberto Lattuada	
1978	Vámonos, Bárbara	Cecilia Bartolomé	
1978	Soldados	Alfonso Ungría	
1979	Marián	Luis Martínez Cortés	
1979	From Hell to Victory	Umberto Lenzi	
1979	La triple muerte del tercer personaje	Helvio Soto	
1980	Girl with the Golden Panties	Vicente Aranda	
1980	La campanada	Jaime Camino	
1981	Per favore, occupati di Amelia	Flavio Mogherini	With Giulio Albonico
1982	La próxima estación	Antonio Mercero	
1982	Bésame, tonta	Fernando González de Canales	
1982	Murder in the Central Committee	Vicente Aranda	
1982	Demons in the Garden	Manuel Gutiérrez Aragón	
1983	El Sur	Víctor Erice	
1984	El caso Almería	Pedro Costa	
1984	Akelarre	Pedro Olea	
1984	Tasio	Montxo Armendáriz	
1985	La reina del mate	Fermín Cabal	
1985	Rustlers' Rhapsody	Hugh Wilson	
1985	The Lost Paradise	Basilio Martín Patino	
1985	The Court of the Pharaoh	José Luis García Sánchez	
1985	The Knight of the Dragon	Fernando Colomo	
1986	Mambru Went to War	Fernando Fernán Gómez	
1986	Voyage to Nowhere	Fernando Fernán Gómez	
1986	Half of Heaven	Manuel Gutiérrez Aragón	
1986	The House Must Be Unmade	José Luis García Sánchez	
1987	El Lute: Run for Your Life	Vicente Aranda	
1987	Barbablú, Barbablú	Fabio Carpi	
1988	Jarrapellejos	Antonio Giménez-Rico	
1988	Women on the Verge of a Nervous Breakdown	Pedro Almodóvar	
1988	El Lute II: Tomorrow I'll be Free	Vicente Aranda	
1988	Malaventura	Manuel Gutiérrez Aragón	
1989	Twisted Obsession	Fernando Trueba	
1989	The Sea and Time	Fernando Fernán Gómez	
1989	Tie Me Up! Tie Me Down!	Pedro Almodóvar	
1990	¡Ay, Carmela!	Carlos Saura	
1990	Dancing Machine	Gilles Béhat	
1991	Solo o en compañía de otros	Santiago San Miguel	
1991	Lovers	Vicente Aranda	
1991	Hay que zurrar a los pobres	Santiago San Miguel	
1992	Jamón jamón	Bigas Luna	
1992	Belle Époque	Fernando Trueba	
1993	The Bird of Happiness	Pilar Miró	
1993	Intruder	Vicente Aranda	
1993	Golden Balls	Bigas Luna	
1994	The Tit and the Moon	Bigas Luna	
1994	The Turkish Passion	Vicente Aranda	
1995	Tell Laura I Love Her	José Miguel Juárez	
1995	Two Much	Fernando Trueba	
1996	Libertarias	Vicente Aranda	With Juan Amorós
1996	Tramway to Malvarrosa	José Luis García Sánchez	
1996	Beyond the Garden	Pedro Olea	
1996	Confidencias	Josep Guirao	With Andreu Rebés
1997	In Praise of Older Women	Manuel Lombardero	
1997	My Brother's Gun	Ray Loriga	
1998	Don Juan	Jacques Weber	
1998	Gunslinger's Revenge	Giovanni Veronesi	
1999	Blast from the Past	Hugh Wilson	
1999	Jealousy	Vicente Aranda	
1999	The Lost Lover	Roberto Faenza	
2000	I Know Who You Are	Patricia Ferreira	
2001	Sound of the Sea	Bigas Luna	
2001	Girl from Rio	Christopher Monger	
2002	The Dancer Upstairs	John Malkovich	
2002	António, Um Rapaz de Lisboa	Jorge Silva Melo	
2002	Don Quixote, Knight Errant	Manuel Gutiérrez Aragón	
2002	Nobody's Life	Eduard Cortés	
2003	South from Granada	Fernando Colomo	
2004	Bad Education	Pedro Almodóvar	
2004	The Whore and the Whale	Luis Puenzo	
2004	Roma	Adolfo Aristarain	
2005	The Wretched Life of Juanita Narboni	Farida Benlyazid	
2005	Other Days Will Come	Eduard Cortés	
2005	Life and Colour	Santiago Tabernero	
2006	Volver	Pedro Almodóvar	
2006	Tirant lo Blanc	Vicente Aranda	
2007	Theresa: The Body of Christ	Ray Loriga	
2007	Always Yours	Manuel Lombardero	
2007	13 Roses	Emilio Martínez-Lázaro	
2007	Lolita's Club	Vicente Aranda	
2008	Rivals	Fernando Colomo	
2009	My Life in Ruins	Donald Petrie	
2011	The Skin I Live In	Pedro Almodóvar	
2012	Passion	Brian De Palma	
2012	Picasso's Gang	Fernando Colomo	
2013	I'm So Excited	Pedro Almodóvar	
2016	Altamira	Hugh Wilson	
2016	Wild Oats	Andy Tennant	
2016	The Queen of Spain	Fernando Trueba	
2018	Everybody Knows	Asghar Farhadi	
2019	Pain and Glory	Pedro Almodóvar	
2019	Domino	Brian De Palma	
2019	Salir del ropero	Ángeles Reiné	
2021	Parallel Mothers	Pedro Almodóvar	
2021	Cuidado con lo que deseas	Fernando Colomo	
2023	La voz del sol	Carol Polakoff	
2025	Las delicias del jardín	Fernando Colomo	
2027	El sastre del rey	Pedro Casablanc	

Documentary film

Year	Title	Director	Notes
1976	Canciones para después de una guerra	Basilio Martín Patino	Uncredited
1978	La vieja memoria	Jaime Camino	With Teo Escamilla and Magí Torruella
1983	No se os puede dejar solos	Cecilia Bartolomé; José Juan Bartolomé	Part of the Después de...
1983	Atado y bien atado	Cecilia Bartolomé; José Juan Bartolomé	Part of the Después de...
1992	Sevillanas	Carlos Saura	

=== Television ===
Year	Title	Director	Notes
1972	Plinio	Antonio Giménez-Rico	All 13 episodes
1992	Los cuentos de Borges	Carlos Saura	Segment El Sur
1994	La mujer de mi vida	Jaime Chávarri	Episode "La mujer duende"
2008	Martes de carnaval	José Luis García Sánchez	Episodes "Las galas del difunto" and "Los cuernos de Don Friolera"
2009-2010	Doctor Mateo		38 episodes

TV movies

Year	Title	Director
1980	La balada del pequeño soñador	Antonio Giménez-Rico
1987	Casanova	Simon Langton
2002	Ruy Blas	Jacques Weber
2006	Historias para no dormir: La culpa	Narciso Ibáñez Serrador
2021	Glow & Darkness	Fran Casanova; José Luis Moreno

== Awards and nominations ==
He won the European Film Award for Best Cinematographer for Volver, and has received five Goya Awards for best cinematography.

In February 2019, he received the Medalla de Oro al Mérito en las Bellas Artes.
