= Strangers (1999 film) =

- Theatrical release poster
- Spanish: Extraños
- Directed by: Imanol Uribe
- Screenplay by: Lourdes Iglesias; Imanol Uribe
- Based on: La soledad era esto by Juan José Millás
- Produced by: Enrique Cerezo
- Starring: Carmelo Gómez; María Casal; Ingrid Rubio; Sergi Mateu; Chete Lera; Joan Crossas; Pedro Casablanc; Jesús Cabrero; Soledad Olayo; Ernesto Vañes; Carla Antonelli; Asunción Balaguer; Bruno Bichir
- Cinematography: Gonzalo Fernández Berridi
- Edited by: Teresa Font
- Music by: José Nieto
- Production company: Enrique Cerezo PC
- Distributed by: United International Pictures
- Release date: 9 April 1999
- Country: Spain
- Language: Spanish

Strangers (Spanish: Extraños) is a 1999 Spanish psychological drama film directed by Imanol Uribe starring Carmelo Gómez, María Casal, and Ingrid Rubio.

== Plot ==
Private investigator Goya Lamarca is hired to investigate Sofía's behaviour by the latter's husband after the disclosure of the suicide note of Sofía's mother.

== Cast ==
- Carmelo Gómez as Goyo Lamarca
- María Casal as Sofía Miró
- Ingrid Rubio as Alicia
- Sergi Mateu as Eduardo
- Chete Lera as Marcos
- Joan Crosas as portero
- Pedro Casablanc as Castro
- Jesús Cabrero as Lucrecio
- Asunción Balaguer as Gloria
- Bruno Bichir as Kurt

== Production ==
Strangers is loosely based on the novel La soledad era esto by Juan José Millás. As the script revisions increasingly diverged from the original work, Millás asked not to be credited in the film. The film was produced by Enrique Cerezo PC and it had the participation of TVE. Félix Murcia worked as set decorator.

== Release ==
Distributed by United International Pictures (UIP), the film was released theatrically in Spain on 9 April 1999.

== Reception ==
Jonathan Holland of Variety assessed that the "initially intriguing psychodrama" "falls apart after an hour when labyrinthine mind games start to swamp the action".

== See also ==
- List of Spanish films of 1999
