= María Casal =

Spanish actress (born 1958)

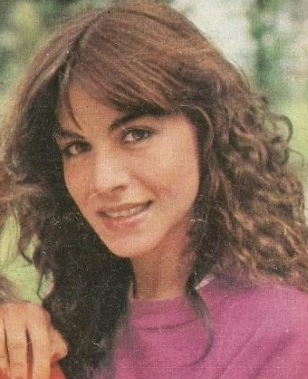
- Spanish Actress María Casal in 1981
- Born: María Consuelo Casal Mínguez; 26 February 1958 (age 68); Madrid, Spain
- Years active: 1969–present

María Consuelo Casal Mínguez (born 26 February 1958) is a Spanish actress. The daughter of actor Antonio Casal, she is perhaps the best known as secretary in Un, dos, tres... responda otra vez and for her roles in television series Hospital Central and Física o Química.

== Personal life ==
Casal was born María Consuelo Casal Mínguez on 26 February 1958 in Madrid. She is of Galician origin through her father, actor Antonio Casal. Her mother, Madrilenian Carmen Mínguez was also an actress. Her father died when she was 16. Casal is fluent in Spanish, English, French and Italian language.

== Filmography ==
| Year | Title | Format | Role | Notes |
|---|---|---|---|---|
| 1969 | Juicio de faldas | Film | | |
| 1976 | El alijo | Film | | |
| 1976 | Colorín colorado | Film | Maruja | |
| 1976–78 | Un, dos, tres... responda otra vez | Television Show | Host | |
| 1977 | ¡Susana quiere perder... eso! | Film | | |
| 1978 | Perro de alambre | Film | | |
| 1980 | La guerra de los niños | Film | Enfermera | |
| 1980 | Hijos de papá | Film | María | |
| 1981 | Brujas mágicas | Film | | |
| 1981–83 | Aplauso | Television Show | Host | |
| 1982 | Los gozos y las sombras | Television Series | Carmina | |
| 1983 | La avispita Ruinasa | Film | | |
| 1983 | Hundra | Film | Tracima | |
| 1984 | Ninette y un señor de Murcia | Television Series | Maruja | |
| 1989 | The Man in the Brown Suit | Film | Anita | |
| 1989 | Primera función | Television Series | | |
| 1989 | Veneno que tú me dieras | Film | | |
| 1994 | Vecinos | Television Series | | |
| 1994–95 | ¡Ay, Señor, Señor! | Television Series | Monja | |
| 1995 | Médico de familia | Television Series | | |
| 1996 | Esto es espectáculo | Television Series | | |
| 1996 | Menudo es mi padre | Television Series | Carmen | |
| 1999 | Extraños | Film | Sofía Miro | |
| 2000–07 | Hospital Central | Television Series | Elisa Sánchez | |
| 2002 | Stones | Film | Martina | |
| 2005 | Munich | Film | Cameo | (Uncredited) |
| 2006 | Magma | Short film | Mujer | |
| 2006 | Tod eines Keilers | Television Film | María | |
| 2007 | Les moreses | Television Series | Cuca Parmenter | |
| 2008 | 700 euros | Television Series | Ingrid | |
| 2008–09 | Física o Química | Television Series | Marisa | |
| 2011 | La que se avecina | Television Series | Reyes | |
| 2016 | El Caso. Crónica de sucesos | Television series | Laura | |
