= El Lute: Run for Your Life =

El Lute: camina o revienta
- Theatrical release poster
- Directed by: Vicente Aranda
- Written by: Vicente Aranda; Joaquim Jordá
- Produced by: José Maria Cunillés; Isabel Mulá
- Starring: Imanol Arias; Victoria Abril; Antonio Valero
- Cinematography: José Luis Alcaine
- Edited by: Teresa Font
- Music by: José Nieto
- Distributed by: Lola Films
- Release date: 9 October 1987
- Running time: 122 minutes
- Country: Spain
- Language: Spanish
- Box office: 2.586.728,38 €

El Lute: Run for Your Life (Spanish: El Lute: camina o revienta) is a 1987 Spanish film written and directed by Vicente Aranda, based on the memoirs of Eleuterio Sánchez, "El Lute", a young convicted murderer who became legendary in Spain for his jail escape in the 1960s. It stars Imanol Arias and Victoria Abril. The film was a hit in Spain and made a big star of his leading actor. It was nominated for four Goya Awards (Best Film, Best Director, Best Actor and Best Actress).

The film portrays the early criminal years of El Lute, and was adapted from his first volume of memoirs, published in 1977 while he was still in prison. The second film, El Lute II: mañana sere libre, continues his story and was based on his second volume of memoirs, published in 1979. Sánchez was paroled in 1981.

== Plot ==
In 1960s Spain, a poor family of quinquis (mercheros), a nomadic ethnic group with a tradition as old as that of the gitanos of Spain and of obscure origins, live as poor nomads. They craft tin goods and repair metal. The son, Eleuterio Sánchez Rodriguez, nicknamed "El Lute", steals some chickens and is condemned to six months in jail.

El Lute moves to the slum outskirts of Madrid with his common-law wife, Chelo. He starts an itinerant life as a peddler of pots and pans, and they live with their infant daughter in a quinqui shantytown. He gradually embarks upon a life of petty criminality. He participates in the robbery of a jewelry store, during which a guard is killed.

The Guardia Civil catch up with him fast. He is arrested again, but even under torture, he refuses to reveal the identities of his partners in crime. The two other suspects were soon arrested. All three are convicted and sentenced to death for murder. A last minute reprieve by General Franco saves their lives in the last minute, commuting the sentence to 30 years in military prison.

Later, while being escorted by two civil guards in a train, El Lute escapes. He eludes a nationwide manhunt for several weeks despite having a broken arm. The Civil Guards eventually track him down and return him to prison.

Thanks to his daring escape from police custody and anti-Franco stance, El Lute becomes a folk hero and symbol of oppression of the poor under Franco.

== Cast ==
- Imanol Arias as Eleuterio
- Victoria Abril as Chelo
- Antonio Valero as Medrano
- Carlos Tristancho as Augudo
- Margarita Calahorra as Chelos's mother
- Diana Peñalver as Esperanza

== Reception ==
El Lute: camina o revienta opened in September 1987 at the San Sebastian International Film Festival; Imanol Arias and Victoria Abril were awarded best actor and best actress. In Spain, the film was a great success with critics and audiences.

== Analysis ==
Director, Vicente Aranda became well known in the 1980s due to his adaptations of literary works to film. For El Lute, camina o revienta, Aranda left fiction and based his film on the 1977 autobiography of the infamous Eleuterio Sánchez, El Lute.

Aranda also adapted El Lute's second volume of memoir, published in 1979, which he released as El Lute II, mañana seré libre (1988) (El Lute: Tomorrow I'll be Free). While in prison, he learns to read, goes on to earn a law degree, and writes five books, two volumes of his autobiography published while he is still in prison.

Forced into delinquency by social deprivation in the 1960s, El Lute is elevated to folk hero by way of his resistance to authoritarian injustice. Aranda's hybrid combination of period drama, thriller and social realism reveals how the authorities manipulated and exploited the criminal career of this petty thief as a diversionary tactic at a time of political unrest in Spain. Employing the motifs of the thriller genre, the film presents the adventures of a man confronted with an adverse destiny and environment, whose desire for freedom leads him to self-education and discovery. The film has a strong realistic and political tone and it is a resounding critique of Franco's regime and its brutal treatment of an oppressed minority.

== Theme ==
The main theme of the films is the powerful individual response to injustice.

== DVD release ==
El Lute: camina o revienta is available in Region 1 DVD in Spanish with English subtitles. The second part, El Lute II: mañana sere libre, is included in the same DVD.
