= Luis Martín-Santos =

Spanish paychiatrist and author (1924 - 1964)

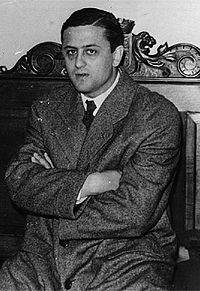
Luis Martín-Santos (1950s)

Luis Martín-Santos Ribera (11 November 1924 – 21 January 1964) was a Spanish psychiatrist and author of Time of Silence, often cited as one of the most important Spanish novels of the twentieth century.

== Biography ==
Martín-Santos was born in Larache, Morocco in 1924; son of the military doctor Leandro Martín-Santos. At five years of age his family moved to San Sebastián, where he would ultimately spend most of his life. He studied medicine in Salamanca and received his doctorate in psychiatry in Madrid, where he developed friendships with specialists such as Juan José López Ibor, Pedro Laín Entralgo, and Carlos Castilla del Pino. At the same time, he became interested in literature and became an habitué of the Café Gijón, where he met many prominent writers of his generation, including Ignacio Aldecoa, Rafael Sánchez Ferlosio, and Juan Benet. He also spent some time with Alfonso Sastre.

In 1951 he became director of the regional psychiatric hospital in San Sebastian and would remain there the rest of his life. He also participated in the so-called "Academia Errante," a debate forum created by restless Spanish intellectuals in the sixties who were searching for new forms of expression. He read Jean-Paul Sartre extensively and became interested in existentialism.

He married Rocío Laffón Bayo in 1953, with whom he had three children. In 1955, he wrote a thesis entitled Dilthey, Jaspers y la comprensión del enfermo mental (Dilthey, Jaspers, and Understanding the Mentally Ill), followed in 1964 by Libertad, temporalidad y transferencia en el psicoanálisis existencial (Freedom, Temporality, and Transference in Existential Psychoanalysis). He became a member of the Partido Socialista Obrero Español (PSOE), a clandestine organization, and was thrown into prison on three occasions. Later, he joined the Executive Committee and became friends with the socialist leader Enrique Múgica Herzog.

Near the end of 1960 he finished writing the novel Time of Silence, which was published in 1962 with twenty censored pages. An uncensored edition was not published until 1981. In this novel he makes innovative use of interior monologue, second-person narrative, indirect free style, stream of consciousness, and mythification; narrative devices that had been pioneered earlier by James Joyce.

His wife Rocío died, possibly a suicide, in 1963. That same year, he began writing Tiempo de destrucción (Time of Destruction), but it was left incomplete when he died in a traffic accident in Vitoria, Spain on 21 January 1964. It was published, as he left it, in 1975. The same publisher had also released a posthumous collection of his short stories, entitled Apólogos, in 1970.

Time of Silence was the basis for the film Tiempo de silencio, directed by Vicente Aranda.

== Works ==
- Dilthey, Jaspers y la comprensión del enfermo mental 1955
- Libertad, temporalidad y transferencia en el psicoanálisis existencial 1964
- Tiempo de silencio
- Tiempo de destrucción
- Apólogos 1970
