= Time of Silence =

1962 novel by

- Author: Luis Martín-Santos
- Original title: Tiempo de silencio
- Language: Spanish
- Publisher: Seix Barral
- Publication date: 1962
- Publication place: Spain
- English publication date: 23 September 1964
- Pages: 222

Time of Silence (Spanish: Tiempo de silencio) is a 1962 novel by the Spanish writer Luis Martín-Santos. An English translation by George Leeson was published by Harcourt, Brace & World in 1964. A new translation by Peter Bush was published by New York Review Books in 2025.

== Plot ==
The novel is about the medical student Pedro, who studies cancer in mice, and his interactions with people in Madrid. An assistant wants to sell the mice illegally. Pedro's lower-class landlady tries to marry off her granddaughter. Pedro has an intellectual friend who achieves very little. Pedro becomes ensnared in a deadly drama when he performs an abortion on a girl who ends up dead. The girl's boyfriend then murders Pedro's fiancee.

== Reception ==
Kirkus Reviews wrote that the novel suffers from too much intellectualism, but that the depiction of Madrid gives it "a degree of power".

== Adaptation ==
The novel was the basis for the 1986 film Tiempo de Silencio.
