= The Naked Eye (1998 film) =

La Mirada del Otro
- Theatrical release poster
- Directed by: Vicente Aranda
- Written by: Vicente Aranda; Alvaro del Amo; Fernando G. Delgado
- Produced by: Andrés Vicente López
- Starring: Laura Morante; Miguel Angel Garcia; José Coronado
- Cinematography: Flavio Martínez Labiano
- Edited by: Teresa Font
- Music by: José Nieto
- Distributed by: Lola Films
- Release date: 20 February 1998
- Running time: 104 minutes
- Country: Spain
- Language: Spanish

The Naked Eye (Spanish: La Mirada del Otro) is a 1998 Spanish film directed and co-written by Vicente Aranda, adapted from a novel by Fernando G. Delgado. It stars Laura Morante, Miguel Ángel García and José Coronado. The film is an erotic psychodrama, an exploration of female sexual desire. It premiered at the 48th Berlin International Film Festival in 1998 where it was nominated for the Golden Bear.

Aranda objects to labeling of his film as an "erotic film", instead he defines it as "psycho-erotic": "[The heroine,] Begoña's ambition is transparency. (...) She wants to enjoy life in its widest expression, and looks for clarity through sex."

== Plot ==
Begoña is a thirty-something consultant who has rebelled against her upper-middle-class background and has overdone it with sex ever since her youth. On recommendation of her psychoanalyst, she keeps a video diary of her encounters using a palm-sized video gadget called "The Owl".

On Christmas Eve, reluctantly, Begoña goes to have dinner with her dysfunctional family: her stern mother, her married brother and her younger sister. Soon, Begoña, the family’s black sheep, clashes with her relatives. She leaves abruptly in disharmony, only her sister seems sympathetic towards her. The same night in a bar, Begoña is befriended by Daniel, a solitary handsome man in his late teens. The attractive and self-assured Begoña draws his attention, but when her on-and-off ex-boyfriend Elio, an adventurous biker, shows up at the bar, an argument ensues between Elio and Daniel.

The next morning Begoña wakes up in her bed with Daniel next to her. Drunk as she was, she does not remember what had happened. They had sex, he tells her, and it was wild. Young, rich and without any real occupation, Daniel starts to pursue Begoña relentlessly, but, although she is flattered, she ignores him. He is far from her only love interest. Besides Daniel and Elio, there is Ramón, Begoña’s coworker and sometimes lover. She is tired of him and rebuffs his advances coldly. Only Ignacio, an older painter, seems to hold her interest. Old enough to be her father, Begoña has been Ignacio’s lover for many years. Although Daniel has followed her to Ignacio’s house, he is not deterred in his interest in Begoña.

When New Year’s Day comes, Begoña goes to a party and gets reunited with her friends from their younger days. The host is Santiago, Begoña‘s high school boyfriend. He is now married with twins, and Begoña wonders how her life could have been that of a traditional wife and mother. At the party, there is also Marian, Begoña's friend, who is married to a much younger man, but is having trouble getting pregnant. On her request, Begoña helps Marian to collect from her husband the sperm she needs for an artificial insemination.

Begoña's spirit of adventure makes her accept the challenge of Elio, her friend and sometimes lover, to go into a rough section of Madrid pretending to be a prostitute. However, once there she is brutally raped by the local pimp, a beefy tall man in drag. After that terrible experience, Begoña looks for a more respectable life. Once again causing a commotion with her family, Begoña marries Daniel and has a child with him. Nevertheless, unsatisfied, one day, she decides to return to the seedy neighborhood where she was raped, looking for more.

== Cast ==
- Laura Morante as Begoña
- José Coronado as Elio
- Miguel Ángel García as Daniel
- Ana Obregón as Marian
- Juanjo Puigcorbé as Ramón
- Miguel Bosé as Santiago
- Blanca Apilánez as Isabel
- Sancho Gracia as Ignacio

== DVD release ==
The Naked Eye has been release on DVD only in region 2. It was released in Spain, but it is currently out of print. It was also released in Italy.
