= El Lute II: Tomorrow I'll be Free =

El Lute II: mañana seré libre
- Theatrical release poster
- Directed by: Vicente Aranda
- Written by: Vicente Aranda; Joaquim Jordá
- Produced by: Isabel Mulá
- Starring: Imanol Arias; Angel Pardo; Jorge Sanz; Pastora Vega
- Cinematography: José Luis Alcaine
- Edited by: Teresa Font
- Music by: José Nieto
- Distributed by: Multivideo
- Release date: 20 April 1988
- Running time: 120 minutes
- Country: Spain
- Language: Spanish

El Lute II: Tomorrow I'll be Free (Spanish: El Lute II: mañana seré libre) is a 1988 Spanish film written and directed by Vicente Aranda, based on the memoirs of Eleuterio Sánchez, “El Lute”, a delinquent who became notorious in Spain for his jail escapes in the 60's. It stars Imanol Arias, Angel Pardo and Jorge Sanz. The film continues the story of El Lute: camina o revienta.

== Synopsis ==
This is the story of a man fighting with all his might for his life and his freedom. Eleuterio ("El Lute") embarks upon an action-packed future, fuelled by the notions of freedom and dreams of living just as his countrymen, ever-growing in his mind. Nothing and no-one can stop him. After escaping the Puerto de Santa María prison, the reunion with his family is just the beginning of what will become an endless escape.

== Cast ==
- Imanol Arias as Eleuterio Sánchez 'El Lute'
- Jorge Sanz as Toto
- Ángel Pardo as Lolo
- Pastora Vega as Esperanza
- Blanca Apilánez as Maria
- Montserrat Tey as Emilia

== Reception ==
El Lute II: mañana seré libre opened in May 1988 at the 1988 Cannes Film Festival. The film was not as successful as the first part.

== DVD release ==
El Lute II: mañana sere libre, is available in Region 1 DVD. The film is included in the same DVD that *El Lute: camina o revienta. In Spanish with English subtitles, the transfer is not of good quality.
