= José Nieto (composer) =

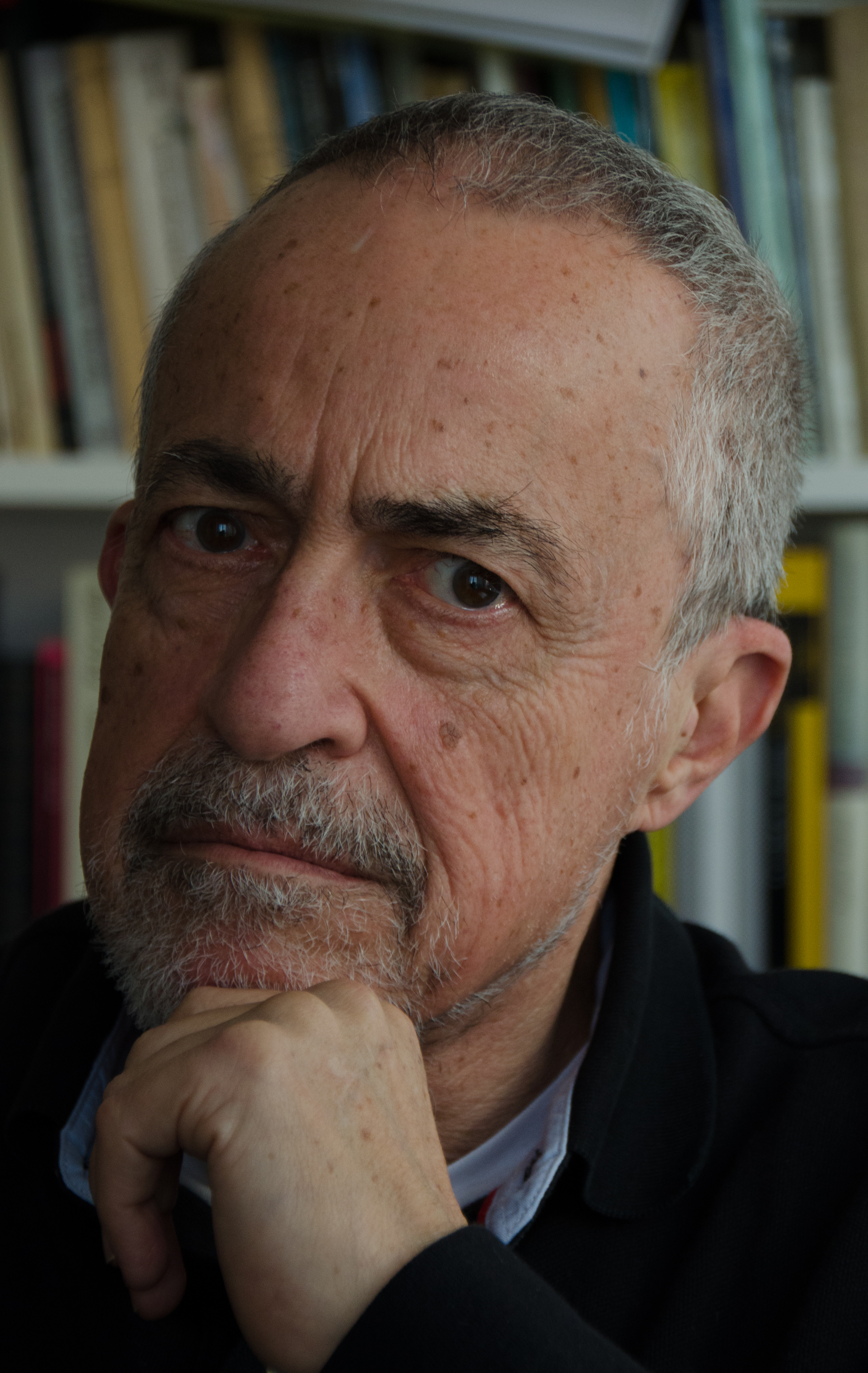
- José Nieto at 75th Anniversary of José Nieto Special Concert. 2018.

Background information
- Born: Ángel José Nieto González; 1 March 1942 (age 84); Madrid, Spain
- Genres: Film score, classical
- Occupation: Composer

José Nieto (born March 1, 1942) is a Spanish composer, orchestrator, songwriter, conductor and drum player. He is best known for writing films scores, such as Mad Love (2001), El bosque animado (1987), The Fencing Master (1992), Carmen (2003), The Turkish Passion (1994) or I Know Who You Are (2000). For television he has composed music for the BBC in series like Crusades(1995) or From the Heart of the World (1990), and other international and Spanish series such as Captain James Cook (1988), Armada (1988), Teresa de Jesús (1984) or Los jinetes del alba.

He has collaborated in theater with Miguel Narros in "El burlador de Sevilla" and "Salomé", with María Ruiz in the "Serrana de la Vera" and "The portrait of Dorian Gray", with José Luis Gómez in "Bodas que fueron famosas del Pingajo y la Fandanga" and in "Life is a Dream", with Adolfo Marsillach in "Los locos de Valencia" and with Josefina Molina in "No se ser ...", among others.

He also has worked in the field of ballet. Her works in this field include "Tres Danzas Españolas", "Ritmos", "Romance de Luna", "Don Juan Tenorio", "Dualia" and "El Corazón de Piedra Verde", all composed for the National Ballet of Spain. For the Andalusian Dance Company he has composed "Picasso: Landscapes" and, on behalf of the Seville Flamenco Biennial of 2012, "Blood Spell", based on Macbeth by Shakespeare.

Nieto has won 3 times the Film Writers Circle Awards, 6 times the Goya Awards for the best music from the Academia of Sciences and Cinematographic Arts, and the Golden Spike at the 41st Valladolid International Film Week. He is the first composer to obtain the National Prize for Cinematography in Spain (2000). In 2001 he received the award from the Academy of Arts and Sciences of Music for the best soundtrack album of the movie Mad Love (Original Title: Juana La Loca) and for Carmen in 2003. That same year he also received the Max Theater Award for the music of "El burlador de Sevilla".

== Life ==
Born in Madrid, Spain, in 1958 he joined the band "Los Pekenikes", playing the drums. He began his career as a professional musician in 1962 in orchestras and jazz dance groups. He made musical arrangements for singers like Massiel, Julio Iglesias or Los Bravos while simultaneously making his own compositions. In 1969 he started to compose film scores with his work in La Lola, dicen que no duerme sola directed by Jaime de Armiñán. He worked for film directors: Jaime de Armiñan, José Luis Borau, Juan Antonio Bardem, Manuel Gutiérrez Aragón and Fernando Colomo. Since the late eighties, Nieto's work has taken greater relevance, especially since he began working with Vicente Aranda in El Lute (1987), a film that would begin a long relationship with the director. José Nieto has also worked for Pilar Miró and Imanol Uribe, among others.

He has been honored with numerous Goya Awards. Since the first edition of the Goya Awards, there has been much rivalry with Alberto Iglesias in the best score category. Until the twentieth edition (2005) they were matched with six awards each, but in the 2006 edition, Iglesias leads when he achieved its seventh award.

== Awards ==
Goya Awards:

- 1987: El Bosque Animado (won)
- 1989: Esquilache (nominated)
- 1990: Lo más natural (won)
- 1991: El rey pasmado (won)
- 1992: El maestro de esgrima (won)
- 1993: Intruso (nominated)
- 1994: The Turkish passion (won)
- 1996: El perro del hortelano (nominated)
- 2000: Sé quién eres (won)
- 2001: Mad Love (nominated)
- 2003: Carmen (nominated)

Film Writers Circle Awards:

- 1974: El amor del capitán Brando (won)
- 1990: El rey pasmado (won)
- 1991: La Luna negra (won)
- 1992: El maestro de esgrima (won)
- 1994: The Turkish passion (won)

National Film Award (2000)

2 Awards MundoBSO

== Filmography (selection) ==
- Luna caliente (2009)
- Canciones de amor en Lolita's Club (2007)
- Tirante el Blanco (2006)
- Los fantasmas de Goya (2006)
- Carmen (2003)
- El caballero Don Quijote (2002)
- Juana la Loca (2001)
- Sé quién eres (2000)
- Celos (1999)
- Extraños (1999)
- La mirada del otro (1998)
- Finisterre (donde termina el mundo) (1998)
- Pasión en el desierto (1997)
- El perro del hortelano (1996)
- Tu nombre envenena mis sueños (1996)
- Libertarias (1996)
- Bwana (1996)
- Guantanamera (1995)
- Crusades (Documental de TV) (1995)
- La pasión turca (1994)
- De amor y de sombras (1994)
- Días contados (1994)
- Desvío al paraíso (1994)
- Intruso (1993)
- El marido perfecto (1993)
- El amante bilingüe (1993)
- El maestro de esgrima (1992)
- Beltenebros (1991)
- Lo más natural (1991)
- Amantes (1991)
- El rey pasmado (1990)
- La luna negra (1990)
- Los jinetes del alba (1990)
- Esquilache (1989)
- Continental (1989)
- Si te dicen que caí (1989)
- Ciudades perdidas (1989)
- El Lute II: mañana seré libre (1988)
- Amanece, que no es poco (1988)
- Nunca estuve en Viena (1988)
- Armada (La armada invencible) (1988)
- El bosque animado (1987)
- El Lute: camina o revienta (1987)
- Monet en España (1987)
- Captain James Cook (1987)
- La guerra de los locos (1986)
- Naturaleza ibérica (1986)
- La reina del mate (1985)
- Extramuros (1985)
- El caballero del dragón (1985)
- El rey y la reina (1985)
- La huella del crimen Tema principal (1985)
- Historias de Pepe Carvalho (1985)
- Mala Racha (1985)
- Orden y concierto cortometraje (1984)
- Truhanes (1983)
- El próximo verano (1983)
- Total (1983)
- Cosas de dos (1983)
- Teresa de Jesús (1983)
- La noche del cine español Tema títulos de crédito (1983)
- Fragmentos de interior (1983)
- Hablamos esta noche (1982)
- Ésta es mi tierra (1982)
- Estoy en crisis (1982)
- Pares y nones (1982)
- 7 calles (1981)
- El arca de Noé (1981)
- La mano negra (1980)
- Escrito en América (1978)
- Las flores del vicio (1978)
- Nunca es tarde (1977)
- Sonámbulos (1977)
- Camada negra (1977)
- Los claros motivos del deseo (1977)
- El puente (1977)
- El monosabio (1977)
- Señoritas de uniforme (1976)
- Jo, papá (1975)
- El poder del deseo (1975)
- Hay que matar a B. (1975)
- El amor del capitán Brando (1974)
- El juego del diablo (1974)
- El vicio y la virtud (1974)
- Un casto varón español (1973)
- Capitán Apache (1971)
- La Lola, dicen que no duerme sola (1970)
