= Juan Marsé =

Spanish writer

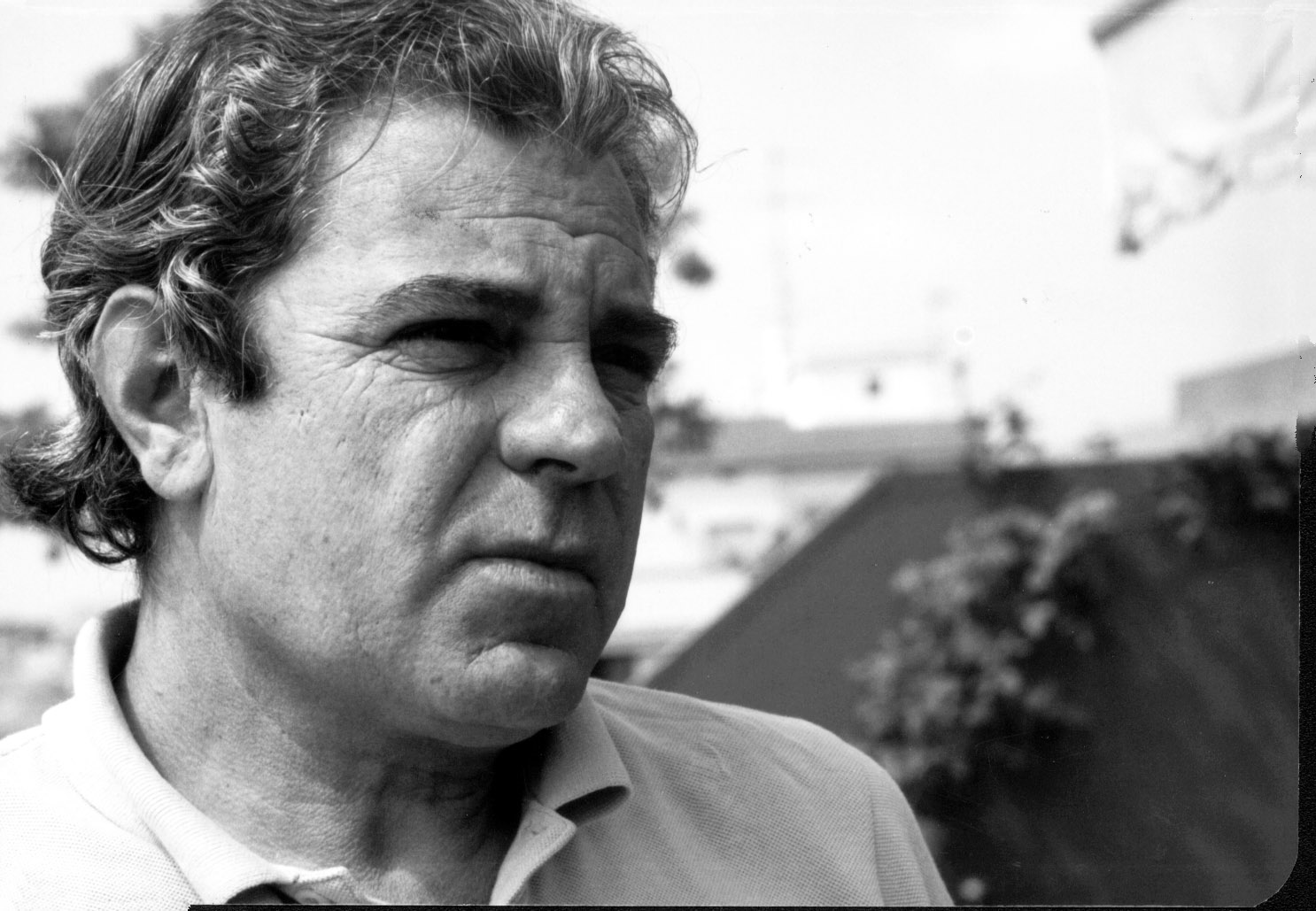
- Juan Marsé in 1991
- Born: Juan Faneca Roca; 8 January 1933; Barcelona, Spain
- Died: 18 July 2020 (aged 87); Barcelona, Spain
- Occupations: Novelist, journalist and screenwriter
- Movement: Generation of '50

Signature
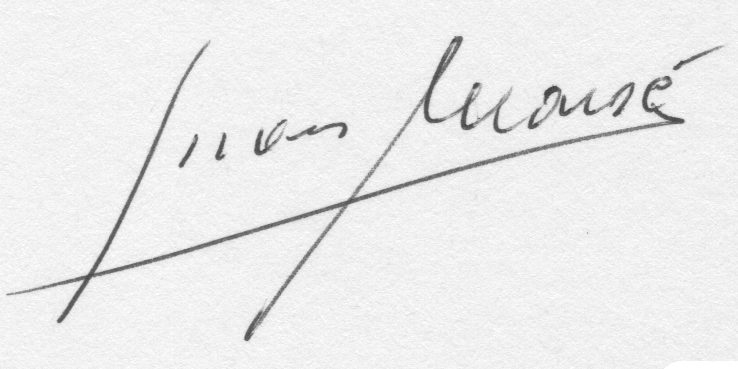

Juan Marsé Carbó (8 January 1933 – 18 July 2020) was a Spanish novelist, journalist, and screenwriter who used Spanish as his literary language. In 2008, he was awarded the Cervantes Prize, "the Spanish-language equivalent" to the Nobel Prize in Literature.

== Biography ==
Marsé was born Juan Faneca Roca in Barcelona. His mother died in childbirth, and he was soon adopted by the Marsé family, taking the name Juan Marsé Carbó.

At age 14, without finishing his studies, Marsé began to work as a jewelry apprentice. He spent some time working in the Barcelonès magazine Arcinema, and began his literary career in 1958 with some stories that appeared in 'Insula' and 'El Ciervo' magazines. His story, "Nada para morir", won the Sésamo Prize, and in 1958 he published his first novel, Encerrados con un solo juguete (Locked Up With a Single Toy), which was a finalist of the Biblioteca Breve Seix Barral Prize.

Afterwards, he spent two years in Paris working as a garçon de laboratoire at the Pasteur Institute and translating screenplays and teaching Spanish. Back in Spain he wrote Esta cara de la luna (This Side of the Moon), which was repudiated and never included in his complete works. In 1965 he won the Biblioteca Breve Prize with Últimas tardes con Teresa (Last Evenings with Teresa).

He married Joaquina Hoyas and began working in advertising and writing dialogues for films. He wrote La oscura historia de la prima Montse (The Dark Story of Cousin Montse), which was not very successful, and Si te dicen que caí (If They Tell You I Fell), based on the murder of Carmen Broto. The latter was published in Mexico due to Francoist censorship and won the Novel International Prize.

In 1974, he started a column in the magazine Por Favor while continuing writing for the film industry. His novel La muchacha de las bragas de oro (Girl with Golden Panties) won the Planeta Prize in 1978, which made him known to the general public.

He wrote two novels about post-war Barcelona, Un día volveré (One Day I'll Come Back) and Ronda del Guinardó, followed by the collection of short stories, Teniente Bravo.

In the 1990s, he received numerous prizes, including the Ateneo de Sevilla Prize for El amante bilingüe (The Bilingual Lover) and the Critic Prize and Aristeion Prize for El embrujo de Shanghai (The Shanghai Spell). In 1997 he was awarded the Juan Rulfo Prize for Latin American and Caribbean Literature. After seven years of silence he published Rabos de Lagartija (Lizards' Tails), which won the Critic Prize and Narrative National Prize. Marsé was the winner of the 2008 Cervantes Prize, the most prestigious award for Spanish-language literature.

MacLehose Press published The Calligraphy of Dreams in 2014.

Marsé died on 18 July 2020.

== Works ==
=== Narrative ===
- Encerrados con un solo juguete (1960, Seix Barral)
- Esta cara de la luna (1962, Seix Barral)
- Últimas tardes con Teresa (1966, Seix Barral), Premio Biblioteca Breve
- La oscura historia de la prima Montse (novela) (1970, Seix Barral)
- Si te dicen que caí (novela) (1973, Editorial Novaro)
- La muchacha de las bragas de oro (novela) (1978, Planeta), Premio Planeta
- Un día volveré (1982, Plaza y Janés)
- Ronda del Guinardó (1984, Plaza y Janés),
- El amante bilingüe (1990, Editorial Planeta)
- El embrujo de Shanghai (novela) (1993, Plaza y Janés)
- Rabos de lagartija (2000, Plaza y Janés)
- Canciones de amor en Lolita's Club (2005, Lumen)
- Caligrafía de los sueños (2011, Lumen)
- Noticias felices en aviones de papel (2014, Lumen)
- Esa puta tan distinguida (2016, Lumen)
- Viaje al sur (2020, Lumen) (phostumous)

=== Short story ===
- Teniente Bravo (1987, Plaza y Janés)
- Cuentos completos (2002, colección Austral, Espasa).

== Film adaptations ==
- The Dark History of Cousin Montse (Jordi Cadena, 1977)
- Girl with the Golden Panties (Vicente Aranda, 1980)
- Last Evenings with Teresa (Gonzalo Herralde, 1984)
- If you say that I fell (Vicente Aranda, 1989)
- The Bilingual Lover (Vicente Aranda, 1993)
- Domenica – adapted from Ronda del Guinardó (Wilma Labate, 2001)
- The Shanghai Spell (Fernando Trueba, 2002)
- Lolita's Club (Vicente Aranda, 2007)
