= Fata Morgana (1965 film) =

- Film poster
- Directed by: Vicente Aranda
- Written by: Vicente Aranda; Gonzalo Suárez
- Produced by: Palmiro Aranda; Antonio Rabinad
- Starring: Teresa Gimpera; Marianne Benet
- Cinematography: Aurelio G. Larraya
- Edited by: Emilio Rodríguez
- Music by: Antonio Pérez Olea
- Release date: 1965
- Running time: 84 minutes
- Country: Spain
- Language: Spanish

Fata Morgana (also known as Left-Handed Fate) is a 1965 Spanish drama film directed by Vicente Aranda starring Teresa Gimpera and Marianne Benet.

The plot concerns a dystopian story set in a deserted Barcelona.

== Cast ==
- Teresa Gimpera - Gim
- Marianne Benet - Miriam
- Marcos Martí - J.J.
- Antonio Ferrandis - El Profesor
- Alberto Dalbés - Álvaro
- Antonio Casas - Luis

== Box office ==
It grossed 1,882,000 ₧ in the box office with 40,053 in attendance.
