= Girl with the Golden Panties =

La muchacha de Las bragas de oro
- Theatrical release poster
- Directed by: Vicente Aranda
- Screenplay by: Vicente Aranda; Santiago San Miguel; Mauricio Walerstein
- Based on: La Muchacha de Las Bragas de Oro by Juan Marsé
- Produced by: José Antonio Perez Giner; Carlos Durán
- Starring: Lautaro Murúa; Victoria Abril; Hilda Vera
- Cinematography: José Luis Alcaine
- Edited by: Alberto Torija
- Music by: Manel Camp
- Production company: Morgana Films
- Distributed by: Warner Española S.A.
- Release date: 28 March 1980
- Running time: 101 minutes
- Countries: Spain; Venezuela
- Language: Spanish
- Box office: €658,676

The Girl with the Golden Panties (Spanish: La muchacha de Las bragas de oro) is a 1980 film directed by Vicente Aranda and released through Morgana Films. It stars Victoria Abril and Lautaro Murúa. The plot follows a middle-aged writer as he is visited by his niece and her friend in hopes to cover a highly fabricated memoir he is writing, and he is caught up in their game of seduction as his lies are unraveled. The film was based upon the novel of the same title by Catalan author Juan Marsé.

La Muchacha de las Bragas de Oro explores the changing nature of a former fascist and is a reflection of Spain facing its past during Franco's regime. The film, a co-production between Spain and Venezuela, exhibits a sexual frankness which was off-limits in Spanish films made before 1975. The film was shot in Sitges and in Barcelona.

== Plot ==
Luis Forest, an aging Falangist writer, has retired to Sitges to devote himself to reviewing his past, ruminating over his failed marriage and writing his memoirs. Suffering from a sense of guilt due to his political past, aligned with the Francoist regime, he lives in virtual isolation in a large house with only his dog and Tesla, the housekeeper, for company.

Luis's isolation is suddenly interrupted by the unexpected arrival of his niece, Mariana. Young and wildly carefree, she claims that she had visited to interview her uncle about his autobiography. Her report will appear in the magazine where Mariana works with her aunt, Soledad, Luis' estranged wife. Mariana has not seen her uncle in many years and she finds that she enjoys his company. She is accompanied by a mysterious, silent photographer, Elmyr, a foreigner male friend. The young couple shake up Luis's staid world. Mariana and Elmyr have a close relationship: they argue frequently, smoke drugs together, and it becomes evident that they are lovers. Spying on them, Luis discovers Mariana and Elmyr having sex. Elmyr paints golden panties on Mariana's naked body.

Mariana's mother, Mari, calls Luis to warn him that her daughter is with Elmyr, whom she describes as a drug addict with suicidal tendencies. She also tells Luis that Soledad has died unexpectedly. There is no need for him to worry about the funeral arrangements since Soledad has already been buried and their four children do not want to see him.

Flashbacks tell the story of Luis during his younger years. He was smitten with both Mari and Soledad. He was at first courting Mari, but one dark night, he had sex with Soledad thinking that she was her sister. The incident eventually led him to marry Soledad. Their marriage was not happy, in spite of Soledad's efforts, and she ended up leaving him. Later on, Mari had a one-night stand with Luis at a time which she was drinking excessively. However, shortly after, she married José Maria Tey, Luis's close friend, and they later had Mariana.

As she offers to type the manuscript, Mariana realizes that her uncle has fabricated and altered several facts and events in his memoir. Slowly, Mariana's taunting and teasing breaks down Luis's barriers and she becomes more interested in him. Elmyr is also revealed to be female, with both Mariana and Elmyr having male lovers whom they bring to the house. One night, while Mariana is out in the town, Luis expels Elmyr from the house after he discovers that Elmyr is a woman, finding her naked having sex with a young man. Mariana is initially very upset by her friend's departure, but calms down knowing that Elmyr is safe in Ibiza. Alone with Luis, Mariana seduces him; Luis succumbs to his niece's advances and they have sex.

Worried about what he might say about her in his memoirs, Mari visits Luis and reveals that Mariana is his daughter, conceived from their one-night-stand. Overwhelmed with guilt for his act of incest, Luis retires to his room and tries to commit suicide by shooting himself, but only manages to wound his hand. As Mariana and Mari go to help him, Luis asks Mariana if her mother told her that she is his daughter; she simply replies, "So what?" as she tends to his wound.

== Cast ==
- Lautaro Murúa as Luis Forest
  - Pep Munné as young Luis Forest
- Victoria Abril as Mariana
- Hilda Vera as Mari
  - Raquel Evans as young Mari
- Perla Vonasek as Elmyr
- José María Lana as José María Tey
- Isabel Mestres as Soledad
- Consuelo de Nieva as Tecla
- Palmiro Aranda as the town's doctor
- Carlos Lucena as the gardener
- David Durán as David
- Mercé Sans as Luis Forest's sister

== Production ==
Director Vicente Aranda had hoped to make a film about the Spanish Civil War, but due to the cost this project would have to wait until when he finally filmed it as Libertarias. Instead, Aranda turned to the new novel by Catalan author Juan Marsé, a controversial winner of the 1979 Premio Planeta ( the Spanish Booker Prize).

La Muchacha de las Bragas de Oro was originally intended to be made cheaply using just a few interior settings. Aranda was able to increase the budget with money from Venezuelan producers and added exterior locations to the script, thereby allowing him to film the action in a calculated chiaroscuro that alternates light and shadow as an illustration of the truth and lies of the protagonist.

== Home media ==
La Muchacha de las Bragas de Oro is available in Region 2 DVD. It was released in Spain in 2015. There is no Region 1 DVD available.
