= Teresa Font =

Spanish film editor

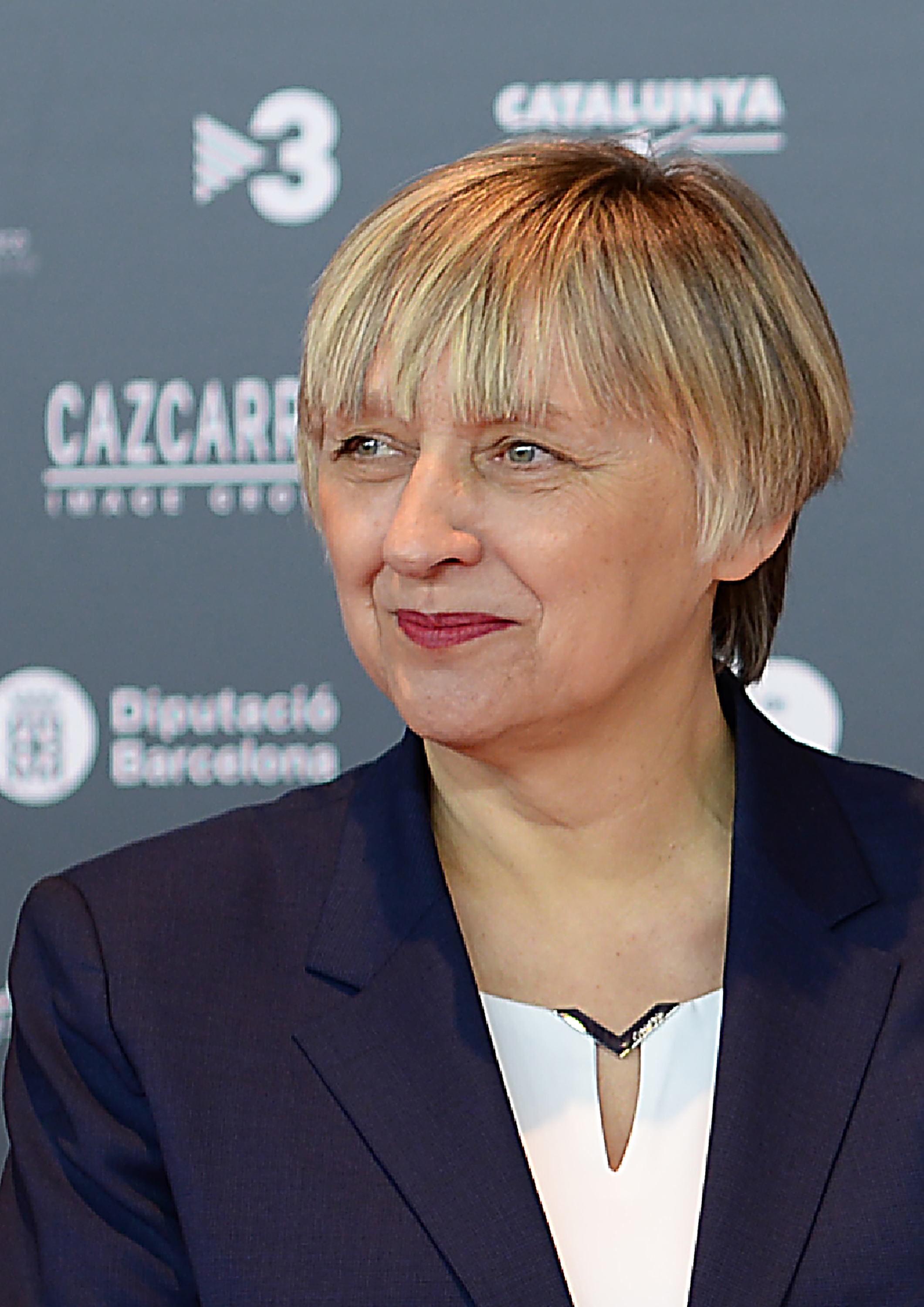
- At the 12th Gaudí Awards in 2020
- Born: Teresa Font Guiteras; 30 March 1956 (age 70); Gallifa, Spain
- Occupation: Film editor

Teresa Font Guiteras (born 30 March 1956) is a Spanish film editor from Catalonia. She is a recurring collaborator in films directed by Imanol Uribe and Vicente Aranda.

== Biography ==
Teresa Font Guiteras was born on 30 March 1956 in Gallifa, in the province of Barcelona.

She become acquainted with cinema as a teenager. She briefly worked as a secretary in Sabadell. She moved to London at age 17, getting to know films by popular directors. Upon her return to Catalonia, she decided to become a film editor. She worked from 1977 to 1988 as editor at TVE, first in Barcelona and from 1984 onward in Madrid. In 1988, she asked for leave from TVE.

She was married to Vicente Aranda, which whom she had two daughters. She was honoured with the 'Ricardo Franco' career award at the 2016 Málaga Film Festival.

== Works ==
- El Lute I: camina o revienta (El Lute: Run for Your Life) (1987)
- El Lute II: mañana seré libre (El Lute II: Tomorrow I'll be Free) (1988)
- Berlín Blues (1988)
- Jamón, jamón (1992)
- Amantes (Lovers) (1991)
- La pasión turca (The Turkish Passion) (1994)
- Días contados (1994)
- El día de la bestia (The Day of the Beast) (1995)
- Libertarias (1996)
- Bwana (1996).
- Perdita Durango (1997)
- La mirada del otro (The Naked Eye) (1998)
- Celos (Jealousy) (1999)
- Muertos de risa (Dying of Laughter) (1999)
- António, Um Rapaz de Lisboa (1999)
- Extraños (Strangers) (1999)
- Plenilunio (Plenilune) (2000)
- Juana la Loca (Mad Love) (2001)
- Piedras (Stones) (2002)
- El viaje de Carol (Carol's Journey) (2002)
- Carmen (2003)
- 20 Centímetros (20 Centimeters) (2005)
- Canciones de amor en Lolita's Club (Lolita's Club) (2007)
- La carta esférica (The Nautical Chart) (2007)
- Luna Caliente (2009)
- Vidas pequeñas (Small Lives) (2010)
- Acantilado (The Cliff) (2016)
- Las furias (The Furies) (2016)
- The Man Who Killed Don Quixote (2018)
- La enfermedad del domingo (Sunday's Illness) (2018)
- Dolor y gloria (Pain and Glory) (2019)
- Madres paralelas (Parallel Mothers) (2021)
- El sustituto (The Replacement) (2021)
- La habitación de al lado (The Room Next Door) (2024)

== Accolades ==
She has won twice the Goya Award for Best Editing: for Días contados and for Pain and Glory.
