= Vicente Aranda =

Spanish film director (1926-2015)

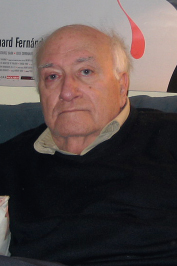
- Aranda in 2010
- Born: Vicente Aranda Ezquerra; 9 November 1926; Barcelona, Spain
- Died: 26 May 2015 (aged 88); Madrid, Spain
- Occupations: Film director, screenwriter
- Years active: 1964–2015
- Awards: Goya Best Director for Amantes; Best Film for Amantes

Vicente Aranda Ezquerra (Spanish: [biˈθente aˈɾanda eθˈkera]; 9 November 1926 – 26 May 2015) was a Spanish film director, screenwriter and producer.

Due to his refined and personal style, he was one of the most renowned Spanish filmmakers. He started as a founding member of the Barcelona School of Film and became known for bringing contemporary Spanish novels to life on the big screen. Aranda was also noted for exploring difficult social issues and variations on the theme of desire while using the codes of melodrama.

Love as uncontrollable passion, eroticism and cruelty are constant themes in his filmography. The frank examination of sexuality is one of the trademarks of his work, as seen in his most internationally successful film: Amantes (1990) (Lovers).

== Early life ==
Vicente Aranda Ezquerra was born in Barcelona on 9 November 1926. He was the youngest son in a large and impoverished family who had emigrated from Aragón to Barcelona twenty years before he was born. He barely knew his father, an itinerant photographer, who died when the child was only seven years old. The Spanish Civil War, in which his family took the side of the losing Republicans, marked his childhood. Thinking that the war was going to be more bearable in a small town than in Barcelona, the family moved early in the war to Peñalba, his mother's native village. The dire situation there, close to the front at Aragon, forced them to return to Barcelona in 1938.

After the war ended, Aranda spent a lot of time in the local movie theatre, much against the wishes of his mother, who took to smelling him on his return for traces of the disinfectant that was sprayed in cinemas of the time. He never finished his formal studies. At age thirteen, he began to work in order to help support his family. He had a number of different jobs in his home town, trying a multitude of trades before following his brother Palmiro to Venezuela in 1952. He emigrated for economical and political reasons. In Venezuela, Aranda worked as a cargo technician for an American shipping business. Later he directed programs at NCR. After seven years, he returned to Spain in 1959.

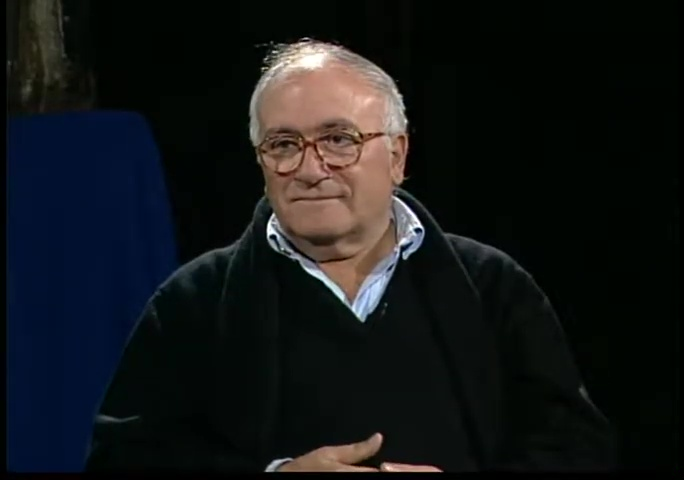
Aranda guests on CUNY TV's Charlando con Cervantes, 1995

Wealthy and married upon his return, he intended to become a novelist, but found that he lacked enough talent as a writer. He fell in with the cultural elite of Catalonia and was encouraged to try his hand at filmmaking. He was not allowed to enroll at the School of Cinema in Madrid because he had not graduated from high school. In Barcelona and completely self-taught, Aranda found a way to direct his first feature film.

Nearly 40 years old when he started directing, Aranda did not gain international success until his 60s. He had a long and prolific career, making 27 films in more than 40 years as a director.

Vicente Aranda married twice. His first wife, Luisa, a name he used repeatedly for the female leads in his films, committed suicide years after they divorced. They did not have children. Aranda's second wife, Teresa Font, was thirty years his junior. She was the editor of his movies since the mid-1980s; they had two daughters together, but separated a few years before Aranda's death.

== Film career and later life ==
=== Early films (1964–1974) ===
Aranda made his directorial debut with the low-budget Brillante Porvenir (1964) (Promising Future), co-directing with screenwriter Román Gubern to avoid problems with the directors guild of Spain. Loosely inspired by the American novel, The Great Gatsby, the film used the aesthetic of the neorealism in a story of a young man from the provinces who tries to make it into the Catalan middle class. Brillante Porvenir, cut by censors, was received coldly by public and critics. This failure made Aranda turned to an experimental form of film making for his next project.

The director's second film, Fata Morgana (1965), an unusual work in Spanish Cinema, is an experimental film, based on a script written with Gonzalo Suárez. The film took inspiration for its graphic visual style from television commercials and comic strips. Ignored upon release, Fata Morgana would eventually be recognized for inspiring the particular kitsch aesthetic of La Escuela de Barcelona (the Barcelona School of Film), an avant-garde movement which sought creative innovation in Spanish films.

In the following years, Aranda's work played between pushing the artistic envelope and using a virtual style drawn from mass media. In these films, Aranda tackled established film genres with an eye on revising and modernizing them.

Since his first features were not widely seen, Aranda produced a commercially oriented film with fantastic and erotic overtones: Las Crueles (1969) (The Exquisite Cadaver). In it, a mysterious woman elaborates a scheme to avenge the death of her girlfriend by a callous publisher. This filmed was plagued with a series of problems: it was long in the making; Aranda suffered an accident during the shooting, which forced him to work from a stretcher, and finally he had a legal battle with the producers. It would take Aranda many years to recover ownership of this film. The experience made him found his own production company: Morgana Film, which produced his next six features.

In La Novia Ensangrentada (1972) (The Blood Spattered Bride), a loose adaptation of Carmilla, a lesbian vampire recruits a young bride to help her seek revenge against all men. A genre film for the cultural elite, it evaded censors by virtue of its incomprehensibility. By Aranda's own admission, he sacrificed conventional coherence for the cinematographic and phenomenological possibilities of each action. The film was distributed internationally in the United States, France and Italy.

Aranda started to use the codes of melodrama with Clara es el Precio (1974) (Clara is the Price), an offbeat mix of melodrama, parody and surreal comedy. He cast Amparo Muñoz, Spain's future Miss Universe, as a naive housewife adrift in a world without taboo. She pursues a career as a pornographic film actress in order to fund a business project for her impotent husband.

This was made during El Destape, a period in Spanish Cinema that had a proliferation of nudity in film under the new social liberties during the political period following the fall of Franco's regime. The Clara film's effort to shock was also its purpose. Like the Surrealists, Aranda's ability to shock was itself a political statement. "We had lived in a state of consensus and this is fatal for cinema", he complained, "We have become our own censors and all we want to do is forget, be silent, not speak."

=== Cambio de Sexo (1976) ===
Following the fall of Franco's regime, social censorship was lifted. Under the new permissiveness, Aranda shot more daring films such as Cambio de Sexo (1976) (Sex Change), skillfully tackling the subject of transsexuality, and using it as an embodiment of the contemporary political transition. This film marks a switch in Aranda's filmography.

He began to use a more realistic style rather than the stylish aesthetics prominent in his early films. Cambio de Sexo also marks the beginning of his long collaboration with Victoria Abril, who became his favorite actress. Over the next three decades, director and star worked together in a dozen films that would include major artistic triumphs for both. Cambio de Sexo dramatizes the development of the destape – the period in the late 1970s and early 1980s Spain characterized by a much more open portrayal of sex in the press, literature and film.

Cambio de Sexo recounts the story of a young effeminate boy, played by Victoria Abril, who lives in the outskirts of Barcelona and escapes to the city to explore his desire to become a woman. The character of the young man is an embodiment of the changes in Spain, with political extremes of uncompromising orthodoxy and unrestrained anarchy. Cambio de Sexo lured audiences with its controversial theme, and it was released to critical acclaim.

=== La Muchacha de las Bragas de Oro (1980) ===
Sexuality and the past, key themes in Aranda's work, are at the center of La Muchacha de las Bragas de Oro (1980) (Girl with the Golden Panties). This was an adaptation of a popular novel by his fellow Catalan Juan Marsé, in which Aranda displayed a more mature style. A Falangist character is writing his memoirs and shapes his past to the new democratic realities. His world of lies falls apart when he is confronted by his carefree niece, who playfully starts a game of seduction.

Always interested in literature, over the next fifteen years, Aranda became Spain's foremost adapter of popular contemporary novels into film. His films have been adapted from short narratives to novels, as well as biographies. His choices usually were guided by the centrality of an erotically defined female character, and a contemporary story emphasizing the force of the milieu on the shaping of actions.

For Aranda, adapting a literary work did not involve complications of faithfulness, or lack of the same, to the original text. For him the novel was a raw material with which to create new forms: " As for adaptations, I feel very comfortable doing them. I don't have a problem with authorship. I don't think I am more of an author if I write a screenplay of something I've read on the newspapers or seen on the street that if I take a novel and make a movie based on its contents".

=== Asesinato en el Comité Central (1982) ===
After democracy was installed in Spain, Aranda made a film politically charged with the aftereffects of Franco's regime: Asesinato en el Comité Central (1982) (Murder in the Central Committee). In this thriller, a power cut interrupts the proceedings of the Communist Congress. When the lights come back on, the leader is found dead, murdered. The film was based on one of a series of novels by Manuel Vázquez Montalbán that featured a hard-boiled detective called Pepe Carvalho. The intrigue runs a poor second to Aranda's commentary on the Spanish transition to democracy. " The truth is that I cannot think of another film that deals with this fascinating period', he stated, there is a kind of collective amnesia about the time".

Much of the film's action is filtered through headlines and television reports in imitation of the way in which the Spanish public lived the transition. The televised funeral of the Communist leader is a sly montage of mourners at the funeral of Franco. La Pasionaria (the legendary Spanish Communist leader who lived in exile in the Soviet Union during much of the dictatorship) is portrayed as a senile old dear who sits next to the victim but does not realize he is dead. Like La Muchacha de las Bragas de Oro, this was a film about extremist coming together in a democracy, in this case in order to solve a crime. Whodunnit ? it does not matter. As the interior minister exclaims: "In the same way that we've had to forget everything, you should do the same."

This was Aranda's first work to be shot in Madrid instead of his native Barcelona. The film was not successful commercially.

=== Fanny Pelopaja (1984) ===
Aranda adapted the popular Catalan author Andreu Martín's noir detective novel, Prótesis. He changed the male protagonist into a female and titled his film, Fanny Pelopaja (1984). The film depicts a violent love-hate relationship between a delinquent woman and a corrupt police officer, with whom she wants to get even.

Co-financed by French producers, the film was made in Barcelona with Spanish supporting cast and crew, and with two French actors in the lead. Dissatisfied with the French dubbing of the film, done without his oversight, Aranda tried to stop the premiere of the film in France. It was released under the title, Á coups de crosse. As a result of this dispute, Aranda sold the film's shares in Morgana Films, the production company he had created. Fanny Pelopaja failed to find an audience when first released, but now has become one of Aranda's best regarded works.

=== El Crimen del Capitán Sánchez (1984) ===
Needing to make some money, Aranda accepted a job to take part in La Huella del Crimen (The Trace of the Crime), a television series consisting of six episodes depicting infamous crimes in Spain. He was one of several renowned Spanish film directors: Pedro Olea, Angelino Fons, Ricardo Franco, Juan Antonio Bardem, Pedro Costa and Vicente Aranda, who were each invited to direct an episode.

Aranda's chapter, El Crimen del Capitán Sánchez (1984) (Captain Sánchez's Crime), was considered the best episode of the series. Made in 16 mm and with a very low budget, the one-hour film tells a story in which incest, jealousy and death mix in Spain at the beginning of the 20th century. The title character is a military officer, who supports his poor family and pays his gambling debts by plotting an elaborate trap to swindle money from those who fall for the charms of his pretty eldest daughter.

=== Tiempo de Silencio (1986) ===
Aranda's career began to soar when he made Tiempo de Silencio (1986) (Time of Silence), an adaptation of the famed Luis Martín Santos novel of the same name. The film had a major cast headed by Imanol Arias, Victoria Abril and Francisco Rabal. Set in the 1940s in the early days of Franco's regime, the plot tells of an ambitious doctor who is accused of killing a woman. But he had tried to save her life after a botched abortion, which was then illegal. The story moves from the sordid lives of the poor in shanty dwellings to the hypocrisy of the middle classes under Franco's regime. Aranda used themes of sexuality to explore political and historical issues. Though the film was criticized by some for his simplifying the narrative complexity of the Martín Santos novel, Time of Silence was generally well received by audiences.

=== El Lute (1987) ===
Aranda took a deconstructive approach to the manipulation of popular myth in his two-part biopic: El Lute: camina o revienta (1987) (El Lute, Run for Your Life), and El Lute II, mañana seré libre (1988) (El Lute Tomorrow I'll be Free), based on two volumes of memoirs by the legendary criminal Eleuterio Sánchez, who had escaped from prison several times. El Lute: camina o revienta (1987) (El Lute, Run for Your Life) concerns the early life of Sanchez, known as El Lute, who claimed to have been forced into delinquency in the 1960s by poverty and lack of education. After an early nomadic period of his life, El Lute moves to Madrid's slums outskirts. He became involved in a robbery and murder; was convicted and, at age 23, lucky to gain a commutation of his death sentence to 30 years in prison. His escapes from jail turned him into a popular folk hero and public enemy number one for the Franco police.

Aranda's hybrid combination of period drama, thriller and social realism reveals how the criminal career and media profile of this petty thief were manipulated and exploited by the authorities as a diversionary tactic at a time of political unrest. El Lute: camina o revienta (1987) (El Lute, Run for Your Life) was one of Aranda's most successful adaptations. It was the highest-grossing Spanish film in 1987.

=== El Lute II, mañana seré libre (1988) ===
In the second part: El Lute II, mañana seré libre (1988) (El Lute: Tomorrow I'll be Free), El Lute as a fugitive became reunited with his siblings. He tries to start a new life, but fails to fit in as a normal member of society. Following his escape from prison, El Lute becomes the focus of an obsessive pursuit by the Francoist authorities. He was the object of massive popular interest by the press and public in the late 1960s and early 1970s.

Compared to Aranda's strongly realistic and political tone in the first installment, in El Lute II, mañana seré libre, he took a more fictionalized, folkloric approach, adopting a more pronounced thriller style. Featuring violence and eroticism, the film delivered a resounding critique of the Franco regime and its brutal treatment of the Spanish merchero and gitano populations.

=== Si te dicen que caí (1989) ===
Aranda made his most sexually explicit film with Si te dicen que caí (1989) (If They Tell You I Fell), adapted from the novel of the same name by Juan Marsé. With a labyrinthine structure in which imaginary facts and real events are blended in a crosswords style, the main part of the story is set in the old quarter of 1940s Barcelona during the early years of Francoist repression. The plot features a young man who, trying to survive in the aftermath of the Civil War, is hired to perform sexual acts with a prostitute; they are to be viewed by a rich falangist rendered crippled during the war. With a large cast, including Victoria Abril playing three different characters, the film was daring and ambitious in its scope.

=== Los Jinetes del Alba (1990) ===
At the request of Pilar Miró, then director of TVE, Aranda took on Los Jinetes del Alba (1990) (Riders of the Dawn) an adaptation of the novel by Jesús Fernández Santos about the Spanish Civil War and the anarchist movement.

Made as a five-part TV miniseries, it features a young woman ambitious to own the resort where she works in a small town in Asturias. When she finally achieves her goal, there is little to rejoice about. Aranda's favorite topics: cruelty, violence and sex pervade this story framed by the tumultuous life of Spain in the 1930s, the uprising in Asturias in 1934, and the Spanish Civil War. This is one Aranda's most paradigmatic works.

=== Amantes (1991) ===
In the 1990s, Aranda continued to make films that were commercial hits at home and were shown at film festivals worldwide. With Amantes (1991) (Lovers), he finally achieved wide international exposure and critical acclaim. This tragic story of forbidden passions and betrayed innocence is a film noir, inspired by real events. In the repressive Spain during the early 1950s, a young man just out of military service is torn between his attraction for the two opposite women who love him: his girlfriend, a naïve maid and his landlady, an attractive, scheming widow.

Originally conceived as a television project, Amantes was made with few actors, a small crew, and with few exterior locations. It is widely considered as the director's most accomplished work, becoming a classic of Spanish Cinema. It marked the beginning of Aranda's most prolific period.

=== El Amante Bilingüe (1993) ===
Still exploring the passion of love, Aranda directed El Amante Bilingüe (1993) (The Bilingual Lover), an adaptation of a story by Juan Marsé. Set in Barcelona, this ironic film mixes Catalan linguistic policies, nationalism and eroticism with a pattern of double identity. The central character is a humble man who falls in love with a beautiful rich woman; they marry but his unfaithful wife abandons him later. After being horribly disfigured in an explosion, he gradually adopts a new personal identity in an effort to lure back his spoiled ex-wife.

=== Intruso (1993) ===
Some of Vicente Aranda films present real events, things that happen on the street but that have had the appearance of the exceptional occurrences, where passion, toughness, and violence manage to acquire a tone of unreality that is almost literary. In Intruso (1993) (Intruder), Aranda takes the theme of the relationship between love and death through a passionate love to its ultimate conclusion. This film is a psychological thriller with his characteristic visual atmosphere and exacerbated passions. A middle-class woman is torn between her love for her spouse and her ill ex-husband, both of whom were her childhood friends. After ten years of separation, they become entangled in a tragic story.

=== La Pasión Turca (1994) ===
Aranda's films feature a woman as the protagonist and the center around which the story turns. La Pasión Turca (1994) (Turkish Passion), an adaptation of a novel by Antonio Gala, explores female sexual desire. A bored housewife from a well-to-do family, decides to risk everything by leaving her husband to return to a lover met while on holiday in Turkey. Her pursuit of sexual pleasure leads her to an obsessive dependence, degradation, and total collapse of her self esteem. La Pasión Turca became one of Spain's highest-grossing films of the 1990s.

=== Libertarias (1996) ===
Aranda returned to the Spanish Civil War in Libertarias (1996) (Libertarians), an epic drama with an ensemble cast that reconstructs the role played by anarchist women during the Spanish Civil War. It is set in Barcelona at the start of the war, where a young naive nun flees her convent and seeks refuge in a brothel. There she and the prostitutes are recruited to the anarchist cause. Together, a group of six women (Mujeres Libres or Free Women) face the perils of war but their idealistic dreams are brutally crushed.

=== La Mirada del Otro (1998) ===
La Mirada del Otro (1998) (The Naked Eye), based on a novel by Fernando G. Delgado, is an erotic psychodrama. Aranda features a woman in her 30s embarks on a quest for sexual pleasure which only brings her loneliness. In this case, the public and critics felt that the plot was sordid to the extent that it overwhelmed the credibility of the characters; it did not do well.

=== Celos (1999) ===
Aranda returned to familiar territory with Celos (1999) (Jealousy), his third work in a trilogy exploring the love triangle, together with his earlier Amantes and Intruso. He created a story about destructive passions that lead to tragedy. A truck driver is tormented by jealousy about the man who was the former boyfriend of his beautiful fiancée. The driver tris to find the man and learn more about their previous relationship.

"Jealousy is at the center of stories of passion", Aranda explained. "To suffer with relish, there is nothing better than uncertainty. A good story demands that audiences share the same doubts than the main characters in the story: whether there is or is not a betrayal. There is always some else lurking and we also know that crime is among us even if it exists albeit only at the bottom of our hearts".

=== Juana la Loca (2001) ===
In the early 21st century, Aranda started to explore period pieces, initiating a trilogy of historic costume dramas with Juana La Loca (2001) (Mad Love), a reinterpretation of the tragic fate of the 15th-century Spanish queen, Joanna of Castile. At a time when royal marriages were made to secure political alliances, she fell madly in love with her husband and suffered from his infidelity. A commercial and critical hit in Spain, the film was the nation's official entry at the 2001 Academy Awards for Best Foreign Language Film. It became Aranda's biggest box-office movie.

=== Carmen (2003) ===
Desire and betrayal, themes that have been recurrent in Aranda's career, are central to the plot of Carmen (2003), a film based on Prosper Mérimée's 1845 novella about jealousy and passion. (This had also inspired the opera of the same name composed by Georges Bizet. Set in Andalusia in 1830, a military officer is seduced by a striking gypsy girl who works in a cigarette factory. His love for her brings his downfall. The film was made with high production values and it was another success with audiences for the veteran director.

=== Tirant lo Blanc (2006) ===
Aranda completed his costume drama trilogy with Tirant lo Blanc (2006) (The Maidens' Conspiracy), an adaptation of a seminal Catalan chivalry novel, written in the 15th century by Joanot Martorell. The plot follows the adventures of Tirante, a knight from humble origins in the Byzantine Empire, who gains the favor of the ailing Emperor by his triumphs in fighting the incursion into Constantinople by the Turks. Tirante later seduces the royal family's only surviving child, a young, fanciful, and impressionable princess.

This is Aranda's most expensive work and was made with a large budget. The film has both humor and drama, is lavish, risqué, and skillfully composed, but it was considered to be superficial and unsatisfying. Tirant lo Blanc did not enjoy the success of the director's two previous films.

=== Canciones de Amor en Lolita's club (2007) ===
Aranda has created a niche in adapting novels by Juan Marsé for film. With La Muchacha de las Bragas de Oro (1980); Si te dicen que caí (1989), El Amante Bilingüe (1993), and Canciones de Amor en Lolita's club (2007) (Lolita's Club), the director has a track record of four adaptations from Marsé's contemporary novels.

Canciones de amor en Lolita's Club (2007) is an erotic thriller, in which sex and brutality are mixed in a story of very different twin brothers. One is a coldhearted, violent police officer; the other is a helpless romantic suffering from a mental handicap. The two brothers become involved with a prostitute who works in the bordello for which the film is named. Released in November 2007, the film was widely considered a disappointment and quickly disappeared from the Spanish screens.

=== Luna Caliente (2009) ===
Aranda's last film, Luna Caliente (2009) (Hot Moon), tells the story of a poet who briefly returns to his home town, gets entangled in a web of sex and violence. He rapes the young daughter of his host. The script is based on a novel by Argentine Mempo Giardinelli, which places the action during the last military coup in Argentina.

Aranda set the story in Spain of the 1970s during the process of Burgos, under which some of the last death sentences in Spain during Franco's regime were executed. Luna Caliente premiered in October 2009 at the Valladolid International Film Festival, but it failed to find an audience.

== Filmography ==
Year	English title	Original title	Notes	Audience
1964	Promising Future	Brillante Porvenir	Co-director with critic and historian Román Gubern	130,012
1965	Fata Morgana	Fata Morgana	Original script written with Gonzalo Suárez	40,053
1969	The Exquisite Cadaver	Las Crueles	Based on a short story written by Gonzalo Suárez	338,695
1972	The Blood Spattered Bride	La Novia Ensangrentada		531,108
1974	Clara is the Price	Clara es el precio	Original script written with Jesús Ferrero	1,013,439
1976	Sex Change	Cambio de Sexo		840,261
1980	The Girl with the Golden Panties	La Muchacha de las Bragas de Oro	An adaptation of the novel by Juan Marsé	795,848
1982	Murder in the Central Committee	Asesinato en el Comité Central	Based on the novel by Manuel Vázquez Montalbán	170,618
1984	Fanny Pelopaja	Fanny Pelopaja / Á coups de crosse (France)	Based on the novel Protesis by Andreu Martín	182,664
1984	Captain Sánchez's Crime	El Crimen del Capitán Sánchez	Made for TV in 16 mm	
1986	Time of Silence	Tiempo de Silencio	Based on the novel by Luis Martín Santos	433,149
1987	El Lute: Run for Your Life	El Lute: camina o revienta	Based on the biography of Eleuterio Sánchez	1,422,188
1988	El Lute: Tomorrow I'll be Free	El Lute II: mañana seré libre	Based on the biography of Eleuterio Sanchez	382,764
1989	If They Tell You I Fell	Si te Dicen que Caí	An adaptation of a novel by Juan Marsé	338,369
1990	Riders of the Dawn	Los Jinetes del alba	Based on the novel by Jesús Fernández Santos. Made as a five-episode television miniseries, it premiered at the 1990 Cannes Film Festival as a two-part feature film.	
1991	Lovers	Amantes	Winner of two Goya Awards: Best Picture and Best Director; Screened at the 41st Berlin International Film Festival	697,368
1993	The Bilingual Lover	El Amante Bilingüe	Based on a novel by Juan Marsé	273,218
1993	Intruder	Intruso		249,087
1994	The Turkish Passion	La Pasión Turca	Based on a novel by Antonio Gala; Entered into the 19th Moscow International Film Festival.	1,240,044
1996	Libertarias	Libertarias		594,978
1998	The Naked Eye	La Mirada del Otro	An adaptation of the novel by Fernando G. Delgado; Screened at the 48th Berlin International Film Festival	107.489
1999	Jealousy	Celos		338,073
2001	Mad Love	Juana la Loca	Based on a play	2,067,004
2003	Carmen	Carmen	Based on Prosper Mérimée's famous novella	1,362,874
2006	The Maidens' Conspiracy	Tirante el Blanco	Based on the novel by Joanot Martorell	296,585
2007	Lolita's Club	Canciones de amor en Lolita's Club	Based on a novel by Juan Marsé	59,308
2009	Hot Moon	Luna Caliente	Based on a novel by Mempo Giardinelli	59,388
