= Libertarias =

- Theatrical release poster
- Libertarias
- Directed by: Vicente Aranda
- Screenplay by: Vicente Aranda; Antonio Rabinad
- Produced by: Andrés Vicente Gómez
- Starring: Ana Belén, Victoria Abril, Ariadna Gil; Blanca Apilánez
- Cinematography: José Luis Alcaine
- Edited by: Teresa Font
- Music by: José Nieto
- Production companies: Sdad; Sogetel; Lola Films; Academy Pictures; Era Films
- Distributed by: Sogepaq Distribution S.A
- Release date: 2 October 1996 (Spain)
- Running time: 117 minutes
- Country: Spain
- Language: Spanish
- Budget: ESP 700 million
- Box office: €1.9 million

Libertarias (English: Libertarians) or Freedomfighters is a Spanish historical drama made in 1996. It was written and directed by Vicente Aranda.

In 1936, Maria (Ariadna Gil), a young nun is recruited by Pilar (Ana Belén), a militant feminist, into an anarchist militia following the onset of the Spanish Civil War. Guided by the older woman, Maria is exposed to the realities of war and revolution, and comes to question her former, sheltered life.

== Plot summary ==
The movie is set in 1936 in Barcelona in the midst of the Spanish Revolution and Spanish Civil War. The film opens with scenes of working class militants demolishing and burning religious icons, as they shout "down with Capitalism!" and "long live the libertarian revolution!" Maria, a nun, attempts to flee the revolutionary violence by hiding in an apartment, not realizing it is a brothel. Pilar, Concha, and Aura, militia women of the "Free Women" (Mujeres Libres), raid the establishment and convince the prostitutes and Maria under their cause.

As Concha helps Charo and the other now-former prostitutes form a committee, Maria accompanies Pilar as she smuggles submachine guns to an anarchist bookstore in Barcelona. After its proprietor, Floren, gives her some anarchist books, Maria becomes an avid anarchist, able to recite the works of Peter Kropotkin at will. One woman (who resembles Federica Montseny) tries to persuade the Free Women to stay and work in defense factories, while men try to convince them to go work as cooks, not front-line soldiers.

The Free Women join other anarchist militias (including the Durruti Column) in the fight to retake Zaragoza from the Nationalists. One night, a militiawoman claims to be the voice of Mateo Morral and speaks of a strongbox, dynamite, and a detonator. Maria uses this information to locate a chest full of dynamite. Along the way, she meets an ex-priest and asks him to give her the Sacrament of Penance. He rejects her request and silences her when she begins praying by kissing her. The militia storms a Nationalist parapet, using the dynamite as a part of trap. The anarchist militias successfully captures San Roman, at one point using an armored car to break through a barricade.

During a funeral for one of the militia leaders killed during the assault, the ex-priest attempts to persuade Maria to marry him, but she rejects his proposal. After a gynecology exam shows that many of the militiawomen are pregnant or sick with gonorrhea, the ex-priest is ordered to persuade the militiawomen to leave the front. Several of them, Maria included, reject the proposal.

Suddenly, Nationalist troops, accompanied by Regulares, attack the town. One of the Regulares slits Charo's wrists, while another stabs Floren in the stomach after a bloody struggle. They then rape Maria at knifepoint, until one of their officers intervenes. The Nationalists capture the town, placing it under strict curfew and martial law, and take Maria and other milita members prisoner. While in prison, Maria encounters Pilar, whose throat has been slit. Maria comforts her as she dies, prophesying of an anarchist paradise, blessed by God, free of exploitation and misery.

== Cast and characters ==
- María (Ariadna Gil) is a young, sheltered woman. She is swept into the confusion and euphoria of the initial days of the Spanish Civil War, when her convent is overrun by anarchist militiamen. Fearing for her life, as she believes the men mean her harm, she seeks refuge amongst the back alleys of the city, only to be given shelter in a brothel. Minutes later, the same building is stormed by militia-women, and the stern-faced Pilar. When the brothel is closed, Maria is left with nowhere to go. Fearing for her safety, she stays by Pilar's side, hoping the stronger woman can shield her from the realities of a war, and a social revolution that Maria does not understand. Overtime she comes to sympathize with the anarchists who she has joined, blending her own beliefs of heaven and paradise with an anarchist desire for a communal society founded on liberation. Though she never picks up a gun for their cause, she ultimately becomes strong enough for a final reversal of roles, as she gives shelter to Pilar in the final moments of the movie.
- Pilar (Ana Belén) is a confident anarcha-feminist, Mujeres Libres member, and militia soldier. She is a constant source of strength for the characters around her, and a protector of the naive María. After convincing the prostitutes of a brothel to turn their backs on their old lives and become militia soldiers, she takes Maria under her wing, fearing the shy girl will only be in danger as a Catholic in a newly minted anti-theistic anarchist society. Disguising the girl as a fellow anarchist, she takes Maria as a ward and leads a small troop of militia soldiers into battle against the forces of Franco.
- Victoria Abril as Floren
- Blanca Apilánez as Aura
- Laura Mañá as Concha
- Loles León as Charo
- Jorge Sanz as Obrero Hijo
- José Sancho as Obrero padre
- Joan Crosas as Boina
- Antonio Dechent as Faneca

== Reception ==
Time Out stated that the movie "deserves praise for its feminist perspective on the course of the 1936-7 revolution, when women's liberation was a logical, if hardly well-recognised, constituent of the libertarian ideals that the Spanish working class rose up to assert."

It was the third highest-grossing Spanish film of the year.

== See also ==
- Anarchism in Spain
- Anarcha-feminism
- Militant anti-fascism
- Mujeres Libres
