= List of Spanish films of 1999 =

A list of Spanish-produced and co-produced feature films released in Spain in 1999. When applicable, the domestic theatrical release date is favoured.

== Films ==
Release		Title (Native title)	Cast & Crew	Ref.
J A N U A R Y	8	Finisterre	Director: Xavier Villaverde Cast: Elena Anaya, Nancho Novo, Enrique Alcides, Geraldine Chaplin, Chete Lera, Manuel Manquiña	
J A N U A R Y	22	Between Your Legs (Entre las piernas)	Director: Manuel Gómez Pereira Cast: Victoria Abril, Javier Bardem, Carmelo Gómez	
F E B R U A R Y	26	Black Tears (Lágrimas negras)	Director: Ricardo Franco, Fernando Bauluz Cast: Ariadna Gil, Fele Martínez, Elena Anaya, Ana Risueño, Elvira Mínguez	
F E B R U A R Y	26	Yerma	Director: Pilar Távora Cast: Aitana Sánchez-Gijón, Juan Diego, Irene Papas	
M A R C H	5	Alone (Solas)	Director: Benito Zambrano Cast: María Galiana, Ana Fernández, Carlos Álvarez, Antonio Dechent	
M A R C H	12	Dying of Laughter (Muertos de risa)	Director: Álex de la Iglesia Cast: Santiago Segura, El Gran Wyoming, Álex Angulo, Carla Hidalgo	
A P R I L	9	Strangers (Extraños)	Director: Imanol Uribe Cast: Carmelo Gómez, María Casal, Ingrid Rubio, Sergi Mateu, Chete Lera, Joan Crosas, Asunción Balaguer, Bruno Bichir, Pedro Casablanc	
A P R I L	16	All About My Mother (Todo sobre mi madre)	Director: Pedro Almodóvar Cast: Cecilia Roth, Marisa Paredes, Penélope Cruz, Candela Peña, Antonia San Juan, Rosa María Sardá, Fernando Fernán Gómez, Fernando Guillén, Toni Cantó, Eloy Azorín, Carlos Lozano	
A P R I L	30	The Yellow Fountain (La fuente amarilla)	Director: Miguel Santesmases Cast: Eduardo Noriega, Silvia Abascal	
M A Y	28	The City of Marvels (La ciudad de los prodigios)	Director: Mario Camus Cast: Olivier Martinez, Emma Suárez, François Marthouret	
J U N E	25	Manolito Four Eyes (Manolito Gafotas)	Director: Miguel Albaladejo Cast: David Sánchez del Rey, Adriana Ozores, Roberto Álvarez, Antonio Gamero, Alejandro Martínez	
J U L Y	23	Lisbon (Lisboa)	Director: Antonio Hernández Cast: Carmen Maura, Federico Luppi, Sergi López, Antonio Birabent, Laia Marull, Miguel Palenzuela	
A U G U S T	6	Zapping	Director: Juan Manuel Chumilla Carbajosa Cast: Alberto San Juan, Natalia Dicenta, Paz Vega, Eduard Fernández	
A U G U S T	27	Washington Wolves (Los lobos de Washington)	Director: Mariano Barroso Cast: Javier Bardem, Eduard Fernández, Ernesto Alterio, Alberto San Juan, José Sancho	
S E P T E M B E R	3	Jealousy (Celos)	Director: Vicente Aranda Cast: Aitana Sánchez-Gijón, Daniel Giménez Cacho, María Botto, Luis Tosar	
S E P T E M B E R	10	Shacky Carmine	Director: Chema de la Peña Cast: Fernando Cayo, Andrés Gertrúdix, Rebeca Jiménez, Pau Cólera, Manolo Caro	
S E P T E M B E R	17	Couples (Novios)	Director: Joaquín Oristrell Cast: Juanjo Puigcorbé, Candela Peña, Juan Diego Botto, María Barranco, Karra Elejalde	
S E P T E M B E R	24	Butterfly's Tongue (La lengua de las mariposas)	Director: José Luis Cuerda Cast: Fernando Fernán Gómez, Manuel Lozano	
S E P T E M B E R	24	A Sweet Scent of Death (Un dulce olor a muerte)	Director: Gabriel Retes Cast: Karra Elejalde, Ana Álvarez, Héctor Alterio, Diego Luna	(Note: Co-production Spain–Mexico–Argentina (40%–40%–20%).)
O C T O B E R	1	Volavérunt	Director: Bigas Luna Cast: Aitana Sánchez-Gijón, Penélope Cruz, Jordi Mollà, Jorge Perugorría, Stefania Sandrelli	
O C T O B E R	9	By My Side Again (Cuando vuelvas a mi lado)	Director: Gracia Querejeta Cast: Mercedes Sampietro, Julieta Serrano, Adriana Ozores, Marta Belaustegui, Rosa Mariscal, Jorge Perugorría	
N O V E M B E R	5	The Ugliest Woman in the World (La mujer más fea del mundo)	Director: Miguel Bardem Cast: Elia Galera, Roberto Álvarez, Héctor Alterio, Javivi, Guillermo Toledo, Enrique Villén, Pablo Pinedo, Alberto San Juan	
N O V E M B E R	12	Goya in Bordeaux (Goya en Burdeos)	Director: Carlos Saura Cast: Francisco Rabal, José Coronado, Maribel Verdú, Eulàlia Ramon, Dafne Fernández, Josep Maria Pou, Saturnino García, Joaquín Climent, Cristina Espinosa	
N O V E M B E R	12	The Nameless (Los sin nombre)	Director: Jaume Balagueró Cast: Emma Vilarasau, Karra Elejalde, Tristán Ulloa	
N O V E M B E R	19	I Will Survive (Sobreviviré)	Director: Alfonso Albacete & David Menkes Cast: Emma Suárez, Juan Diego Botto, Mirtha Ibarra, Rosana Pastor, Manuel Manquiña, Maite Blasco, Àlex Brendemühl, Javier Martín, Adriá Collado, Elena Irureta, Alberto San Juan, José Manuel Cervino	
N O V E M B E R	19	Fading Memories (Las huellas borradas)	Director: Enrique Gabriel Cast: Federico Luppi, Mercedes Sampietro, Elena Anaya, Héctor Alterio	
N O V E M B E R	26	Nobody Knows Anybody (Nadie conoce a nadie)	Director: Mateo Gil Cast: Eduardo Noriega, Jordi Mollá, Natalia Verbeke, Paz Vega	

== Box office ==
The ten highest-grossing Spanish films in 1999, by domestic box office gross revenue, are as follows:

Highest-grossing films of 1999
Rank	Title	Distributor	Admissions	Domestic gross (€)
1	All About My Mother (Todo sobre mi madre)	Warner Sogefilms	1,908,819	7,336,553
2	Dying of Laughter (Muertos de risa)	Lolafilms	1,668,694	6,298,063
3	The Ninth Gate (La novena puerta)	Kino Vision	1,311,140	4,990,314
4	The Girl of Your Dreams (La niña de tus ojos)	Lolafilms	1,113,205	4,139,154
5	Butterfly's Tongue (La lengua de las mariposas)	Warner Sogefilms	918,569	3,678,048
6	Nobody Knows Anybody (Nadie conoce a nadie)	Warner Sogefilms	900,459	3,611,312
7	Between Your Legs (Entre las piernas)	Columbia TriStar	918,020	3,450,561
8	The Miracle of P. Tinto (El milagro de P. Tinto)	Warner Sogefilms	793,482	2,909,857
9	I Will Survive (Sobreviviré)	Aurum	675,250	2,607,496
10	Manolito Four Eyes (Manolito Gafotas)	Filmax	685,665	2,543,378

== See also ==
- 14th Goya Awards
