= Goya Award for Best Costume Design =

Annual award by the Spanish Film Academy

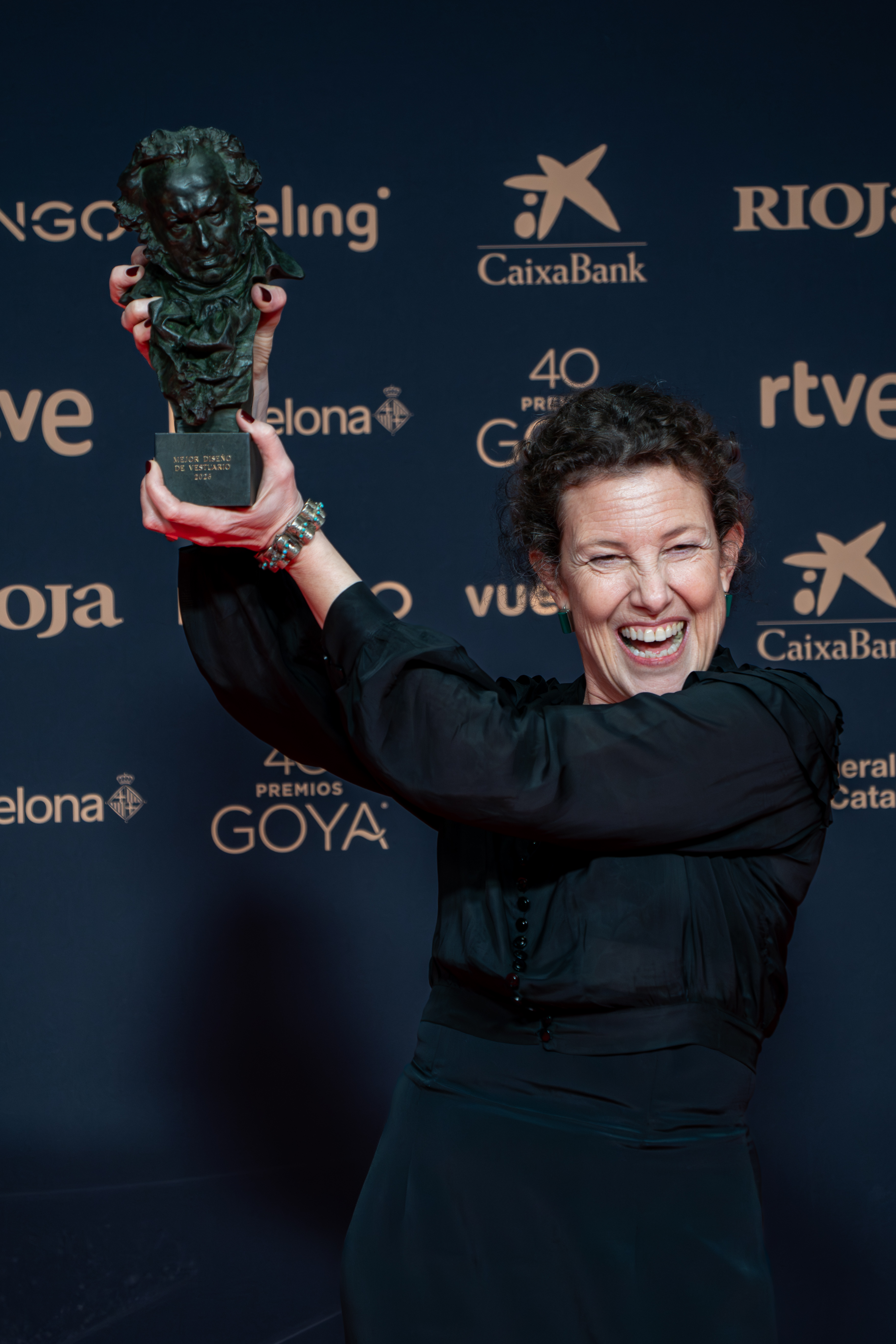
- The 2026 recipient: Helena Sanchis
- Native name: Premio Goya al mejor diseño de vestuario
- Awarded for: Best costume design in a Spanish film of the year
- Country: Spain
- Presented by: Academy of Cinematographic Arts and Sciences of Spain (AACCE)
- First award: 1st Goya Awards (1986)
- Most recent winner: Helena Sanchís; The Dinner (2025)
- Website: Official website

The Goya Award for Best Costume Design (Spanish: Premio Goya al mejor diseño de vestuario) is one of the Goya Awards presented annually by the Academy of Cinematographic Arts and Sciences of Spain (AACCE) since the awards debuted in 1986. Gerardo Vera was the first winner for his work in El amor brujo.

Javier Artiñano holds the record of most wins in this category with five followed by Yvonne Blake with four, Artiñano also is the most nominated for this award with eleven nominations.

== Winners and nominees ==
=== 1980s ===
Year	English title	Original title	Recipient(s)
1986 (1st)	El amor brujo		Gerardo Vera
1986 (1st)	Dragon Rapide		Javier Artiñano and Elisa Ruiz
1986 (1st)	Half of Heaven	La mitad del cielo	Gerardo Vera
1987 (2nd)	El bosque animado		Javier Artiñano
1987 (2nd)	The House of Bernarda Alba	La casa de Bernarda Alba	José Rubio
1987 (2nd)	A los cuatro vientos		Javier Artiñano
1988 (3rd)	Rowing with the Wind	Remando al viento	Yvonne Blake
1988 (3rd)	Berlín Blues		Gerardo Vera
1988 (3rd)	El Dorado		Maritsa González and Terry Pritchard
1988 (3rd)	Jarrapellejos		Javier Artiñano
1988 (3rd)	Women on the Verge of a Nervous Breakdown	Mujeres al borde de un ataque de nervios	José María Cossío
1989 (4th)	Moon Child	El niño de la luna	Montse Amenos and Isidro Prunes
1989 (4th)	The Dark Night	La noche oscura	Ana Alvargonzález
1989 (4th)	The Things of Love	Las cosas del querer	José María García Montes and María Luisa Zabala
1989 (4th)	Love, Hate and Death	Montoyas y Tarantos	Alfonso López Barajas
1989 (4th)	If They Tell You I Fell	Si te dicen que caí	Marcelo Grandes

=== 1990s ===
Year	English title	Original title	Recipient(s)
1990 (5th)	¡Ay Carmela!		Rafael Palmero and Mercedes Sánchez
1990 (5th)	Tie Me Up! Tie Me Down!	¡Átame!	José María Cossío
1990 (5th)	Yo no soy esa		José María García Montes, Lina Montero and María Luisa Zabala
1991 (6th)	The Dumbfounded King	El rey pasmado	Javier Artiñano
1991 (6th)	Don Juan in Hell	Don Juan en los infiernos	Yvonne Blake
1991 (6th)	High Heels	Tacones lejanos	José María Cossío
1992 (7th)	The Fencing Master	El maestro de esgrima	Javier Artiñano
1992 (7th)	Belle Époque		Lala Huete
1992 (7th)	The Anonymous Queen	La reina anónima	Yvonne Blake
1993 (8th)	Banderas, the Tyrant	Tirano Banderas	Andrea D'Odorico
1993 (8th)	Kika		José María Cossío
1993 (8th)	Madregilda		Gumersindo Andrés
1994 (9th)	Cradle Song	Canción de cuna	Yvonne Blake
1994 (9th)	Running Out of Time	Días contados	Helena Sanchís
1994 (9th)	The Turkish Passion	La pasión turca	Nereida Bonmatí
1995 (10th)	La leyenda de Balthasar el castrado		Pablo Gago Montilla
1995 (10th)	The Day of the Beast	El día de la bestia	Estíbaliz Markiegi
1995 (10th)	The Law of the Frontier	La ley de la frontera	María José Iglesias
1996 (11th)	The Dog in the Manger	El perro del hortelano	Pedro Moreno
1996 (11th)	La Celestina		Gerardo Vera and Sonia Grande
1996 (11th)	Libertarias		Javier Artiñano
1997 (12th)	The Chambermaid on the Titanic	La camarera del Titanic	Franca Squarciapino
1997 (12th)	The Disappearance of Garcia Lorca	Muerte en Granada	León Revuelta
1997 (12th)	Perdita Durango		María Estela Fernández and Glenn Ralston
1998 (13th)	The Girl of Your Dreams	La niña de tus ojos	Lala Huete and Sonia Grande
1998 (13th)	A los que aman		Marcé Paloma
1998 (13th)	The Grandfather	El abuelo	Gumersindo Andrés
1998 (13th)	A Time for Defiance	La hora de los valientes	Javier Artiñano
1999 (14th)	Goya in Bordeaux	Goya en Burdeos	Pedro Moreno
1999 (14th)	Butterfly's Tongue	La lengua de las mariposas	Sonia Grande
1999 (14th)	All About My Mother	Todo sobre mi madre	José María Cosío and Sabine Daigeler
1999 (14th)	Volavérunt		Franca Squarciapino

=== 2000s ===
Year	English title	Original title	Recipient(s)
2000 (15th)	Lázaro de Tormes		Javier Artiñano
2000 (15th)	Kisses for Everyone	Besos para todos	Pedro Moreno
2000 (15th)	Common Wealth	La comunidad	Paco Delgado
2000 (15th)	You're the One	You're the One (una historia de entonces)	Gumersindo Andrés
2001 (16th)	Mad Love	Juana la Loca	Javier Artiñano
2001 (16th)	Off Key	Desafinado	Alberto Luna
2001 (16th)	The Devil's Backbone	El espinazo del diablo	José Vico
2001 (16th)	The Others	Los otros	Sonia Grande
2002 (17th)	The Shanghai Spell	El embrujo de Shanghai	Lala Huete
2002 (17th)	Callas Forever		Anna Anni, Alberto Spiazzi and Alessandro Lai
2002 (17th)	Carol's Journey	El viaje de Carol	Lena Mossum
2002 (17th)	Story of a Kiss	Historia de un beso	Gumersindo Andrés
2003 (18th)	Carmen		Yvonne Blake
2003 (18th)	Danube Hotel	Hotel Danubio	Montse Sancho and Lourdes de Orduña
2003 (18th)	Mortadelo & Filemon: The Big Adventure	La gran aventura de Mortadelo y Filemón	Tatiana Hernández
2003 (18th)	November	Noviembre	Nereida Bonmatí
2004 (19th)	The Bridge of San Luis Rey	El puente de San Luis Rey	Yvonne Blake
2004 (19th)	Inconscientes		Sabine Daigeler
2004 (19th)	The Whore and the Whale	La puta y la ballena	Sonia Grande
2004 (19th)	Tiovivo c. 1950		Lourdes de Orduña
2005 (20th)	Camarón: When Flamenco Became Legend	Camarón	María José Iglesias
2005 (20th)	Kingdom of Heaven		Janty Yates
2005 (20th)	Ants in the Mouth	Hormigas en la boca	Sonia Grande
2005 (20th)	Princesas		Sabine Daigeler
2006 (21st)	Alatriste		Francesca Sartori
2006 (21st)	The Borgia	Los Borgia	Luciano Capozzi
2006 (21st)	Goya's Ghosts	Los fantasmas de Goya	Yvonne Blake
2006 (21st)	Volver		Bina Daigeler
2007 (22nd)	13 Roses	Las 13 rosas	Lena Mossum
2007 (22nd)	The Orphanage	El orfanato	María Reyes
2007 (22nd)	Lola, the Movie	Lola, la película	Sonia Grande
2007 (22nd)	Sunday Light	Luz de domingo	Lourdes de Orduña
2008 (23rd)	El Grego		Lala Huete
2008 (23rd)	La Conjura de El Escorial		Javier Artiñano
2008 (23rd)	The Blind Sunflowers	Los girasoles ciegos	Sonia Grande
2008 (23rd)	Sangre de Mayo		Lourdes de Orduña
2009 (24th)	Agora	Ágora	Gabriella Pescucci
2009 (24th)	The Dancer and the Thief	El baile de la Victoria	Lala Huete
2009 (24th)	El cónsul de Sodoma		Cristina Rodríguez
2009 (24th)	Broken Embraces	Los abrazos rotos	Sonia Grande

=== 2010s ===
Year	English title	Original title	Recipient(s)
2010 (25th)	Lope		Tatiana Hernández
2010 (25th)	The Last Circus	Balada triste de trompeta	Paco Delgado
2010 (25th)	Black Bread	Pa negre (Pan negro)	Mercè Paloma
2010 (25th)	Even the Rain	También la lluvia	Sonia Grande
2011 (26th)	Blackthorn		Clara Bilbao
2011 (26th)	The Skin I Live In	La piel que habito	Paco Delgado
2011 (26th)	The Sleeping Voice	La voz dormida	María José Iglesias
2011 (26th)	No Rest for the Wicked	No habrá paz para los malvados	Patricia Monné
2012 (27th)	Blancanieves		Paco Delgado
2012 (27th)	The Artist and the Model	El artista y la modelo	Lala Huete
2012 (27th)	Unit 7	Grupo 7	Fernando García
2012 (27th)	Picasso's Gang	La banda Picasso	Vicente Ruiz
2013 (28th)	Witching & Bitching	Las brujas de Zugarramurdi	Paco Delgado
2013 (28th)	Three Many Weddings	3 bodas de más	Cristina Rodríguez
2013 (28th)	I'm So Excited!	Los amantes pasajeros	Tatiana Hernández
2013 (28th)	Living Is Easy with Eyes Closed	Vivir es fácil con los ojos cerrados	Lala Huete
2014 (29th)	Marshland	La isla mínima	Fernando García
2014 (29th)	El Niño		Tatiana Hernández
2014 (29th)	Autómata		Armaveni Stoyanova
2014 (29th)	Por un puñado de besos		Cristina Rodríguez
2015 (30th)	Nobody Wants the Night	Nadie quiere la noche	Clara Bilbao
2015 (30th)	My Big Night	Mi gran noche	Paola Torres
2015 (30th)	Palm Trees in the Snow	Palmeras en la nieve	Loles García Galeán
2015 (30th)	A Perfect Day	Un día perfecto	Fernando García
2016 (31st)	1898, Our Last Men in the Philippines	1898, Los últimos de Filipinas	Paola Torres
2016 (31st)	Don't Blame the Karma for Being an Idiot	No culpes al karma de lo que te pasa por gilipollas	Cristina Rodríguez
2016 (31st)	The Queen of Spain	La reina de España	Lala Huete
2016 (31st)	The Fury of a Patient Man	Tarde para la ira	Alberto Valcárcel and Cristina Rodríguez
2017 (32nd)	Giant	Handia	Saioa Lara
2017 (32nd)	Abracadabra		Paco Delgado
2017 (32nd)	The Bookshop	La librería	Mercè Paloma
2017 (32nd)	Gold	Oro	Tatiana Hernández
2018 (33rd)	Gun City	La sombra de la ley	Clara Bilbao
2018 (33rd)	The Photographer of Mauthausen	El fotógrafo de Mauthausen	Mercè Paloma
2018 (33rd)	The Man Who Killed Don Quixote	El hombre que mató a Don Quixote	Lena Mossum
2018 (33rd)	Quién te cantará	Quién te cantará	Ana López Cobos
2019 (34th)	While at War	Mientras dure la guerra	Sonia Grande
2019 (34th)	Pain and Glory	Dolor y gloria	Paola Torres
2019 (34th)	The Endless Trench	La trinchera infinita	Lourdes Fuentes and Saiola Lara
2019 (34th)	Paradise Hills		Alberto Valcárcel

=== 2020s ===
Year	English title	Original title	Recipient(s)
2020 (35th)	Coven	Akelarre	Nerea Torrijos
2020 (35th)	My Heart Goes Boom!	Explota Explota	Cristina Rodríguez
2020 (35th)	Schoolgirls	Las niñas	Arantxa Ezquerro
2020 (35th)	The Europeans	Los europeos	Lena Mossum
2021 (36th)	Outlaws	Las leyes de la frontera	Vinyet Escobar
2021 (36th)	Love Gets a Room	El amor en su lugar	Alberto Valcárcel
2021 (36th)	The Good Boss	El buen patrón	Fernando García
2021 (36th)	Maixabel		Clara Bilbao
2022 (37th)	Prison 77	Modelo 77	Fernando García
2022 (37th)	The Beasts	As bestas	Paola Torres
2022 (37th)	Irati		Nerea Torrijos
2022 (37th)	Piety	La piedad	Suevia Sampelayo
2022 (37th)	God's Crooked Lines	Los renglones torcidos de Dios	Alberto Valcárcel
2022 (37th)	Valley of the Dead	Malnazidos	Cristina Rodríguez
2023 (38th)	Society of the Snow	La sociedad de la nieve	Julio Suárez
2023 (38th)	20,000 Species of Bees	20.000 especies de abejas	Nerea Torrijos
2023 (38th)	The Teacher Who Promised the Sea	El maestro que prometió el mar	Maria Armengol
2023 (38th)	The Movie Teller	La contadora de películas	Mercè Paloma
2023 (38th)	Jokes & Cigarettes	Saben aquell	Lala Huete
2024 (39th)	The Red Virgin	La virgen roja	Arantxa Ezquerro
2024 (39th)	Disco, Ibiza, Locomía		Ester Palaudàries, Vinyet Escobar
2024 (39th)	The 47	El 47	Irantzu Ortiz, Olga Rodal
2024 (39th)	The Room Next Door	La habitación de al lado	Bina Daigeler
2024 (39th)	Saturn Return	Segundo premio	Lourdes Fuentes
2025 (40th)	The Dinner	La cena	Helena Sanchis
2025 (40th)	The Captive	El cautivo	Nicoletta Taranta
2025 (40th)	Gaua		Nerea Torrijos
2025 (40th)	Sundays	Los domingos	Ana Martínez Fesser
2025 (40th)	Romería		Anna Aguilà
