= 14th Goya Awards =

- Date: 29 January 2000
- Site: L'Auditori, Barcelona
- Hosted by: Antonia San Juan
- Directed by: Rosa Vergés
- Organized by: Academy of Cinematographic Arts and Sciences of Spain

Highlights
- Best Film: All About My Mother
- Best Actor: Francisco Rabal; Goya in Bordeaux
- Best Actress: Cecilia Roth; All About My Mother
- Most awards: All About My Mother (7)
- Most nominations: All About My Mother (14)

Television coverage
- Network: TVE
- Viewership: 2.82 million (30.0%)

The 14th Goya Awards ceremony, presented by the Academy of Cinematographic Arts and Sciences of Spain, took place at L'Auditori in Barcelona on 29 January 2000. It was written by Jaume Figueras and Rosa Vergés, directed by Vergés and hosted by Antonia San Juan. It was the first Goya awards ceremony held outside of Madrid.

All About My Mother won the award for Best Film. The television broadcast on La 1 drew 2,816,000 viewers (30.0% audience share).

== Winners and nominees ==
The winners and nominees are listed as follows:

Best Film: All About My Mother; Alone; Butterfly's Tongue; By My Side Again	Best Director: Pedro Almodóvar – All About My Mother; José Luis Cuerda – Butterfly's Tongue; Gracia Querejeta – By My Side Again; Benito Zambrano – Alone
Best Actor: Francisco Rabal – Goya in Bordeaux; Fernando Fernán Gómez – Butterfly's Tongue; Jordi Mollà – Second Skin; Josep Maria Pou – Beloved/Friend	Best Actress: Cecilia Roth – All About My Mother; Ariadna Gil – Black Tears; Carmen Maura – Lisbon; Mercedes Sampietro – By My Side Again
Best Supporting Actor: Juan Diego – Paris-Timbuktu; Álex Angulo – Dying of Laughter; José Coronado – Goya in Bordeaux; Mario Gas – Beloved/Friend	Best Supporting Actress: María Galiana – Alone; Candela Peña – All About My Mother; Adriana Ozores – By My Side Again; Julieta Serrano – By My Side Again
Best Original Screenplay: Benito Zambrano – Alone; Pedro Almodóvar – All About My Mother; Manuel Gutiérrez Aragón, Elías Querejeta, Gracia Querejeta – By My Side Again; Icíar Bollaín, Julio Llamazares – Flowers from Another World	Best Adapted Screenplay: Rafael Azcona – Butterfly's Tongue; Josep Maria Benet i Jornet – Beloved/Friend; Miguel Albaladejo, Elvira Lindo – Manolito Four Eyes; Paz Alicia Garciadiego – No One Writes to the Colonel
Best New Actor: Carlos Álvarez-Nóvoa – Alone; Eduard Fernández – Washington Wolves; Manuel Lozano – Butterfly's Tongue; Luis Tosar – Flowers from Another World	Best New Actress: Ana Fernández – Alone; Silvia Abascal – The Yellow Fountain; María Botto – Jealousy; Antonia San Juan – All About My Mother
Best New Director: Benito Zambrano – Alone; María Ripoll – The Man with Rain in His Shoes; Mateo Gil – Nobody Knows Anybody; Miguel Bardem – The Ugliest Woman in the World	Best Original Score: Alberto Iglesias – All About My Mother; Ángel Illarramendi – By My Side Again; Alejandro Amenábar – Butterfly's Tongue; Antonio Meliveo – Alone
Best Cinematography: Vittorio Storaro – Goya in Bordeaux; Affonso Beato – All About My Mother; Javier Salmones – Butterfly's Tongue; Paco Femenía – Volavérunt	Best Editing: José Salcedo – All About My Mother; Fernando Pardo – Alone; Nacho Ruiz Capillas – Butterfly's Tongue; Julia Juániz – Goya in Bordeaux
Best Art Direction: Pierre-Louis Thévenet – Goya in Bordeaux; Josep Rosell – Butterfly's Tongue; Antxón Gómez – All About My Mother; Luis "Koldo" Vallés – Volavérunt	Best Production Supervision: Esther García – All About My Mother; Carmen Martínez – Goya in Bordeaux; Emiliano Otegui – Butterfly's Tongue; Eduardo Santana – Alone
Best Sound: José Antonio Bermúdez, Diego Garrido, Miguel Rejas – All About My Mother; Carlos Faruolo, Patrick Ghislain, Jorge Marín – Alone; Patrick Ghislain, Daniel Goldstein, Ricardo Steinberg – Butterfly's Tongue; Carlos Faruolo, Jaime Fernández, Alfonso Pino, Alfonso Raposo – Goya in Bordeaux	Best Special Effects: Raúl Romanillos, Manuel Horrillo, José Núñez, Emilio Ruiz del Río – Nobody Knows Anybody; Reyes Abades, Hipólito Cantero, José María Aragonés – The City of Marvels; Reyes Abades, Fabrizio Storaro – Goya in Bordeaux; Alejandro Álvarez, José Álvarez, David Martí, Reyes Abades – The Ugliest Woman in the World
Best Costume Design: Pedro Moreno – Goya in Bordeaux; Sabine Daigeler, José María de Cossío – All About My Mother; Sonia Grande – Butterfly's Tongue; Franca Squarciapino – Volavérunt	Best Makeup and Hairstyles: José Quetglás, Susana Sánchez, Blanca Sánchez – Goya in Bordeaux; Ana López-Puigcerver, Teresa Rabal – Butterfly's Tongue; Juan Pedro Hernández, Jean-Jacques Puchu – All About My Mother; Lourdes Briones, Paillette, Manolo Carretero, Annie Marandin – Volavérunt
Best Fictional Short Film: Siete cafés por semana; Back Room; El paraíso perdido; Lencería de ocasión; Obsesión	Best Documentary Short Film: Lalia; El olvido de la memoria; Positivo
Best Animated Short Film: Los girasoles; Animal; Podría ser peor; Smoke City; William Wilson	Best Animated Film: Goomer
Best Spanish Language Foreign Film: Life Is to Whistle • Cuba; Crane World • Argentina; Juan, I Forgot I Don't Remember • Mexico; Time Out • Colombia	Best European Film: Life Is Beautiful • Italy; Black Cat, White Cat • France; The Dinner Game • France; It All Starts Today • France

=== Films with multiple nominations and awards ===
Films with multiple nominations
Nominations	Film
14	All About My Mother
13	Butterfly's Tongue
11	Alone
10	Goya in Bordeaux
7	By My Side Again
4	Volavérunt
3	Beloved/Friend
2	Flowers from Another World
2	Nobody Knows Anybody
2	The Ugliest Woman in the World

Films with multiple awards
Awards	Film
7	All About My Mother
5	Alone
5	Goya in Bordeaux

== Honorary Goya ==
Antonio Isasi-Isasmendi was the recipient of the Honorary Goya Award.
