= Clara Bilbao =

Spanish costume designer and film director (born 1971)

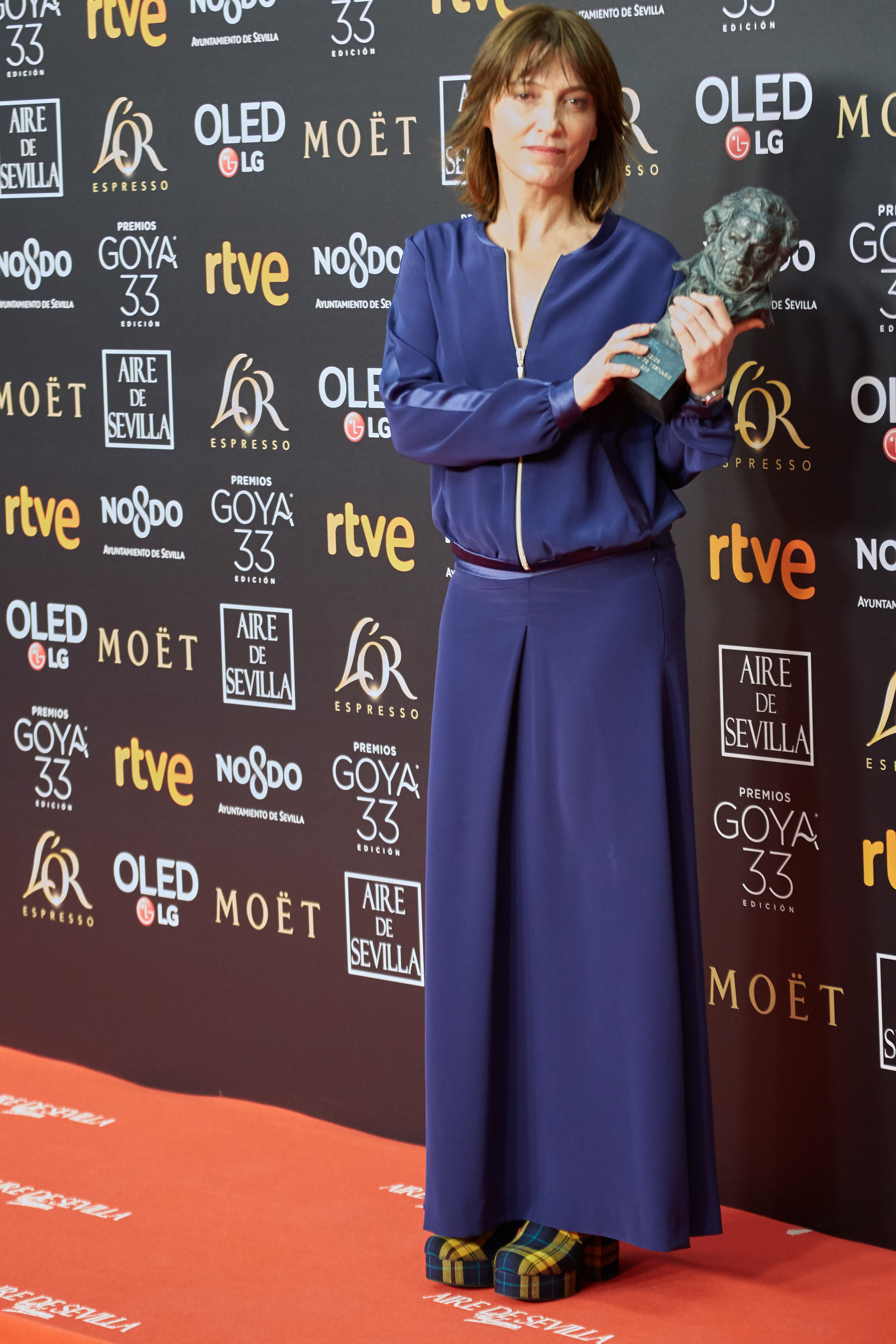
- Clara Bilbao at the 2019 Goya Awards
- Born: February 23, 1971 (age 55); Bilbao, Basque Country, Spain
- Occupations: Costume designer; film director
- Years active: 1994–present
- Known for: Three Goya Awards for Best Costume Design

Clara Bilbao (born 23 February 1971, in Bilbao) is a Spanish costume designer and film director who has won the Goya Award for Best Costume Design three times: for Blackthorn (2012), Nadie quiere la noche (2016), and La sombra de la ley (2019), making her one of the most decorated costume designers in the history of the Spanish film industry, with a career encompassing over fifty productions in cinema and television across three decades.

== Early life and education ==
Clara Bilbao was born on 23 February 1971 in Bilbao. The daughter of a seamstress, she developed an early interest in garment making. She studied at the Centro Superior de Diseño de Moda de Madrid (CSDMM), part of the Universidad Politécnica de Madrid (UPM), where she specialised in Scenic Costume Design.

== Career ==
=== Costume design ===
Bilbao entered the audiovisual industry in 1994, making her debut as a costume designer on the short film El tren de las ocho in 1996. Her first feature film credit was Quince (1998), directed by Francisco Rodríguez Fernández.

Her most celebrated work as a costume designer includes Blackthorn (2011), a western directed by Mateo Gil starring Sam Shepard and Stephen Rea, which imagines Butch Cassidy surviving into old age in Bolivia; Nadie quiere la noche (2015), directed by Isabel Coixet and set in the Arctic, starring Juliette Binoche and Gabriel Byrne; and La sombra de la ley (2018), a period thriller set in 1920s Barcelona directed by Dani de la Torre. All three productions earned her the Goya Award for Best Costume Design. La sombra de la ley also earned her the Premio Mestre Mateo for costume design from the Academia Galega do Audiovisual.

Bilbao received a fourth Goya nomination for Maixabel (2021), directed by Icíar Bollaín, a film that received fourteen Goya nominations overall. She also designed costumes for Soy Nevenka (2024), a Movistar+ miniseries directed by Bollaín.

In 2024, the Festival Internacional de Cine de Alicante awarded Bilbao the Fashion Cinema Award in recognition of her three-decade career, and the Ourense Film Festival (OUFF) presented her with its Premio Especial OUFF 2024 for the totality of her professional work.

=== Television ===
Bilbao has been a costume designer for high-profile Spanish television productions. Her television credits include La zona (Movistar+, 2017), the HBO adaptation of Fernando Aramburu's novel Patria (2020), Los favoritos de Midas (Netflix, 2020), La Fortuna (Movistar+, 2021–2022, directed by Alejandro Amenábar), and El zorro (Amazon Prime Video, 2024). Her work on Patria required reconstructing the fashion of several decades of Basque Country life, a challenge she described as building a visual archive of an era all Spaniards remembered.

=== Directing career ===
Bilbao made her directorial debut with the short film Prohibido arrojar cadáveres a la basura (2014), a dystopian science-fiction piece starring María Botto, set in a near-future Spain in which citizens can no longer afford funerals. The film won the Jury Prize for Best Direction at the 2015 Festival de Cine de Terror y Fantástico de Peligros in Granada. Actor Antonio de la Torre, upon seeing the film at a festival, contacted Bilbao to express his interest in collaborating if she ever made a feature. Her second short, Brexit (2018), is a comedy about Spaniards living in London during the Brexit process.

Her debut feature film, Tratamos demasiado bien a las mujeres (2024), is based on the 1947 novel by Raymond Queneau, with a screenplay by Miguel Barros. It stars Carmen Machi and Antonio de la Torre, alongside Luis Tosar, Julián Villagrán, Isak Férriz, and Óscar Ladoire. Filming began in late March 2023 in Galicia. The film had its world premiere at the 27th Málaga Film Festival on 3 March 2024, where it won the Premio ASECAN for Best First Film. Prior to its general release, the film held a pre-screening at the Academia de las Artes y las Ciencias Cinematográficas de España in Madrid. It was released in Spanish cinemas on 15 March 2024, distributed by Filmax, and was featured in Vogue España as one of the notable openings of the season. The film received a positive critical reception, with Fotogramas praising Carmen Machi's performance as formidable and dangerous.

In interviews, Bilbao stated she had no intention of being dogmatic in the film's approach to its themes, describing it as an irreverent take on the Spanish Civil War era that prioritised character and dark humour over ideology. Bilbao also reflected on the broader challenges facing film directors today, noting that the complexity of the role had grown considerably in the contemporary industry. Bilbao was subsequently named the honorary godmother (madrina) of the RTVE cinema programme Días de Cine in recognition of her debut.

== Filmography ==
=== As costume designer (selected) ===
Year	Title	Director	Medium
1998	Quince	Francisco Rodríguez Fernández	Film
2006	La distancia	Iñaki Dorronsoro	Film
2010	Planes para mañana	Juana Macías	Film
2011	Blackthorn	Mateo Gil	Film
2015	Nadie quiere la noche	Isabel Coixet	Film
2016	Cuerpo de élite	Joaquín Mazón	Film
2016	Proyecto Lázaro	Mateo Gil	Film
2017	La zona	Jorge Dorado	Television
2018	La sombra de la ley	Dani de la Torre	Film
2018	La enfermedad del domingo	Ramón Salazar	Film
2020	Patria	Félix Viscarret	Television
2020	Los favoritos de Midas	Mateo Gil	Television
2021	Maixabel	Icíar Bollaín	Film
2022	La Fortuna	Alejandro Amenábar	Television
2023	Que nadie duerma	Antonio Mercero Jr.	Film
2024	Soy Nevenka	Icíar Bollaín	Television
2024	El zorro	Various	Television

=== As director ===
Year	Title	Medium
2014	Prohibido arrojar cadáveres a la basura	Short film
2018	Brexit	Short film
2024	Tratamos demasiado bien a las mujeres	Feature film

== Awards and nominations ==
Year	Award	Category	Film	Result	Ref
2012	Goya Award for Best Costume Design	Best Costume Design	Blackthorn	Won	
2016	Goya Award for Best Costume Design	Best Costume Design	Nadie quiere la noche	Won	
2019	Goya Award for Best Costume Design	Best Costume Design	La sombra de la ley	Won	
2019	Premio Mestre Mateo	Best Costume Design	La sombra de la ley	Won	
2022	Goya Award for Best Costume Design	Best Costume Design	Maixabel	Nominated	
2024	Premio ASECAN	Best First Film (as director)	Tratamos demasiado bien a las mujeres	Won	
2024	Fashion Cinema Award (Festival de Alicante)	Career honour	—	Won	
2024	Premio Especial OUFF	Career honour	—	Won	
