= The Tip of the Iceberg =

- Theatrical release poster
- Spanish: La punta del iceberg
- Directed by: David Cánovas
- Written by: David Cánovas; José Amaro Carrillo; Alberto García Martín
- Produced by: Gerardo Herrero
- Starring: Maribel Verdú; Carmelo Gómez; Bárbara Goenaga; Fernando Cayo; Álex García; Ginés García Millán
- Cinematography: Juan Carlos Gómez
- Music by: Antonio Hernández
- Production companies: Tornasol Films; Mistery Producciones A.I.E.; Hernández y Fernández PP.CC; Perenquen Films AIE
- Distributed by: Syldavia Cinema
- Release dates: 23 April 2016 (FMCE); 29 April 2016 (Spain)
- Running time: 93 minutes
- Country: Spain
- Language: Spanish

The Tip of the Iceberg (Spanish: La punta del iceberg) is a 2016 Spanish thriller film directed by David Cánovas which stars Maribel Verdú, Carmelo Gómez, Bárbara Goenaga, Fernando Cayo, Álex García and Ginés García Millán. It is an adaptation of the stage play of the same name by Antonio Tabares.

== Plot ==
In the wake of the suicide of three individuals employed by a multinational tech company, a company executive is tasked with elaborating an internal report on the incident. What she finds out vis-à-vis the working environment is disturbing.

== Cast ==
- Maribel Verdú as Sofía Cuevas
- Carmelo Gómez as Alejandro García
- Bárbara Goenaga as Gabriela Benassar.
- Fernando Cayo as Carlos Fresno
- Álex García as Jaime Salas
- Ginés García Millán
- Jesús Castejón as Carmelo Luis

== Production ==
The Tip of the Iceberg is David Cánovas' debut film. Based on the stage play of the same name by Eduardo Tabares, the film was written by David Cánovas alongside José Amaro Carrillo and Alberto García Martín. Gerardo Herrero is credited as producer. It was produced by Tornasol Films, Mistery Producciones A.I.E., Hernández y Fernández Producciones Cinematográficas and Perenquen Films AIE, with the participation of TVE, the support from ICAA and funding from ICO.

== Release ==
The film was presented at the Málaga Film Festival (FMCE) on 23 April 2016. Distributed by Syldavia Cinema, the film was theatrically released in Spain on 29 April 2016.

== See also ==
- List of Spanish films of 2016
