= Etxepare Basque Institute =

The Etxepare Basque Institute is a public agency created by the Basque Government. The institute is named after Bernat Etxepare, author of Linguae Vasconum Primitiae (1545), the first book to be published in the Basque language, or Euskara. The phrase that defines the Institute can be found in that first book: "Heuscara/Ialgi hadi mundura" (Euskara, go out into the world).

The aim is to promote the Basque language, culture and creative talent internationally, and to build lasting relationships with other countries and cultures in these areas. To this end, the Etxepare Basque Institute supports quality artistic activities and cultural mobility of artists and industry professionals, as well as teaching Euskara and Basque culture. It also encourages collaboration with international stakeholders in both the cultural and academic fields, working closely with the official Basque delegations abroad.

The Etxepare Basque Institute opened its doors on 29 October 2010 at its Prim Street office in Donostia-San Sebastián. In September 2015, the Institute moved to its permanent location in the Tabakalera building in Donostia.

Irene Larraza is the institute's Director (following Aizpea Goenaga and Miren Arzalluz); Garbiñe Iztueta is Head of Promotion and Dissemination of the Basque Language, and Imanol Otaegi is Head of Promotion and Dissemination of Basque Culture. Etxepare is supported by the Basque Government Department of Education, Linguistic Policy and Culture. The Etxepare Basque Institute was created in 2007 by Law 3/2007, of April 20, that regulates the creation of the Etxepare Basque Institute.

== Objectives ==
The purpose of the Etxepare Basque Institute is to disseminate the most significant manifestations of Basque culture. Its primary objectives are:

- To encourage and promote international recognition of the Basque language.
- To promote the teaching, learning and use of Euskara throughout the world.
- To support research on Basque culture, especially at universities and high-level research centres.
- To inspire curiosity about Basque culture.
- To raise the international profile of cultural projects created in the Basque Country: encourage efforts and actions that benefit dissemination, with emphasis on promoting and ensuring an outlet for cultural undertakings created in Euskara.
- Collaborate with Basque creative talent, stakeholders and producers: offer new opportunities based on needs, open access to international cultural organizations and promoters; the authors are the resource, the institute is the bridge.

== Dissemination of euskara ==
In its work to disseminate the Basque language, the Etxepare Basque Institute creates points of contact with other languages and communities and implements learning and research programmes at the international level. Projects in this area include Basque language and culture readership programmes at universities around the world, grants for students enrolled in these courses, Basque studies chairs and teacher training courses, among others. Etxepare has 36 readerships in different countries, plus nine university chairs:

- Bernardo Atxaga Chair: City University of New York
- Jon Bilbao Chair: University of Nevada Reno
- Manuel de Irujo Chair: University of Liverpool
- Koldo Mitxelena Chair: University of Chicago
- Eduardo Chillida Chair: Frankfurt Goethe Universität
- Jean Haritschelhar Chair: Université Bordeaux Montaigne
- Eloise Garmendia Bieter Chair: Boise State University
- William A. Douglass Chair: University of Massachusetts Amherst
- Amale Artetxe Chair: CONICET

The institute also participates in high-profile international language forums and other language-related events to raise awareness among public institutions and people from other countries of the Basque language and its current status.

Supporting translation is one of the institute's main lines of work. Every year Etxepare provides grants for translators of Basque literature into foreign languages and manages the Etxepare-LABORAL Kutxa Translation Prize for the year's best translation.

The institute also publishes some booklets on Basque literature and culture in three languages in both paper format and online.

== Dissemination of Basque Culture ==
At the Etxepare Basque Institute, the artists themselves play the leading role. The institute is a mediator designed to show the world the creative work being done in the Basque Country, bringing together distinct voices for a sole purpose. To achieve this objective, Etxepare cultivates close relationships with Basque artists and the Basque cultural industry to promote their work in the most appropriate way and build bridges when necessary.

The Institute attends some of the world's most important fairs devoted to education, books, film, theatre and dance, among others, in keeping with its goal to raise the profile of Basque productions and creative endeavours. It sets up meetings, promotes relations between different stakeholders and organizes activities aimed at drawing attention to our culture.

One of the institute's main focuses is collaborating with other stakeholders. The Etxepare Basque Institute continually signs agreements with private organizations and public agencies to develop specific programmes and activities. It undertakes productions and co-productions featured in high-profile cultural venues in different countries, joining forces with local agents. Likewise, the Institute collaborates in various festivals which dedicate a space to Basque culture. One example is the 'Basque Window', a glimpse into Basque cinema, which has been created for certain festivals in the Americas and Europe; another is having Euskadi (the Basque Country) as featured country at music and theatre festivals.

Moreover, the Institute manages grants to promote international exposure to the Basque language and culture. Awarded in the areas of music, performing arts, audiovisuals, literature and visual arts, the grants are aimed at facilitating the participation of Basque artists in professional fairs, as well as encouraging literary translation and covering travel costs.

In its commitment to reciprocity and exchange, the Etxepare Basque Institute's activities are not geared toward publicising Basque culture. However, the Institute assumes its responsibility as a two-way cultural exchange, fostering relationships with other cultures. Along the same lines, it has joined forces with other stakeholders to create residency programmes to allow Basque artists to gain experience and international exposure.
