= Marbella (TV series) =

2024 Spanish crime thriller series

- Created by: Alberto Marini; Dani de la Torre
- Written by: Alberto Marini; Dani de la Torre
- Story by: Nacho Carretero; Arturo Lezcano
- Directed by: Dani de la Torre; Oskar Santos
- Starring: Hugo Silva; Ana Isabelle; Khadil El Paisano; Aurora Moroni; Daniele Fileti; Manuela Calle; Natalia de Molina
- Music by: Manuel Riveiro
- Country of origin: Spain
- Original language: Spanish
- No. of seasons: 2
- No. of episodes: 12

Production
- Executive producers: Fran Araújo; Ignacio Corrales; Pepe Ripoll; Dani de la Torre; Alberto Marini; Arturo Lezcano; Nacho Carretero
- Cinematography: Josu Inchaustegui; Ibon Antuñano Totorika
- Production company: Buendía Estudios

Original release
- Release: 2 May 2024 – 2 February 2026

Marbella is a Spanish crime thriller television series created by Alberto Marini and Dani de la Torre. Its cast features Hugo Silva and (in the second season) Natalia de Molina.

== Plot ==
Set in Marbella, the plot follows the meddlings of amoral lawyer César Beltrán as he seeks to draw the interest of new face Yassim, a gangster belonging to the Dutch mafia. In the second series, the ruthless anti-narcotics prosecutor Carmen Leal seeks to jail César.

== Cast ==
- Hugo Silva as César Beltrán
- Ana Isabelle as Katy
- Khadil El Paisano as Yassim
- Aurora Moroni as Anne
- Daniele Fileti as Claudio
- Manuela Calle as Alexandra
- Elvira Mínguez as Marta
- Fernando Cayo as Esteban Setién

Introduced in season 2

- Natalia de Molina as Carmen Leal

== Production ==
Developed by Alberto Marini, the story drew from the journalistic research of Arturo Lezcano and Nacho Carretero. The series was produced by Buendía Estudios. Shooting locations included Marbella, Cádiz, and Gran Canaria. In June 2024, it was reported that the series had been renewed for a second season, to be produced by Buendía Estudios too.

== Release ==
The series debuted on Movistar Plus+ on 2 May 2024. The full 6-episode second season, released under the subtitle Expediente judicial, premiered on 22 January 2026.

== Reception ==
Andrés Salas of Cinemanía assessed that the series "provides a very accurate picture of what organised crime is like in the south of our country [Spain]".

== See also ==
- 2024 in Spanish television
