= Shacky Carmine =

- Theatrical release poster
- Directed by: Chema de la Peña
- Screenplay by: Chema de la Peña; Óscar de Julián
- Produced by: Beatriz de la Gándara
- Starring: Fernando Cayo; Andrés Gertrúdix; Rebeca Jiménez; Pau Cólera; Manolo Caro
- Cinematography: David Omedes
- Edited by: Antonio Lara
- Production company: Fernando Colomo PC
- Distributed by: Aurum Films
- Release date: 10 September 1999
- Country: Spain
- Language: Spanish

Shacky Carmine is a 1999 Spanish musical melodrama film directed by Chema de la Peña. It stars Fernando Cayo, Andrés Gertrúdix, Rebeca Jiménez, Pau Cólera, and Manolo Caro.

== Plot ==
The plot follows the rise of a rock band from Salamanca formed by Apolo, Zalo, Rodol, Malú which is managed by Kiko as they move to Madrid.

== Cast ==
- Fernando Cayo as Apolo
- Pau Cólera as Zalo
- Rebeca Jiménez as Malú
- Andrés Gertrúdix as Rodol
- Nathalie Seseña as Jana
- Manolo Caro as Kiko
- Patxi Freytez as P.K.
- Mapi Galán as Toni Mad
- Josele Román as Tini
- Alicia Álvarez as Neska
- Kiko Veneno as comisario Veneno
- Antonio Vega as Willy
- Carmen Machi as periodista Telek

== Production ==
The film is a Fernando Colomo PC production and it had the backing from Vía Digital. Bunbury, Undershakers, Lliso and Carlos Jean composed songs for the film while the soundtrack also featured themes by Dover, Undrop, Hank, 7Notas 7Colores, Super Skunk, Narco, Klub, and Ari.

== Release ==
Distributed by Aurum, Shacky Carmine was released theatrically in Spain on 10 September 1999. The film also screened at the 1999 Toulouse Spanish Film Festival (Cinespaña).

== Reception ==
Jonathan Holland of Variety welcomed the film as "a hip, well-played take on the rags-to-almost-riches rise of a Spanish rock group".

== See also ==
- List of Spanish films of 1999
