= Under Her Control =

2022 Spanish film directed by Fran Torres

- Film poster
- Spanish: La jefa
- Directed by: Fran Torres
- Screenplay by: Laura Sarmiento
- Starring: Aitana Sánchez-Gijón; Cumelén Sanz; Alex Pastrana; Vanessa Rasero; Pedro Casablanc
- Production companies: Feelgood Media; Francisco Torres Quincoces; Hugo-Daniel Boyero Garmendia; Penúltima Toma AIE; Teoponte PC; Audiovisuales del Monte
- Distributed by: Filmax
- Release date: 29 April 2022
- Running time: 100 minutes (Netflix); 99 minutes
- Country: Spain
- Language: Spanish
- Box office: $56,829

Under Her Control (Spanish: La jefa, lit. 'The Boss') is a 2022 Spanish drama film directed by Fran Torres in his feature length debut, starring Aitana Sánchez-Gijón and Cumelén Sanz.

== Plot ==
Sofia, along with her boyfriend Nacho, is an Argentinian immigrant living in Madrid, Spain. Nacho wants to start a family, but Sofia is reluctant to do so, even going so far as to conceal her pregnancy from him. She considers having an abortion, but her priest dissuades and guilts her out of it. After landing an internship with the fashion designer she idolizes, Beatriz, she quickly becomes a favourite of the boss, but breaks down in front of her and reveals her pregnancy.

Beatriz, being a middle-aged woman who could never bear a child, offers Sofia a deal; a massive payout in exchange for giving her child up to Beatriz illegally. It would require her to live with Beatriz in a secluded country estate, so that no one would see Sofia pregnant. Sofia accepts and convinces a dejected Nacho to travel to visit family in Argentina in the meantime. Beatriz brings in Cristina, her private doctor, as well as her lawyer Julio, to ensure that Sofia agrees.

For the first while, Sofia enjoys what is essentially a paid vacation, spending most of her time alone in the house with the friendly maid Tati. Eventually, though, she discovers hidden cameras in the house, and confronts Beatriz over it. As a compromise, Beatriz agrees to disable the indoor cameras, but leaves the outdoor cameras active, arguing that it’s for protection. Sofia begins to notice Beatriz being overly attached to the unborn child. Sofia’s phone also goes missing, cutting off contact with Nacho and the outside world.

Cristina’s daily schedule for Sofia comes to involve strenuous activity, wearing Sofia down to the point of exhaustion. When she voices these concerns to Beatriz, Beatriz forces her to continue her routine regardless, worried for the baby’s health. She gets a dog for Sofia in the hopes that it will placate her increasing unhappiness, only made worse by the sudden disappearance of Tati, which Beatriz excuses by saying that she was let go.

While Beatriz is at work one day, her employee, Belén, discovers that Sofia fabricated her entire application with false references and made-up degrees. Furious, Beatriz vents about this to Cristina, who talks her out of revealing this knowledge to Sofia. When Beatriz snaps at Sofia for sitting outside for too long, Sofia gets fed up and tries to escape the property, but ends up hurting herself. Beatriz rushes home and drugs her after confirming that the baby is okay. Talking to Cristina, they arrange for a C-Section to take place the next day.

Meanwhile, Nacho has been trying to reach Sofia, and has become desperate. After raiding Beatriz’s workplace for her address, Belén calls Beatriz and alerts her that Nacho is on his way. After Nacho promises Sofia through the house’s intercom that he’ll find a better signal and call the police, Beatriz runs him over with her car and kills him. Afterward, Sofia pretends to be subservient to Beatriz, lulling her into a false sense of security so that she is able to knock her unconscious during dinner.

Sofia restrains Beatriz and accuses her of planning to kill her after the birth, which Beatriz vehemently denies. Sofia takes her cash and the contract she signed, and threatens to expose Beatriz should she come after her. However, Beatriz breaks free of her restraints and attacks Sofia, who stabs her to death. As Sofia walks down the country road, her water breaks, and the film fades to black.

== Cast ==
- Aitana Sánchez-Gijón as Beatriz
- Cumelén Sanz as Sofía
- Álex Pastrana as Nacho
- Pedro Casablanc as Julio
- Vanessa Rasero as Cristina
- María Fernández as Belén
- Younes Bachir as Hamid
- Rocío Setjo as Tati
- Lucía Quinteiro as Ayudante nueva
- Daniel Prim as Alberto
- Adán Redondo as Ayudante 1
- Salomé Jiménez as Carmen
- Niko Verona as Cura
- Patricia Fuertes as Empleada 2
- Mariela Rafaela Martínez Campos as Encargada
- Mehdi Regragui as Jonathan
- Alicia Martínez as Modelo maniquí

== Production ==
La jefa is Fran Torres' debut feature film. The screenplay was penned by Laura Sarmiento. Produced by Feelgood Media, Francisco Torres Quincoces, Hugo-Daniel Boyero Garmendia, Penúltima Toma AIE, Teoponte PC and Audiovisuales del Monte, filming took place in 2021, shooting in Madrid in July.

== Release ==
Distributed by Filmax, it was theatrically released in Spain on 29 April 2022, grossing €22,400 at the domestic box office. It was released on-demand by Netflix on 31 August 2022 as Under Her Control.

== Critical response ==
Pablo Vázquez of Fotogramas rated the film with 4 out of 5 stars praising "its twisted and playful nature, worthy of the best exploitation cinema", assessing the give-and-take between a Joan Crawford-esque Sánchez-Gijón and the "young and enchanting" Cumelén Sanz to be the engine of the film.

Oti Rodríguez Marchante of ABC scored 2 out of 5 stars, writing that "the way in which the plot is complexified is overly forced, but it is easy to see the place towards which the plot is tumbling".

Carmen L. Lobo of La Razón gave it 3 out of 5 stars, praising "an always stupendous" Sánchez-Gijón as well as Cumelén Sanz, while also observing the similarities of the story with that of The Daughter.

== See also ==
- List of Spanish films of 2022
