= My Sweet =

2001 film

- Spanish: Mi dulce
- Directed by: Jesús Mora
- Written by: Iván Morales
- Starring: Aitana Sánchez-Gijón; Santiago Ramos; Bárbara Goenaga; Unax Ugalde; Arianna Puello
- Cinematography: Federico Ribes
- Edited by: Iván Aledo
- Music by: Alfonso Vilallonga
- Production companies: Tusitala; Media Park
- Distributed by: Nirvana Films
- Release date: 4 May 2001
- Running time: 93 minutes
- Country: Spain
- Language: Spanish

My Sweet (Spanish: Mi dulce) or My Sweetheart is a 2001 Spanish drama film directed by Jesús Mora. It was entered into the 23rd Moscow International Film Festival.

== Plot ==
Set in El Raval, the plot explores the relationship between hard-boiled cop Ángela and her rebel younger sister Laura.

== Cast ==
- Aitana Sánchez-Gijón as Ángela
- Bárbara Goenaga as Laura
- Santiago Ramos as Fermín
- Unax Ugalde as Óscar
- Arianna Puello as Jamila (as Arianna Puello 'Ari')
- Marco Cocci as Scratch
- Francesc Orella as Antonio
- Marcial Álvarez as Negro
- Bruno Bergonzini as Rata
- Boris Ruiz as José
- Fermí Reixach as Mario
- Isak Férriz as Willy

== Production ==
The film is a Tusitala and Media Park production.

== Reception ==
Jonathan Holland of Variety lamented that the "well-intentioned" low-budget film "starts out strongly enough but fades as the cliches and implausibilities kick in".

== See also ==
- List of Spanish films of 2001
