= Adolfo Suárez, el presidente =

Spanish television series

- Genre: Biopic
- Written by: Juan Carlos Rubio; Carlos Asorey Brey
- Directed by: Sergio Cabrera
- Starring: Ginés García Millán
- Country of origin: Spain
- Original language: Spanish
- No. of seasons: 1
- No. of episodes: 2

Production
- Production companies: Antena 3 Films; Europroducciones

Original release
- Network: Antena 3
- Release: 27 January – 3 February 2010

Adolfo Suárez, el presidente is a Spanish biopic television movie aired as two-part miniseries directed by Sergio Cabrera. It originally aired on Antena 3 from 27 January to 3 February 2010. It deals about the life of prime minister Adolfo Suárez, who is portrayed by Ginés García Millán.

== Plot ==
The fiction dramatises the Adolfo Suárez's political career and personal life during the Francoist dictatorship and the Transition up until his resignation as prime minister in 1981.

== Cast ==
- Ginés García Millán as Adolfo Suárez.
- Toni Acosta as Amparo Illana.
- Fernando Cayo as Don Juan Carlos.
- Jesús Noguero as Abril Martorell.
- Juana Acosta as Carmen Díez de Rivera.
- Ramón Barea as Alfonso Armada.
- Mario Pardo as Gutiérrez Mellado.
- Mariano Venancio as Torcuato Fernández-Miranda.
- Eusebio Lázaro as López Rodó.
- Francisco Merino as Francisco Franco.
- Pepo Oliva as Herrero Tejedor.
- Pep Cortés as Santiago Carrillo.
- Luis Rallo as Felipe González.
- Julio Vélez as Emiliano.

== Production and release ==
The series was written by Juan Carlos Rubio and Carlos Asorey Brey and directed by Sergio Cabrera. Produced by Antena 3 Films alongside Europroducciones, filming started in late August 2009. It was shot in the provinces of Segovia, Ávila and the Madrid region. Consisting of two episodes featuring a running time of around 70 minutes, the miniseries premiered on 27 January 2010. The first part earned 3,059,000 viewers (15.6% audience share), whereas the second part, aired on 3 February 2010, earned 2,832,000 viewers (16.2% audience share).
