= Silvia's Gift =

- Theatrical release poster
- Spanish: El regalo de Silvia
- Screenplay by: Dionisio Pérez; Pilar Gutiérrez; Miguel A. Gómez
- Produced by: Luis Á. Ramírez; Rafael Álvarez; Xosé Zapata
- Starring: Bárbara Goenaga; Luis Tosar; Víctor Clavijo; Adriana Domínguez; Ginés García Millán
- Cinematography: Alfonso Parra
- Edited by: Pedro Santos
- Music by: Jorge Aliaga
- Production companies: Lorelei Producciones; Imval; El Medano; Calatambo Producciones; Cinemate
- Distributed by: Lolafilms
- Release dates: May 2003 (Málaga); 18 July 2003 (Spain)
- Countries: Spain; Chile; Portugal
- Language: Spanish

Silvia's Gift (Spanish: El regalo de Silvia) is a 2003 Spanish-Chilean-Portuguese drama film directed by Dionisio Pérez. It stars Bárbara Goenaga, Luis Tosar, Víctor Clavijo and Adriana Domínguez alongside Ginés García Millán.

== Plot ==
Silvia, a teenager, has made the decision to end her life and donate her organs - heart, corneas, and liver - to three anonymous people. Prior to carrying out her decision, she records a video diary, confessing her most intimate thoughts of the past year. Carlos, a middle-aged father with an uncertain career, receives her heart. Inés, a girl born blind, receives her corneas, and Mateo, a young man living on the edge of the law, receives her liver. For all of them, this marks the beginning of a new life. However, the reason behind Silvia's decision remains unclear. The video diary is intertwined with the daily lives of the three recipients, gradually revealing the answers.

== Cast ==
- Bárbara Goenaga as Silvia
- Luis Tosar as Carlos
- Víctor Clavijo as Mateo
- Adriana Domínguez as Inés
- Ginés García Millán as Román
- Katyna Huberman
- María Bouzas as Conchi
- Pablo Galán as Rubén

== Production ==
A joint effort by production companies from Spain, Chile and Portugal, the film was produced by Lorelei Producciones, Imval, El Medano, Calatambo Producciones and Cinemate in association with TVG. Filming began in A Coruña in June 2002.

== Release ==
The film screened at the 6th Málaga Film Festival's main competition in May 2003. Distributed by Lolafilms, the film was theatrically released in Spain on 18 July 2003.

== Reception ==
Jonathan Holland of Variety deemed the film (an "elegant meditation on sacrifice") to be "impressively scripted, well-played and thought-provoking".

== Accolades ==
Year	Award	Category	Nominee(s)	Result	Ref.
2004	18th Goya Awards	Best New Actor	Víctor Clavijo	Nominated	

== See also ==
- List of Spanish films of 2003
- List of Portuguese films of 2003
