= Félix (TV series) =

Spanish television series

- Genre: Romantic thriller
- Created by: Cesc Gay
- Screenplay by: Cesc Gay; Tomás Aragay
- Directed by: Cesc Gay
- Starring: Leonardo Sbaraglia; Mi Hoa Lee; Pere Arquillué; Ginés García Millán
- Composers: Arnau Bataller; Jordi Prats
- Country of origin: Spain
- Original language: Spanish
- No. of seasons: 1
- No. of episodes: 6

Production
- Executive producers: Domingo Corral; Marta Esteban; Ismael Calleja; Fran Araújo
- Cinematography: Andreu Rebés
- Running time: 45–60 minutes
- Production company: Movistar+

Original release
- Release: 6 April 2018

Félix is a Spanish romantic thriller limited television series with comedy elements created and directed by Cesc Gay. It stars Leonardo Sbaraglia, Mi Hoa Lee, Pere Arquillué and Ginés García Millán. It was released by Movistar+ on 6 April 2018.

== Premise ==
Set in Andorra, the fiction follows the story of Félix, a literature teacher who falls in love with Julia as soon as he meets her. Barely three days after, she disappears, changing the life of Félix forever. Together with Óscar, Félix then embarks on a quixotic quest to find her.

== Cast ==
Starring

- Leonardo Sbaraglia as Félix.
- Mi Hoa Lee as Julia / May Lin.
- Pere Arquillué as Óscar, Félix's sidekick.
- Ginés García Millán as Mario, an Andorran police agent.

Other

- Pedro Casablanc.
- Carlos Hipólito.
- Ana Wagener.
- Julius Cotter

== Production and release ==
Created by Cesc Gay, Félix is a Movistar+ original production. The screenplay was written by Cesc Gay together with Tomás Aragay. Arnau Bataller and Jordi Prats composed the score. Domingo Corral, Marta Esteban, Ismael Calleja and Fran Araújo were credited as executive producers.

Filming started in March 2017. Following 11 weeks in Andorra, it moved to Barcelona. It was wrapped after 20 weeks. The series consists of 6 episodes with a running time ranging from 45 to 60 minutes.

It was released on 6 April 2018.

Series	Episodes	Originally released	Network
1	6	6 April 2018	Movistar+

== Awards and nominations ==
Year	Award	Category	Nominee(s)	Result	Ref.
2018	6th MiM Series Awards	Best Miniseries or TV Movie		Nominated	
