= The Backwoods =

- Directed by: Koldo Serra
- Written by: Jon Sagalá; Koldo Serra
- Produced by: Iker Monfort; Julio Fernández
- Starring: Gary Oldman; Virginie Ledoyen; Paddy Considine; Aitana Sánchez-Gijón
- Cinematography: Unax Mendia
- Edited by: Javier Ruiz Caldera
- Music by: Fernando Velázquez
- Production companies: Filmax Entertainment; Monfort Producciones
- Distributed by: Lionsgate; Filmax SA
- Release dates: 24 September 2006 (San Sebastián Film Festival); 16 February 2007 (Spain)
- Running time: 97 minutes
- Countries: Spain; United Kingdom; France
- Language: English

The Backwoods, alternately known in Spanish as Bosque de Sombras, is a 2006 Spanish-British thriller film directed and co-written by the Spanish director Koldo Serra.

Set in 1978 in the Basque Country, Northern Spain, The Backwoods tells the story of two married couples staying in an isolated house in the woods. Once belonging to his Basque grandmother, Englishman Paul (Gary Oldman) has purchased the house as a holiday retreat for himself and his Spanish wife Isabel (Aitana Sánchez-Gijón) . They are joined by fellow Englishman Norman (Paddy Considine) and his wife Lucy (Virginie Ledoyen), who are hoping the holiday will help save their marriage. While out hunting, Norman and Paul discover a deformed girl locked away in an abandoned building; deciding to rescue her, they take her back to their holiday home. The following day, a group of armed local men come to the house searching for the girl, whom they claim is their niece.

Critics noted similarities between The Backwoods and earlier thrillers such as Deliverance and Straw Dogs.

== Plot ==
Set in the summer of 1978, Lucy and Norman, a young married couple whose relationship is going through a rough patch, join Norman's boss, Paul, and his Spanish wife, Isabel, on holiday in Basque Country. Located in an isolated area in the middle of the forest, Paul's ancestral home seems the ideal spot for a quiet stay and the chance for Lucy and Norman to sort out their emotional problems. However, their peace is shattered when Paul and Norman discover a cabin in the forest in which a girl with ectrodactyly is imprisoned. Their attempts to take the girl to the police are hindered by the difficulties of the heavily wooded terrain and the intervention of a group of villagers who are determined to keep the girl locked away for good.

== Cast ==
- Gary Oldman as Paul
- Virginie Ledoyen as Lucy
- Paddy Considine as Norman
- Aitana Sánchez-Gijón as Isabel
- Lluís Homar as Paco
- Yaiza Esteve as Nerea
- Álex Angulo as Jose Andrés
- Patxi Bisquert as José Luis
- Andrés Gertrúdix as Antonio
- Savitri Ceballos as Hija de Jose Andres
- José Andrés Zalguegui as The Bartender

== Reviews ==
Based on nine reviews, the film garnered an aggregate rating of 63% on the Rotten Tomatoes website.
