= Gun City =

- Spanish: La sombra de la ley
- Directed by: Dani de la Torre
- Written by: Patxi Amezcua
- Produced by: Emma Lustres; Mercedes Gamero
- Starring: Luis Tosar; Michelle Jenner; Vicente Romero; Manolo Solo; Paco Tous; Jaime Lorente; Adriana Torrebejano; Ernesto Alterio
- Production companies: Vaca Films; Atresmedia Cine; La Ley del Plomo A.I.E.; Playtime Production
- Distributed by: Hispano FoxFilm
- Release dates: 5 October 2018 (Sitges); 11 October 2018 (Spain)
- Countries: Spain; France
- Language: Spanish

Gun City (Spanish: La sombra de la ley) is a 2018 Spanish-French action thriller film directed by Dani de la Torre and written by Patxi Amezcua. Set in 1921 Barcelona, the plot displays anarchist struggle and police brutality as a backdrop. The cast features Luis Tosar, Michelle Jenner, Vicente Romero, Manolo Solo, Paco Tous, Jaime Lorente, Adriana Torrebejano and Ernesto Alterio.

== Plot ==
In Barcelona, 1921, tensions are high between the police and local anarchists. A group of gunmen rob an MZA train and steal its cargo of military automatic weapons. Detectives Rediú, Tísico, and Beltrán from the local police’s Intelligence Brigade lead the investigation of the robbery, and they are soon joined by agent Aníbal Uriarte, who was sent from Madrid. The detectives demonstrate their brutal methods to Uriarte by beating and then murdering the train driver, whom they suspect was part of the robbery. The detectives visit the Eden nightclub, where Rediú introduces Uriarte to the club’s owner and local gangster El Barón, who also does business with the corrupt members of the Intelligence Brigade.

The next day, a women’s equality march is forcibly repressed by the police. News starts to trickle in about a serious military defeat in Morocco. Commissioner Verdaguer announces that if the stolen weapons are not found within 72 hours, the military governor General Martínez Anido will send troops into the streets of Barcelona. Rediú and Uriarte visit the MZA factory, where the workers are on strike. The strikers are led by older anarchist Salvador Ortiz, whose peaceful protest methods are challenged by the younger anarchist León, who advocates for a violent revolution. MZA president García Serrano points the detectives towards the company’s accountant Guillem, but he is soon found murdered. That night, the detectives are attacked by anarchists armed with army submachine guns, but escape major injury.

Uriarte meets with El Barón and offers to inform on Rediú to him in exchange for money and to gain his trust. At the MZA factory, Uriarte saves Ortiz from a gang of thugs sent by El Barón at the request of Serrano. Rediú attempts to arrest El Barón in order to take over his rackets, but is foiled by Uriarte. Uriarte seeks information from Ortiz, where he befriends his daughter Sara, who following the repression of the women’s march has joined León’s anarchist action brigade. A bank robbery organized by León goes wrong, and Sara is forced to surrender and show the detectives the location of the automatic weapons. Following a confrontation at the now-empty weapons cache, Uriarte escapes with Sara and Beltrán’s notebook, during which Tísico is killed. Sara and her father go into hiding at a farmhouse outside Barcelona. Uriarte is nearly killed by El Barón’s right-hand-man Mallorquín, who before dying reveals that he killed Guillem on El Barón’s orders in order to prevent top Eden dancer Lola from leaving the nightclub with Guillem.

Uriarte presents Verdaguer with Beltrán’s notebook, which details the Intelligence Brigade’s crimes. Beltrán is arrested and Rediú commits suicide. Uriarte secretly informs Lola of El Barón’s treachery, before convincing El Barón to show him the stolen weapons cache, which is guarded by soldiers. Uriarte meets with his boss, a government minister, to reveal the results of his investigation: General Anido had his men rob the MZA train, and gave the weapons to El Barón to sell to the anarchists in order to increase violence and justify a military intervention. The minister believes a civil war sparked by the anarchist clashes and the military disaster in Morocco will be good for him politically, and he orders Uriarte back to Madrid. Ortiz is murdered by León, who uses his death as a rallying cry for a violent revolution.

Uriarte tells Verdaguer that the weapons are being held at Eden and that the deal is going down that night. At the deal, El Barón lets slip in front of Sara that León killed her father, before the anarchists double cross the gangsters. As the police raid Eden, they get into a shootout with the gangsters and anarchists, where Verdaguer and Serrano are killed. While attempting to escape with his money, El Barón is killed by Lola, who takes the money for herself. Uriarte chases down León and is nearly killed when his gun jams, but Sara saves him by shooting León.

The next day, Uriarte returns to Madrid. On-screen text notes that after General Primo de Rivera’s coup d'état on 13 September 1923, General Anido was appointed Minister of the Interior.

== Cast ==
- Luis Tosar as Aníbal Uriarte
- Michelle Jenner as Sara
- Vicente Romero as Inspector Rediú
- Manolo Solo as El Barón
- Paco Tous as Salvador Ortiz
- Adriana Torrebejano as Lola
- Pep Tosar as Comisario Verdaguer
- Jaime Lorente as León
- Ernesto Alterio as Tísico
- José Manuel Poga as Mallorquín
- Fredi Leis as Beltrán
- William Miller as García Serrano
- Fernando Cayo as Ministro

== Production ==
In Autumn 2017, Playtime was announced to co-produce and to handle international sales on Gun City, a period Spanish thriller, directed by Dani de la Torre and produced by Spain's Vaca Films Studio and Atresmedia Cine/La Ley del Plomo with Playtime Prods. Veteran Spanish actor Luis Tosar and up-and-comer Michelle Jenner starred. Production budget was 5 million euros ($5.89 million). The film was shot in locations of Barcelona and Galicia (including the city of A Coruña and Monforte de Lemos).

== Release ==
The film screened at the 51st Sitges Film Festival on 5 October 2018. Distributed by Hispano FoxFilm, it was theatrically released in Spain on 11 October 2018.

The film was released on 31 October 2018 by Netflix.

== Accolades ==
Year	Award	Category	Nominee(s)	Result	Ref.
2019	11th Gaudí Awards	Best Costume Design	Clara Bilbao	Nominated	
2019	11th Gaudí Awards	Best Visual Effects	Félix Bergés, Lluís Rivera	Nominated	
2019	11th Gaudí Awards	Best Makeup and Hairstyles	Noe Montes, Raquel Fidalgo	Nominated	
2019	33rd Goya Awards	Best Original Score	Manuel Riveiro, Xavi Font	Nominated	
2019	33rd Goya Awards	Best Cinematography	Josu Incháustegui	Won	
2019	33rd Goya Awards	Best Makeup and Hairstyles	Raquel Fidalgo, Noé Montes, Alberto Hortas	Nominated	
2019	33rd Goya Awards	Best Art Direction	Juan Pedro de Gaspar	Won	
2019	33rd Goya Awards	Best Special Effects	Lluís Rivera, Félix Bergés	Nominated	
2019	33rd Goya Awards	Best Costume Design	Clara Bilbao	Won	
2019	17th Mestre Mateo Awards	Best Film		Won	
2019	17th Mestre Mateo Awards	Best Director	Dani de la Torre	Won	
2019	17th Mestre Mateo Awards	Best Screenplay		Nominated	
2019	17th Mestre Mateo Awards	Best Actress	Michelle Jenner	Nominated	
2019	17th Mestre Mateo Awards	Best Actor	Luis Tosar	Won	
2019	17th Mestre Mateo Awards	Best Supporting Actress	Adriana Torrebejano	Nominated	
2019	17th Mestre Mateo Awards	Best Supporting Actor	Ernesto Alterio	Nominated	
2019	17th Mestre Mateo Awards	Best Cinematography		Nominated	
2019	17th Mestre Mateo Awards	Best Art Direction	Juan Pedro de Gaspar	Won	
2019	17th Mestre Mateo Awards	Best Production Supervision	María Liaño	Won	
2019	17th Mestre Mateo Awards	Best Makeup and Hairstyles	Raquel Hidalgo, Noé Montes	Won	
2019	17th Mestre Mateo Awards	Best Editing	Jorge Coira	Won	
2019	17th Mestre Mateo Awards	Best Original Score	Manu Riveiro, Xavi Font	Won	
2019	17th Mestre Mateo Awards	Best Sound	David Machado, James Muñoz, José Antonio Manovel	Won	
2019	17th Mestre Mateo Awards	Best Costume Design	Clara Bilbao	Won	

== See also ==
- List of Spanish films of 2018
