= My Brother's Gun =

- Theatrical release poster
- Spanish: La pistola de mi hermano
- Directed by: Ray Loriga
- Screenplay by: Ray Loriga
- Based on: Caídos del cielo by Ray Loriga
- Produced by: Enrique Cerezo
- Starring: Daniel González; Nico Bidásolo; Andrés Gertrúdix; Karra Elejalde; Anna Galiena; Viggo Mortensen; Christina Rosenvinge
- Cinematography: José Luis Alcaine
- Edited by: J. María Biurrún
- Music by: Christina Rosenvinge
- Production company: Enrique Cerezo PC
- Distributed by: United International Pictures
- Release dates: October 1997 (Seminci); 14 November 1997 (Spain)
- Country: Spain
- Language: Spanish

My Brother's Gun (Spanish: La pistola de mi hermano) is a 1997 Spanish film directed and written by Ray Loriga in his feature-length directorial debut. It stars Daniel González, Nico Bidásolo and Andrés Gertrúdix, with Anna Galiena, Karra Elejalde, Viggo Mortensen, and Christina Rosenvinge in supporting roles.

== Plot ==
After shooting and killing a security guard in a mall, a young man flees alongside a girl who has just attempted suicide.

== Cast ==
- Daniel González as Young Man
- Nico Bidásolo as Girl
- Andrés Gertrúdix as Brother
- Karra Elejalde as Inspector
- Anna Galiena as Mother
- Viggo Mortensen as Juanito
- Christina Rosenvinge as Alicia
- Maxi Iglesias
- Manuel Caro
- Pepo Oliva

== Production ==
The film is an adaptation of Loriga's novel Caídos del cielo as well as the Generation X novelist's debut feature; Loriga had previously been involved in the film industry in the writing of Live Flesh. The film was produced by Enrique Cerezo, and it had the participation/collaboration of TVE and Canal+.

== Release ==
The film was presented at the 42nd Valladolid International Film Festival (Seminci) in October 1997. Distributed by United International Pictures, the film was theatrically released in Spain on 14 November 1997.

== Reception ==
Jonathan Holland of Variety deemed the "languid Hispanic reprise of pics such as Kalifornia and Natural Born Killers" to feature "considerably more style than substance" despite being "beautifully shot and edited".

Ángel Fernández-Santos of El País considered that despite featuring a "lively and rich narrative material", Loriga deals with it "clumsily", as the helmer rushed into a "reckless journey from literary to cinematographic language, without mastering the articulations of the latter".

== See also ==
- List of Spanish films of 1997
