= Bárbara Goenaga =

Spanish actress

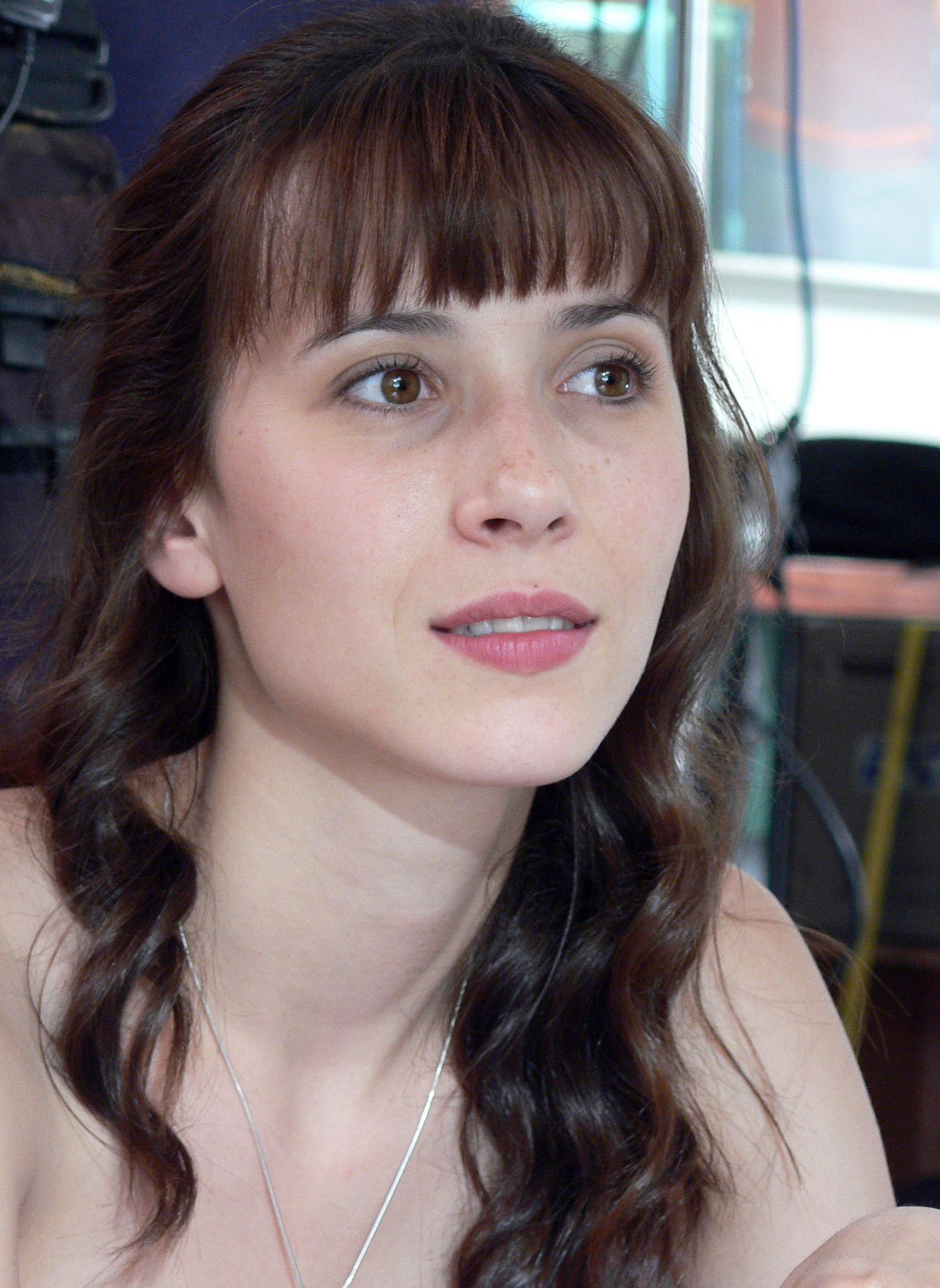
- Goenaga in 3:19 (2007)
- Born: Bárbara Goenaga Bilbao; 20 July 1983 (age 42); San Sebastián, Basque Country, Spain
- Occupation: Actress

Bárbara Goenaga Bilbao (born 20 July 1983) is a Spanish actress. She was nominated to the Goya Award for Best New Actress for her performance in the 2007 comedy-drama film Oviedo Express.

== Biography ==
Bárbara Goenaga was born in San Sebastián, Gipuzkoa, on 20 July 1983. She is the daughter of painter Juan Luis Goenaga and the niece of actress, writer and film director Aizpea Goenaga. She started her acting career in her homeland, appearing in series like Bai Horixe!, Beni eta Marini and Duplex along with her aunt Aizpea Goenaga. In 1994, she started working in long-running, popular Basque language television soap opera Goenkale where she spent six years interpreting Ainhoa.

She moved to Madrid at age 16, where she participated in series like El Comisario. She also featured in the series El grupo. In 1992 she made her feature film debut in Arantxa Lazkano's Urte ilunak. From year 2000 onwards, she featured in many projects, both in cinema and television: Silvia's Gift (2002), directed by Dionisio Pérez, Amor en defensa propia (2004), by Rafa Russo, La luna en botella (2006) under the direction of Grojo or Oviedo Express (2007), directed by Gonzalo Suárez. In television, she has taken part of popular series like Vientos de agua, At the Edge of the Law (2005) or A medias (2002).

In 2008, her work in Oviedo Express nominated her for a Goya Award in the category Best New Actress.

She has a son from her previous relationship with actor Óscar Jaenada. She also has two sons with politician and husband Borja Sémper.

== Filmography ==
=== Film ===
Year	Film	Role	Notes	Ref.
1992	Urte ilunak			
2000	Mi dulce (My Sweet)	Laura		
2003	El regalo de Silvia (Silvia's Gift)	Silvia		
2006	Amor en defensa propia	Bettina		
2006	Mia Sarah	Speaker	Voice	
2007	La luna en botella	Alicia		
2007	Anastezsi	Eleanora		
2007	3:19	Lisa		
2007	Oviedo Express	Emma		
2007	Los cronocrímenes (Timecrimes)	Girl		
2008	La buena nueva (The Good News)	Margari		
2008	No me pidas que te bese, porque te besaré			
2008	A Tram in SP	Roma		
2009	Sukalde kontuak			
2010	Agnosía (Agnosia)	Joana Prats		
2010	Ruiflec, le village des ombres	Lila		
2010	Estrellas que alcanzar	Victoria		
2010	Sin retorno (No Return)	Natalia		
2012	Bypass	Nerea		
2015	La punta del iceberg (The Tip of the Iceberg)	Gabriela Benassar		
2015	33 días			
2015	Picadero	Ane		

=== Television ===
Year	Film	Role	Notes	Ref.
1986	Bai Horixe!			
1991	Beni eta Marini			
1993	Duplex			
1994-1999	Goenkale	Ainhoa		
1999	El Comisario	Celia	1 episode	
1999	Condenadas a entenderse	Mercedes	2 episodes	
2000	Hospital Central	Alicia	1 episode	
2001	El grupo	Arantxa Ortega	11 episodes	
2002	A medias	Alex	10 episodes	
2003	Una nueva vida	Eva	1 episode	
2005	Al filo de la ley	Virginia Nuñez	1 episode	
2005	Vientos de agua	Felisa	6 episodes	
2009	23-F: Historia de una traición	Arantza	2 episodes	
2013	El don de alba	Ana	1 episode	
2013	Amar es para siempre	Inés Saavedra Bermejo	35 episodes	
2014	Cuéntame cómo pasó	Lucía	6 episodes	
2022	La noche más larga (The Longest Night)	Elisa Montero		
