= I Will Survive (1999 film) =

- Spanish film poster by Oscar Mariné
- Spanish: Sobreviviré
- Directed by: Alfonso Albacete; David Menkes
- Written by: Alfonso Albacete; Lucía Etxebarría; David Menkes
- Produced by: Francisco Ramos
- Starring: Emma Suárez; Juan Diego Botto; Mirtha Ibarra; Rosana Pastor; Manuel Manquiña; Maite Blasco; Alex Brendemühl; Javier Martín; Adrià Collado; Elena Irureta; Alberto San Juan; José Manuel Cervino
- Cinematography: Gonzalo Fernández-Berridi
- Edited by: Miguel Ángel Santamaría
- Music by: Paco Ortega
- Production companies: Aurum Producciones; El Paso PC; Películas Frenéticas
- Release date: 19 November 1999
- Running time: 102 minutes
- Country: Spain
- Language: Spanish

I Will Survive (Spanish: Sobreviviré) is a 1999 Spanish romantic comedy-drama film directed by Alfonso Albacete and David Menkes, starring Emma Suárez and Juan Diego Botto, playing a straight woman and a gay man who fall in love. The film and especially the soundtrack was very successful in Spain.

== Plot ==
Marga, a pregnant and widowed woman, is going through a streak of bad luck. Via her friendship with Rosa, she begins to rebuild her confidence, but faces difficulties. After beginning a relationship with Iñaki, an attractive gay sculptor who is ten years younger than her, her life begins to improve. Initially friends, they develop a sexual relationship, something they both thought impossible because Iñaki is gay.

== Cast ==
- Emma Suárez as Marga
- Juan Diego Botto as Iñaki
- Mirtha Ibarra as Rosa
- Rosana Pastor as Tini
- Manuel Manquiña as Rolando
- Àlex Brendemühl as José
- Adrià Collado as Roberto
- Maite Blasco
- Javier Martín
- Elena Irureta
- Alberto San Juan
- José Manuel Cervino

== Production ==
The film is an Aurum Producciones, El Paso PC, and Películas Frenéticas production.

== Release ==
The film was released theatrically in Spain on 19 November 1999.

== See also ==
- List of Spanish films of 1999
