= Yerma (1998 film) =

- Theatrical release poster
- Directed by: Pilar Távora
- Screenplay by: Pilar Távora
- Based on: Yerma by Federico García Lorca
- Starring: Aitana Sánchez-Gijón; Juan Diego; Irene Papas
- Cinematography: Acácio de Almeida
- Edited by: Pilar Távora
- Music by: Vicente Sanchís
- Production company: Artimagen Producciones
- Distributed by: Columbia TriStar Films de España
- Release dates: September 1998 (San Sebastián); 26 February 1999 (Spain)
- Country: Spain
- Language: Spanish
- Budget: 250 million ₧
- Box office: 44 million ₧

Yerma is a 1998 Spanish drama film directed and written by Pilar Távora which stars Aitana Sánchez-Gijón, alongside Juan Diego and Irene Papas. It is an adaptation of the play of the same name by Federico García Lorca.

== Plot ==
A tragedy set in rural Andalusia, the plot follows the plight of a childless woman obsessed with the prospect of having offspring, torn between hopefulness and desperation.

== Cast ==
- Aitana Sánchez-Gijón as Yerma
- Juan Diego as Juan
- Irene Papas as Vieja
- Mercedes Bernal as María
- Jesús Cabrero as Víctor
- María Galiana as Dolores
- Ana Fernández as Lavandera

== Production ==
The film was produced by Artimagen Producciones with the collaboration of Canal Sur Televisión and TVE. It was fully shot in Andalusia, in the provinces of Huelva and Seville.

== Release ==
The film screened at the 1998 San Sebastián Film Festival as well as in Puerto Rico and Chicago. It was domestically distributed by Columbia Tri-Star Films de España S.A. Despite the regional support from the Andalusian regional administration, the film did not fare well at the box office, grossing around 44 million ₧ (80,000 admissions) against a 250 million ₧ budget.

== See also ==
- List of Spanish films of 1999

== Bibliography ==
- García Jambrina, Luis (2002). "Análisis comparativo de "Yerma", de Federico García Lorca y Pilar Távora". Zeitschrift: Versants: Revue suisse des littératures romanes = Rivista svizzera delle letterature romanze = Revista suiza de literaturas románicas. 42 – via E-Periodica.
- Gómez Pérez, Francisco (2001). "Yerma: distintas visiones de una tragedia andaluza" (PDF). Andalucía: una civilización para el cine. Seville: Padilla Libros. pp. 71–94. ISBN 8484341313 – via Universidad de Sevilla.
- Trenzado Romero, Manuel (2000). "La construcción de la identidad andaluza y la cultura de masas: el caso del cine andaluz" (PDF). Revista de Estudios Regionales (58). Málaga: Universidades Públicas de Andalucía: 185–207. ISSN 0213-7585 – via Redalyc.
