= Love in Self Defense =

- Theatrical release poster
- Spanish: Amor en defensa propia
- Directed by: Rafa Russo
- Screenplay by: Rafa Russo
- Produced by: Carina Pardavila; Jaume Roures
- Starring: Ana Fernández; Gustavo Garzón; Andrés Gertrúdix; Manuel Morón; Ginés Gª Millán; Carlos Kaniowsky; Bárbara Goenaga
- Cinematography: Daniel Aranyó
- Edited by: Fernando Guariniello
- Music by: Rafa Russo
- Production companies: Mediapro; NBCUniversal Global Networks
- Distributed by: United International Pictures
- Release dates: 23 March 2006 (Málaga); 9 June 2006 (Spain)
- Country: Spain
- Language: Spanish

Love in Self Defense (Spanish: Amor en defensa propia) is a 2006 Spanish romantic drama film written, directed, and scored by Rafa Russo in his directorial feature debut. It stars Ana Fernández and Gustavo Garzón.

== Plot ==
Set in Spain's eastern coast, the plot follows the twisted relationship established between an idle woman claiming to be a painter (Adriana) and an Argentinian former football player turned scammer (Rubén) upon their meeting in a bar.

== Cast ==
- Ana Fernández as Adriana
- Gustavo Garzón as Rubén
- Andrés Gertrúdix as Damián
- Manuel Morón as Ernesto
- Ginés García Millán as Basilio
- Carlos Kaniowsky
- Bárbara Goenaga
- Pere Arquillué

== Production ==
The film was produced by Mediapro alongside NBCUniversal Global Networks, and it had the participation of Antena 3. It was shot in the provinces of Barcelona and Tarragona.

== Release ==
The film premiered in competition at the 9th Málaga Film Festival in March 2006. Distributed by UIP, it was theatrically released in Spain on 9 June 2006.

== Reception ==
Jonathan Holland of Variety assessed that the "absorbing, slow-burning" film stars out "like a scam movie", "quickly mutating into something far more distinctive and emotionally complex", shining through its "commitment to its offbeat premise and its emotional truth".

Casimiro Torreiro of El País considered that the film abounds in situations that are very difficult to capture on film, failing at "building up plausible psychologies for its characters".

== See also ==
- List of Spanish films of 2006
