= Jealousy (1999 film) =

- Theatrical release poster
- Spanish: Celos
- Directed by: Vicente Aranda
- Screenplay by: Álvaro del Amo; Vicente Aranda
- Produced by: José Luis Escolar
- Starring: Daniel Giménez Cacho; Aitana Sánchez-Gijón; María Botto; Luis Tosar
- Cinematography: José Luis Alcaine
- Edited by: Teresa Font
- Music by: José Nieto
- Production companies: Sogetel; Calle Cruzada
- Distributed by: Warner Sogefilms
- Release date: 3 September 1999
- Running time: 105 minutes
- Country: Spain
- Language: Spanish
- Box office: €1,286,836

Jealousy (Spanish: Celos) is a 1999 Spanish erotic thriller film directed by Vicente Aranda from a screenplay by Aranda and Álvaro del Amo. It stars Daniel Giménez Cacho and Aitana Sánchez-Gijón alongside María Botto and Luis Tosar.

== Plot ==
Carmen and Antonio are a young couple in love, planning their upcoming wedding. Carmen works in an orange processing factory and Antonio is a long-distance truck driver for the same firm. While driving his truck on a stormy day, Antonio comes across an old picture of a group of people, among whom is Carmen looking friendly with a good-looking young man, who has his arm around her shoulder. When Antonio asks his girlfriend who was the man in the picture, Carmen quickly dismisses Antonio's doubts. The man in the shot was nobody important, she reassures him. In any case, the photograph was taken long before she met Antonio. Unhappy with that answer and feeling that his fiance is hiding something from him, Antonio looks for the truth elsewhere.

He questions Luis, his best friend who introduced him to Carmen. Luis, a fellow truck driver, advises him to forget the man and the picture and instead thank his luck to be on the eve of marrying the best-looking girl in town who happens to love him. Unconvinced, Antonio visits Carmen's best friend, Cinta, a salesgirl in a shoe shop. She tells him that the guy was José—someone she, not Carmen, bedded. But Antonio is still suspicious. Knowing that Cinta is a big flirt now in a relationship with her boss after dumping Luis, Antonio does not really believe her. Consumed by increasing jealousy Antonio explodes and violently confronts Carmen who breaks up their engagement the same day she was trying out her wedding gown.

Remorseful of his actions, thinking that he went way too far, Antonio recruits the help of Luis and Cinta to ask Carmen to forgive him. Carmen still loves Antonio and they get back together. Though eaten up with jealousy, Antonio goes ahead and marries Carmen, who tries to distract him with passionate sex and promises that she wants only to be a perfect wife and get pregnant. The couple happily settle into their new home. However, once he is back on the road with his truck, Antonio plods ahead with his investigation into José's identity. From then on, he would not stop until he finds who is the man in the photograph and what was his relationship with Carmen. Antonio wants to know the truth that he feels everybody is hiding from him. Some fellow truck drivers have known José, and they lead Antonio to the small town of Montero. Apparently José has died recently in an accident.

At peace knowing that his rival is dead, Antonio gives the news to Carmen, but she tells him that José is still alive. Cinta has received a letter from José. Shortly after, Cinta, who has broken her relationship with her boss to go back with Luis, is nowhere to be found. From a prostitute in bar where José used to work Antonio learns that José is a good-for-nothing who lives by deceiving women. Tired of hiding the truth, Carmen makes a painful confession. She was madly in love with José who took advantage of her even to the point of prostituting her for a time. She was rescued by her family. She had a child fathered by José, but the kid disappeared mysteriously, probably killed by José.

When Antonio finally learns that José is in Oviedo he goes there to find him. Carmen drops everything and joins Antonio in the search. They take a rifle with them. They arrive in the middle of a rain storm. They spot José with Cinta hiding from the rain under an umbrella. When Carmen points at them Antonio aims his rifle at his rival, but ultimately is hesitant to shoot. Carmen, more resolute, takes the rifle from Antonio’s hand and shoots repeatedly at the couple under the umbrella. José and Cinta fall dead while the heavy rain keeps falling.

== Cast ==
- Aitana Sánchez-Gijón as Carmen
- Daniel Giménez Cacho as Antonio
- María Botto as Cinta
- Luis Tosar as Luis
- Alicia Sánchez as Carmen's mother
- Pepo Oliva as Carmen's father
- Carlos Kaniowsky as Féculas
- Andrés Lima as Mirindas
- Trinidad Rugero as Chona
- Joan Gadea as shoe store owner

== Overview ==
This drama film was director Vicente Aranda's third entrance in the love triangle trilogy formed with Amantes and Intruso. The director constructed a story around destructive passions that end tragically. A truck driver is tormented by jealousy about the former boyfriend of the beautiful woman he is about to marry, launching a hunt to find him and know the truth that he feels his fiance is hiding from him.

== DVD release ==
Celos has been released on DVD in North America twice. It was issued on DVD by Vanguard Cinema on August 14, 2001 as Jealousy (the film's title in English). The film was released as Celos by Urban Vision on June 28, 2005. Both editions are in Spanish with English subtitles, as the options offered.

== See also ==
- List of Spanish films of 1999
