= Dani de la Torre =

Spanish film and television director and screenwriter (born 1975)

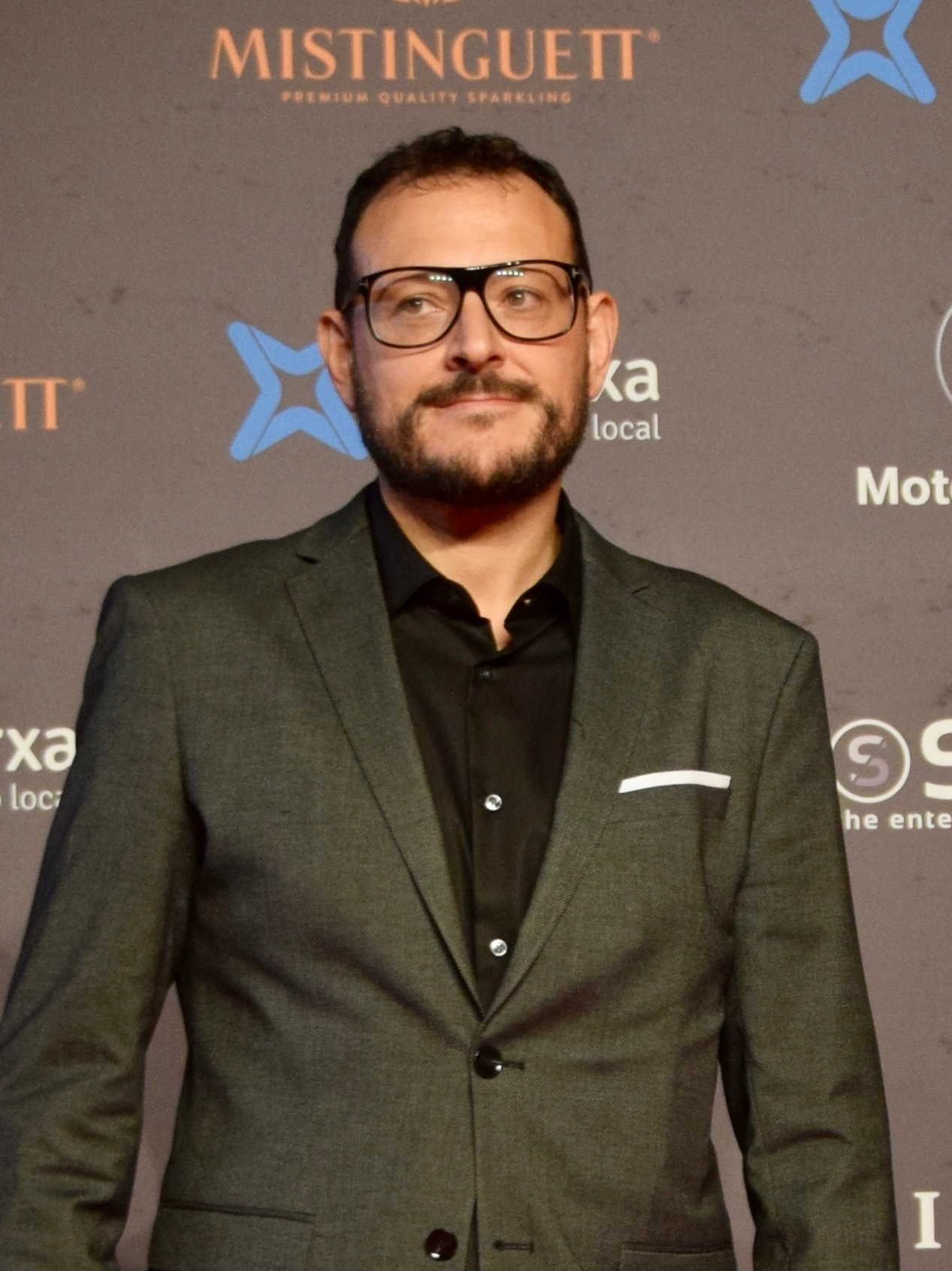
- At the 2018 Sitges Film Festival
- Born: Daniel de la Torre Alvaredo; 4 January 1975 (age 51); Monforte de Lemos, Spain
- Occupations: Film director; television director; screenwriter

Daniel de la Torre Alvaredo (born 4 January 1975) is a Spanish film and television director and screenwriter from Galicia.

== Life and career ==
Daniel de la Torre Alvaredo was born on 4 January 1975 in Monforte de Lemos.

His debut film, action thriller Retribution, world premiered at the 2015 Venice Days, also earning him a nomination for the Goya Award for Best New Director. It was followed by gangster thriller Gun City (2018) and adventure film Live Is Life (2021). He directed the 36th Goya Awards ceremony held in Valencia in February 2022. In addition to his film work, he has co-created with Alberto Marini the thriller television series La unidad and Marbella. In 2024, de la Torre began shooting spy action film Zeta.
