= Andrés Gertrúdix =

Spanish actor (born 1977)

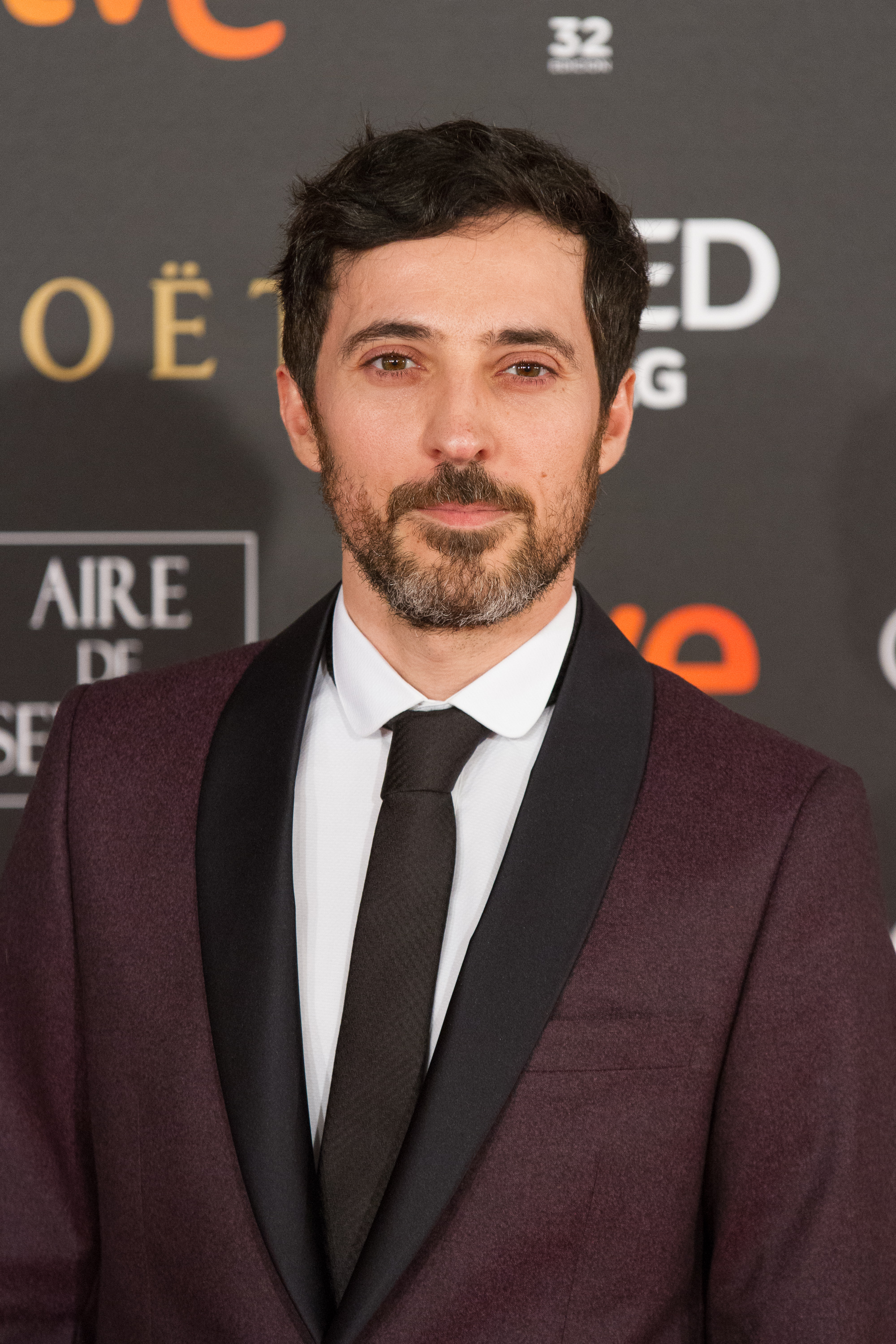
- Attending the 32nd Goya Awards in 2018
- Born: 1977 (age 48–49); Madrid, Spain
- Occupation: Actor
- Partner: Marian Álvarez

Andrés Gertrúdix (born 1977) is a Spanish actor.

== Biography ==
Andrés Gertrúdix was born in 1977 in Madrid. He made his feature film debut in Ray Loriga's My Brother's Gun. He is the partner of actress Marian Álvarez, whom with he has featured in Wounded and Dying.

== Filmography ==
=== Film ===
Year	Title	Role	Notes	Ref.
1997	La pistola de mi hermano (My Brother's Gun)	Brother		
1999	Shacky Carmine	Rodol		
2000	Aunque tú no lo sepas (What You Never Knew)	Young Juan	Older version of the character is portrayed by Gary Piquer	
2003	Cámara oscura (Deadly Cargo)	Edgar		
2006	Los aires difíciles (Rough Winds)	Alfonso		
2006	Amor en defensa propia (Love in Self Defense)	Damián		
2006	The Backwoods	Antonio		
2007	Tuya siempre (Always Yours)	César		
2007	El orfanato (The Orphanage)	Enrique		
2010	El idioma imposible (The Impossible Language)	Fernando		
2012	Silencio en la nieve (Frozen Silence)	Guerrita		
2013	Libertador (The Liberator)	Príncipe Fernando		
2013	10.000 noches en ninguna parte (10,000 Nights Nowhere)	The Son		
2013	El árbol magnético (The Magnetic Tree)	Bruno		
2013	La herida (Wounded)	Álex		
2014	Purgatorio (Purgatory)	Carlos		
2014	Las altas presiones	Miguel		
2015	Que Dios nos perdone (May God Save Us)	Padre Raúl		
2017	Morir (Dying)	Luis		
2017	Oro (Gold)	Licenciado Ulzama		
2021	Bajocero (Below Zero)	Golum		
2024	American Star	Cowboy		
2024	Invasión	Julio		
2024	El bus de la vida (The Bus of Life)	Víctor		
2025	La terra negra (The Black Land)	Ángel		

=== Television ===
Year	Title	Role	Notes	Ref.
2016	El ministerio del tiempo	Francisco Morán	Introduced in season 2	
2020	Madres. Amor y vida	Padre Román		
2023	La red púrpura (The Purple Network)	Casto		
2026	Salvador	Abogado Dorado		

== Accolades ==
Year	Award	Category	Work	Result	Ref.
2014	23rd Actors and Actresses Union Awards	Best Film Actor in a Leading Role	10,000 Nights Nowhere	Nominated	
2018	23rd Forqué Awards	Best Actor	Dying	Nominated	
2018	5th Feroz Awards	Best Actor (film)	Dying	Nominated	
2018	73rd CEC Awards	Best Actor	Dying	Nominated	
2018	32nd Goya Awards	Best Actor	Dying	Nominated	
2024	32nd Actors and Actresses Union Awards	Best Television Actor in a Secondary Role	The Purple Network	Nominated	
