= Javier Artiñano =

- Born: 1942; Montes de Oca, San José, Costa Rica
- Died: July 4, 2013; Madrid, Spain
- Occupation: Costume designer

Javier Artiñano (1942 – 4 July 2013) was a Spanish costume designer.

== Selected filmography ==
Film
Year	Title	Notes
2001	Mad Love	Goya Award for best costume design
2001	Lázaro de Tormes	Goya Award for best costume design
1996	Libertarias	
1992	The Fencing Master	Goya Award for best costume design
1991	The Dumbfounded King	Goya Award for best costume design
1989	Esquilache	Goya Award for best art direction
1987	El bosque animado	Goya Award for best costume design
1984	Bicycles Are for the Summer	
1978	La escopeta nacional	
