= Aizpea Goenaga =

Basque writer

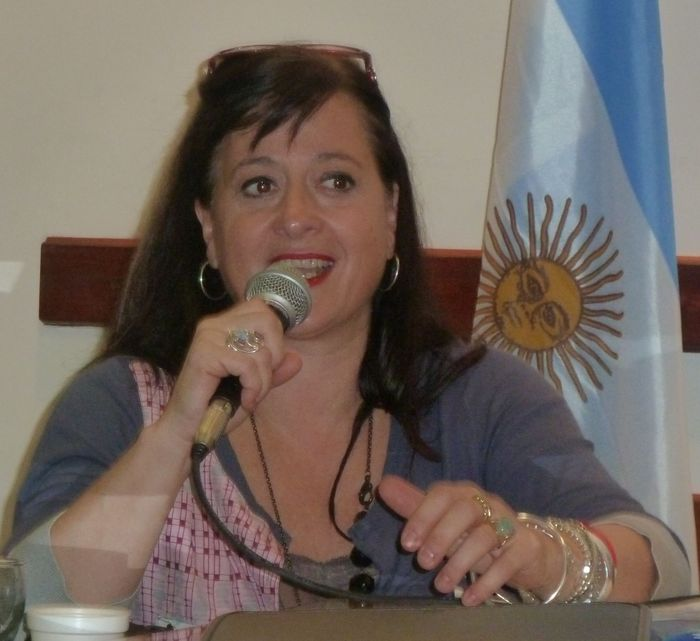
- Goenaga in 2010
- Born: Aitzpea Goenaga Mendiola; 26 November 1959 (age 66); San Sebastián, Guipúzcoa, Basque Country, Spain
- Years active: 1989 - present
- Children: Aia Kruse
- Mother: Juani Mendiola Barkaiztegi
- Website: www.etxepareinstitutua.net/es/

Aizpea Goenaga Mendiola (San Sebastián, Guipúzcoa, Basque Country, 26 November 1959) is a Basque actress and film director. She was the director of Etxepare Basque Institute, the institute of the Basque language and culture between 2009 and 2016. She belongs to a well-known dynasty of Basque actors, Aizpea is the aunt of Bárbara Goenaga, an actress herself, the daughter of the actress Juani Mendiola Barkaiztegi and the sister of the artist Juan Luis Goenaga.

== Filmography ==
=== As a film actress ===
- Obaba (2005)
- Semen, una historia de amor (2005)
- Yoyes (2000)
- Carretera y manta (2000)
- Sí, quiero... (1999)
- Pecata minuta (1999)
- El ataque del hombre mochila (1997)
- Cuestión de suerte (1996)
- Adiós Toby, adiós (1995)
- La gente de la Universal (1991)
- El invierno en Lisboa (1991)
- Santa Cruz, el cura guerrillero (1991)
- Ander eta Yul (1989)

=== As a television actress ===
- Bi eta bat (2012)
- Hospital Central (2004)
- El comisario (2000)
- Teilatupean (2000)
- Goenkale (2000)
- Hermanas (1998)
- Periodistas
- Jaun ta jabe
- Nire familia eta beste animalia batzuk
- Duplex (1993)
- Bi eta bat
- Beni eta Marini
- Hau da A.U.
- Bai Horixe

=== As a director ===
- Sukalde kontuak (2009)
- Zeru Horiek (2006)
- Duplex (1993)

== Awards ==
- In 2011 she received the Simone de Beauvoir Prize from the Exhibition of Film Created by Women.
