= Ginés García Millán =

Spanish film, television, and theater actor

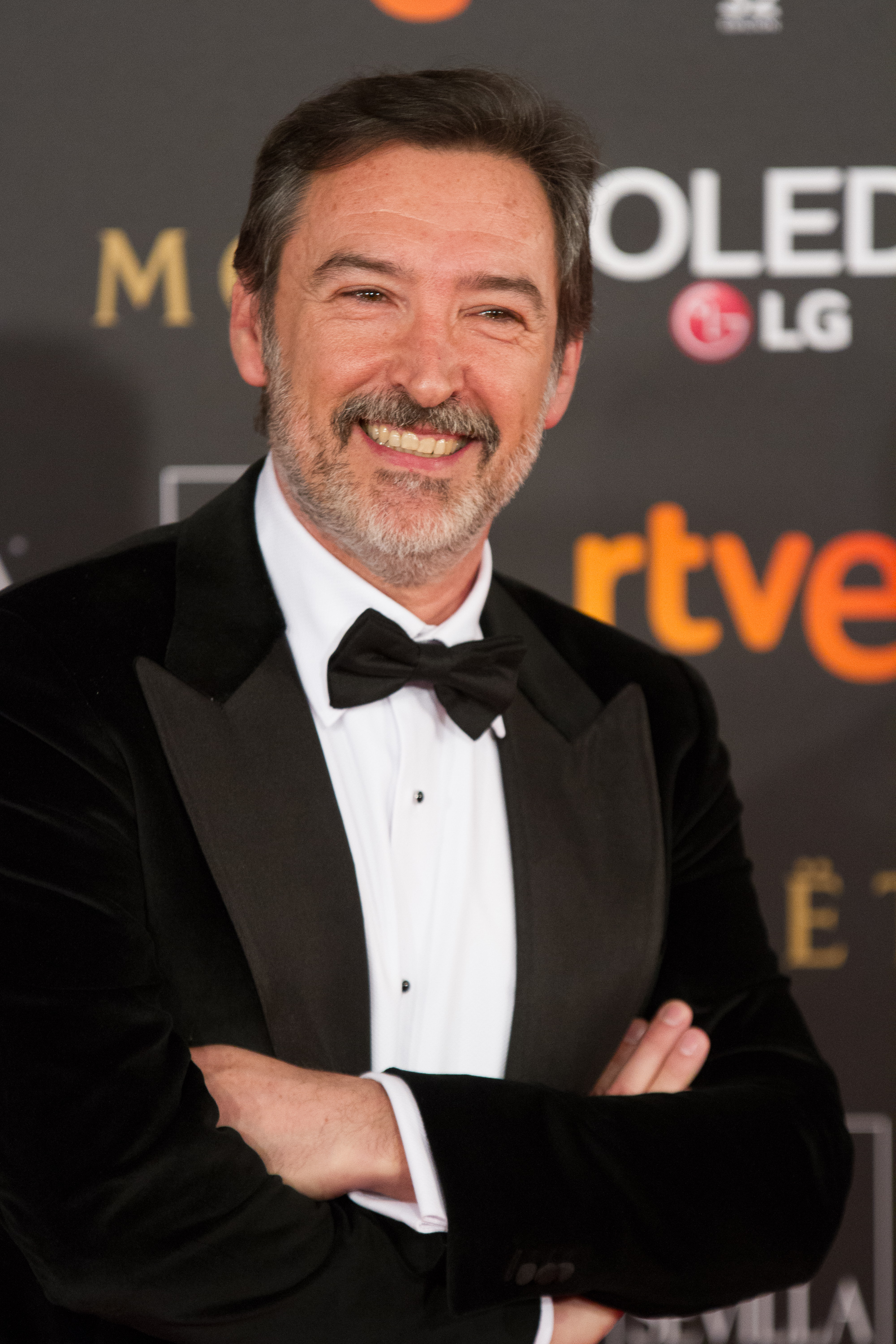
- Garcia Millán at the 32nd Goya Awards in 2018
- Born: 10 September 1964 (age 61); Puerto Lumbreras, Spain
- Occupation: Actor

Ginés García Millán (born 10 September 1964) is a Spanish actor who has combined theater, film and television.

== Biography ==
Born on 10 September 1964 in Puerto Lumbreras, Murcia. His parents operated a hotel in the town. He was a footballer in his youth (playing in the Real Valladolid youth system). He learned his acting chops by training at the RESAD in Madrid.

== Filmography ==
Television

Year	Title	Role	Notes	Ref
1995	Médico de familia			
1996–1998	Todos los hombres sois iguales			
2001–2002	Periodistas			
2003	Un lugar en el mundo			
2005	Motivos personales			
2006–2007	Matrimonio con hijos			
2007–2008	Herederos			
2009–2010	La señora			
2010	Adolfo Suárez, el presidente	Adolfo Suárez	TV movie aired as two-part miniseries	
2010	Alta traición			
2011	Tres días de abril			
2012	Isabel	Juan Pacheco		
2013	Frágiles	Mario	Introduced in season 2	
2014	Cuéntame cómo pasó			
2015	Velvet	Esteban Márquez	Introduced in season 2	
2018	La verdad	Fernando García		
2018	Félix	Mario		
2019	Matadero	Pascual		
2020	El Cid	King Ramiro		
2021	Libertad	Pedro de Urquijo		
2021	¿Quién mató a Sara? (Who Killed Sara?)	César Lazcano	Main cast	

== Theater ==
- Kathie y el hipopótamo by Mario Vargas Llosa (2013-2014)
- Los hijos se han dormido (2012)
- Glengarry Glen Ross (2009)
- Baraka (2006)
- Hamlet (2004)
- Don Juan Tenorio (2000)
- La fundación by Antonio Buero Vallejo (1998)
- El rey Lear (1997-1998)
- Así que pasen cinco años (1989)

== Filmography ==
Year	Film	Director
2013	Cinco de Mayo: La Batalla	Rafa Lara
2006	Hotel Tívoli	Antón Reixa
2005	Pasos	Federico Luppi
2005	Amor en defensa propia	Rafa Russo
2005	100 maneras de acabar con el amor	Vicente Pérez Herrero
2004	Iris	Paz Vergés
2004	Escuela de seducción	Javier Balaguer
2004	El año del diluvio	Jaime Chávarri
2003	Carmen	Vicente Aranda
2002	El regalo de Silvia	Dionisio Pérez Galindo
2002	¡Hasta aquí hemos llegado!	Yolanda García Serrano
2001	Mine Alone	Javier Balaguer
2000	Gitano	Manuel Palacios
1998	Mensaka, páginas de una historia	Salvador García Ruiz
1998	Insomnio	Chus Gutiérrez
1996	Tabarka	Domingo Rodes
1992	El infierno prometido	Juan Manuel Chumilla
