= Aitana Sánchez-Gijón =

Spanish film actress (born 1968)

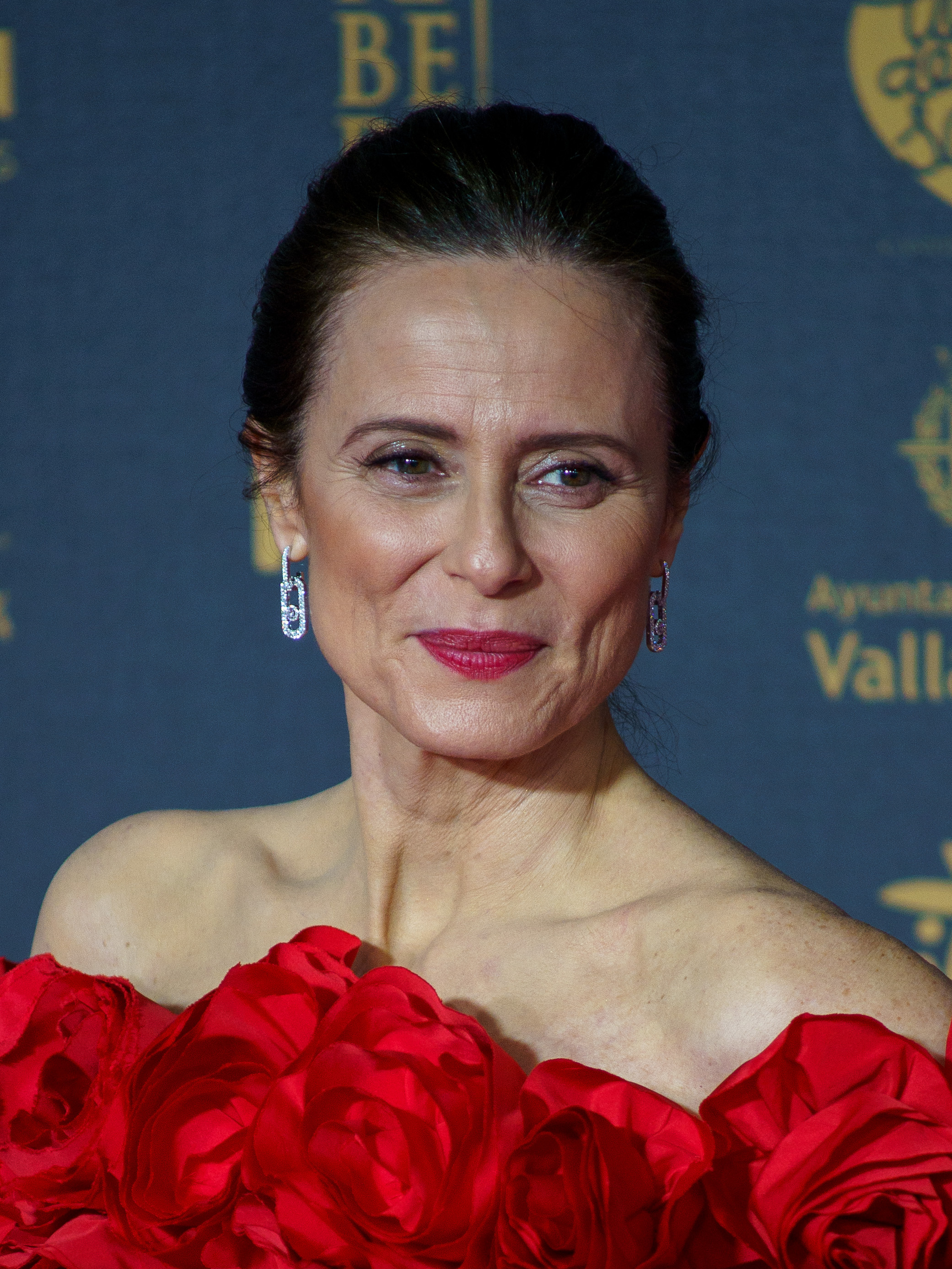
- Sánchez-Gijón in 2024
- Born: 5 November 1968 (age 58); Rome, Italy
- Citizenship: Spain; Italy
- Occupation: Actress
- Years active: 1986–present
- Children: 2
- Relatives: Pablo Carbonell (cousin)

Aitana Sánchez-Gijón de Angelis (born 5 November 1968) is a Spanish and Italian film screen and stage actress. After garnering attention for Going South Shopping (1989), she established her career in the 1990s, featuring in films such as The Bird of Happiness (1993), Mouth to Mouth (1995), The Chambermaid on the Titanic (1997), Jealousy (1999), and Volavérunt (1999).

== Early life and family ==
Aitana Sánchez-Gijón was born in Rome on 5 November 1968, to a Spanish father Ángel Sánchez-Gijón Martínez, a history lecturer exiled from Francoism, and an Italian mother, Fiorella de Angelis, a lecturer. She was named after Aitana Alberti, (Note: In turn named after the Aitana mountain range.) Rafael Alberti's daughter. The latter dedicated Aitana Sánchez-Gijón some verses upon her birth. The family moved to Madrid when she was 1 year old. She is a cousin of Pablo Carbonell.

In 2002, Sánchez-Gijón married Argentine artist Guillermo Papin Luccadane, with whom she had two children. They separated in 2020.

== Career ==
Sánchez-Gijón made her television debut as an actress at age 16 in the high school series Segunda enseñanza, playing Sisi, a lesbian teenager. She landed her film debut in Romanza final (1986). In 1988, she starred as Acacia in The Unloved Woman, a play by Miguel Narros adapting Jacinto Benavente staged at the Teatro Español.

Her breakthrough role as Elena in the 1989 film Going South Shopping launched her career.

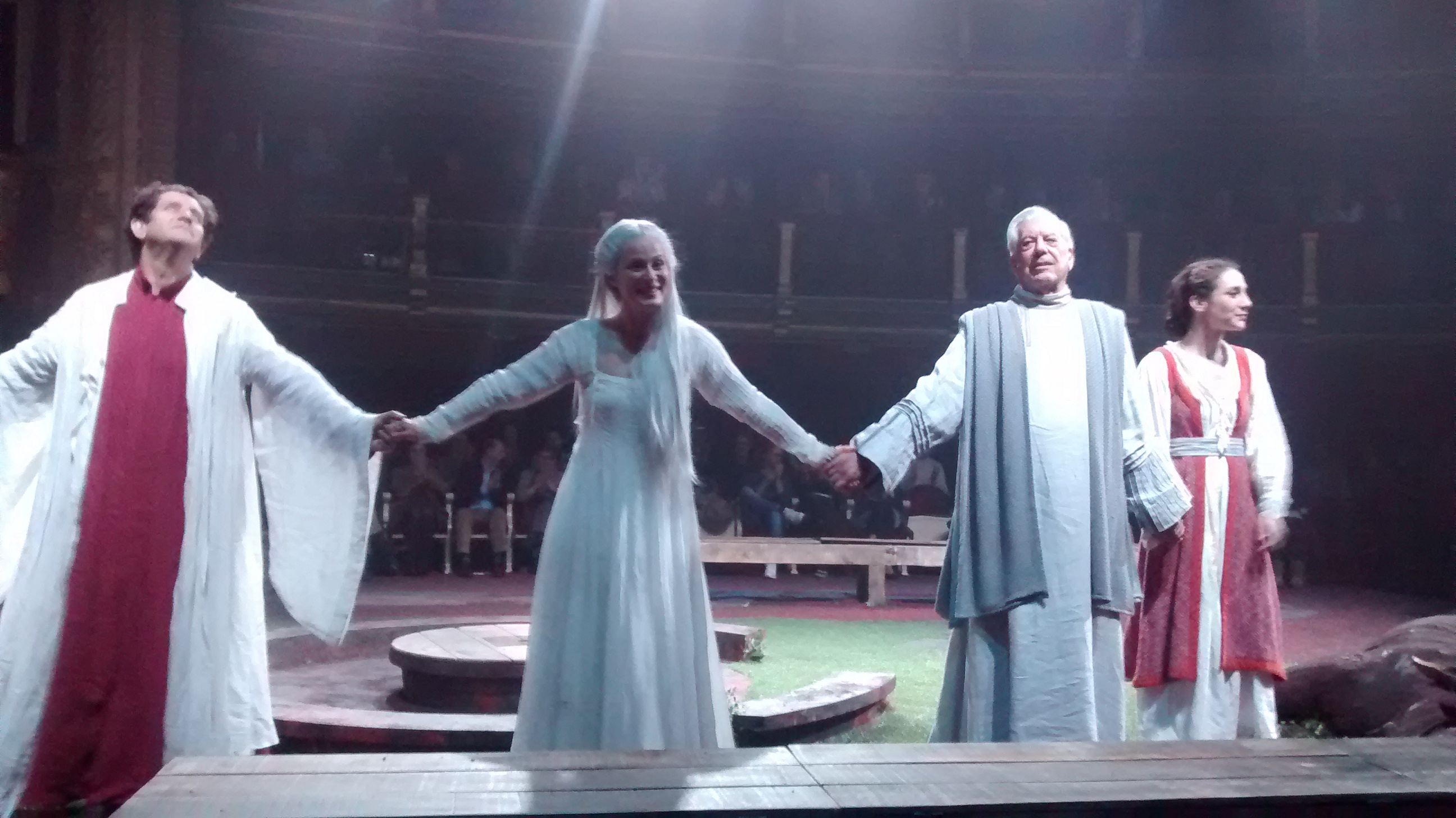
Together with Pedro Casablanc, Mario Vargas Llosa and Marta Poveda in Los cuentos de la peste at the Teatro Español (2015).

Best known for her career in Spanish cinema, Sánchez-Gijón first became known internationally for her portrayal of Victoria Aragon, a pregnant and abandoned Mexican-American winegrower's daughter who is helped by travelling salesman Paul Sutton (Keanu Reeves) in A Walk in the Clouds (1995)

She has since built a reputation as an international star in films such as Manuel Gomez Pereira's Boca a Boca (1996), Bigas Luna's The Chambermaid on the Titanic (1997), Jaime Chávarri's Sus Ojos Se Cerraron (1998), Gabriele Salvatores' adaptation of the Niccolò Ammaniti novel I'm Not Scared (2003) and Brad Anderson's The Machinist (2004).

She served as the president of the Academy of Cinematographic Arts and Sciences of Spain between 1998 and 2000. Her portrayal of the Duchess of Alba in Volavérunt won her the Silver Shell for Best Actress at the 1999 San Sebastián International Film Festival. She was a member of the official jury of the 2000 Cannes Film Festival. (Note: In internal discussions, she reportedly lobbied together with Jeremy Irons and two other fellow jury members in favour of Dancer in the Dark against In the Mood for Love, because according to her, the latter, despite its visual beauty, looked too much like an extended music video.)

She earned her first Goya Award nomination for a supporting role in Parallel Mothers (2021).

In 2023, she featured in Something Is About to Happen playing a theatre producer stealing the story of a taxi driver's life.

In 2024, she appeared in the hospital-set drama Breathless for Netflix. In December 2024, she was awarded the Gold Medal of Merit in the Fine Arts.

In March 2026, she starred again in an adaptation of The Unloved Woman at the Teatro Español, this time directed by Natalia Menéndez. In the play, she portrayed Raimunda, the mother of Acacia.

== Views ==
In 2026, Sánchez-Gijón co-signed alongside other Spanish artists a text urging the United Nations and the governments of the world to actively work towards the release from prison of Palestinian leader Marwan Barghouti.

== Filmography ==
=== Film ===
Year	Title	Role	Notes	Ref.
1986	Romanza final (Gayarre)	Alicia joven	Elder version of the character played by Sydne Rome	
1988	Jarrapellejos	Isabel		
1988	Remando al viento (Rowing with the Wind)	Teresa Guiccioli		
1988	Viento de cólera	María		
1989	Bajarse al moro (Going South Shopping)	Elena		
1989	El mar y el tiempo (The Sea and Time)	Mer		
1990	The Monk	Sor Inés		
1993	Havanera 1820	Amèlia Roig		
1993	El laberinto griego (The Greek Labyrinth)	Bernadette		
1993	El pájaro de la felicidad (The Bird of Happiness)	Nani		
1995	La ley de la frontera (The Law of the Frontier)	Bárbara		
1995	Boca a boca (Mouth to Mouth)	Amanda		
1995	A Walk in the Clouds	Victoria		
1995	La leyenda de Balthasar el castrado	María de Loffredo		
1997	La femme de chambre du Titanic (The Chambermaid on the Titanic)	Marie		
1997	Love Walked In	Vicki		
1998	Sus ojos se cerraron y el mundo sigue andando (Tangos Are for Two)	Juanita		
1998	Yerma	Yerma		
1999	Volavérunt	Duquesa de Alba		
1999	Celos (Jealousy)	Carmen		
2001	Mi dulce (My Sweet)	Ángela		
2001	Hombres felices (Happy Men)	Ana		
2003	Io non ho paura (I'm Not Scared)	Anna		
2004	The Machinist	Marie		
2004	La puta y la ballena (The Whore and the Whale)	Vera		
2006	Animales heridos	Claudia		
2006	The Backwoods	Isabel		
2007	La carta esférica (The Nautical Chart)	Tánger Soto		
2007	Oviedo Express	Mariola Mayo / Ana Ozores (La Regenta)	Ana Ozores is played by Mariola Mayo in-fiction. Sánchez-Gijón already played Ana Ozores in La regenta	
2008	Parlami d'amore (Talk to Me About Love)	Nicole		
2009	The Frost (La escarcha)	Rita		
2011	Gli sfiorati (Drifters)	Virna		
2011	Maktub	Beatriz		
2014	El club de los incomprendidos (The Misfits Club)	Mara		
2018	Thi Mai, rumbo a Vietnam	Elvira		
2020	La cinta de Alex	Vera		
2021	Madres paralelas (Parallel Mothers)	Teresa Ferreras		
2022	La jefa (Under Her Control)	Beatriz		
2023	Que nadie duerma (Something Is About to Happen)	Roberta		
2025	Tierra baja (The Low Land)	Carmen		
2026	Amarga Navidad (Bitter Christmas)	Mónica		

=== Television ===
Year	Title	Role	Notes	Ref
1986	Segunda enseñanza	Sisi		
1992	El Quijote de Miguel de Cervantes	Dorotea		
1995	La regenta	Ana Ozores		
2015	Teresa	Doña Jimena	TV movie	
2017	Conquistadores: Adventvm	Isabel de Castilla	Documentary series	
2017–19	Velvet Colección	Doña Blanca	Recurring role. Seasons 1–3	
2024	Breathless	Pilar Amaro	Main role	

== Accolades ==
Year	Award	Category	Work	Result	Ref.
1996	5th Actors and Actresses Union Awards	Best Leading Performance (TV)	La regenta	Won	
1996	46th Fotogramas de Plata	Best TV Actress	La regenta	Won	
1997	47th Fotogramas de Plata	Best Stage Actress	La gata sobre el tejado de zinc caliente	Won	
1999	47th San Sebastián International Film Festival	Silver Shell for Best Actress	Volavérunt	Won	
2016	66th Fotogramas de Plata	Best Stage Actress	Medea	Won	
2017	67th Fotogramas de Plata	Best Stage Actress	The Rose Tattoo	Won	
2017	26th Actors and Actresses Union Awards	Best Theatre Actress in a Leading Role	The Rose Tattoo	Nominated	
2021	71st Fotogramas de Plata	Best Stage Actress	Juana	Nominated	
2022	9th Feroz Awards	Best Supporting Actress (film)	Parallel Mothers	Won	
2022	36th Goya Awards	Best Supporting Actress	Parallel Mothers	Nominated	
2022	9th Platino Awards	Best Supporting Actress	Parallel Mothers	Won	
2024	11th Feroz Awards	Best Supporting Actress in a Film	Something Is About to Happen	Nominated	
2024	32nd Actors and Actresses Union Awards	Best Film Actress in a Secondary Role	Something Is About to Happen	Nominated	
2025	33rd Actors and Actresses Union Awards	Best Stage Actress in a Leading Role	La madre	Won	

Academic offices
Preceded by José Luis Borau	President of the Academy of Cinematographic Arts and Sciences of Spain; 1998–2000	Succeeded by Marisa Paredes
