= Beloved/Friend =

Amic/Amat
- Directed by: Ventura Pons
- Written by: Ventura Pons; Josep Maria Benet i Jornet
- Produced by: Ventura Pons, Xavier Basté
- Starring: Josep María Pou; Rosa Maria Sardà; Mario Gas; David Selvas; Irene Montalà
- Production company: Els Films de la Rambla, S.A.
- Distributed by: Lauren Films
- Release date: 29 January 1999 (Spain)
- Running time: 90 minutes
- Country: Spain
- Language: Catalan

Beloved/Friend (Catalan: Amic/Amat) is a 1999 film directed by Ventura Pons based on a book by Josep Maria Benet i Jornet, Testament.

== Synopsis ==
A dying, homosexual Middle Ages literature teacher is deciding who should inherit his loved possession; a novel "Blanquerna", written by Ramon Llull.
