= Goya in Bordeaux =

1999 Spanish film

Goya en Burdeos
- Spanish film poster
- Directed by: Carlos Saura
- Written by: Carlos Saura
- Produced by: Andrés Vicente Gómez
- Starring: Francisco Rabal; Maribel Verdú; José Coronado
- Cinematography: Vittorio Storaro
- Edited by: Julia Juaniz
- Music by: Roque Baños
- Release dates: 12 November 1999 (Spain); 15 September 2000 (U.S.)
- Running time: 107 minutes
- Country: Spain
- Language: Spanish

Goya en Burdeos (English: Goya in Bordeaux) is a 1999 Spanish historical drama film written and directed by Carlos Saura about the life of Francisco Goya, the Spanish painter.

== Plot ==
The title refers to Goya's move towards the end of his life to France from where he looks back at his career from the late 18th century onwards. The painter is played by two actors, as a young and an old man. Other characters include the painter's muse, the Duchess of Alba. Some people have assumed that Goya and the Duchess were lovers, and the film follows this interpretation.

== Awards ==
- 5 awards at the 14th Goya Awards including Best Actor (Francisco Rabal)
- 2 Prizes at Montréal World Film Festival
- European Film Awards: Best Cinematographer (Vittorio Storaro)
- Satellite Awards Best Foreign Film nominee

== Cast ==
Incomplete

- Francisco Rabal as Goya
- José Coronado as Goya (young)
- Dafne Fernández as Rosario
- Eulalia Ramón as Leocadia
- Maribel Verdú as María del Pilar Teresa Cayetana de Silva y Álvarez de Toledo, 13th Duchess of Alba
- Joaquín Climent as Moratín
- Cristina Espinosa as Pepita Tudó
- José María Pou as Manuel de Godoy
- Saturnino García as Cura y San Antonio
- Carlos Hipólito as Juan Meléndez Valdés
- Emilio Gutiérrez Caba as José de la Cruz
