= Sonia Grande =

Spanish costume designer

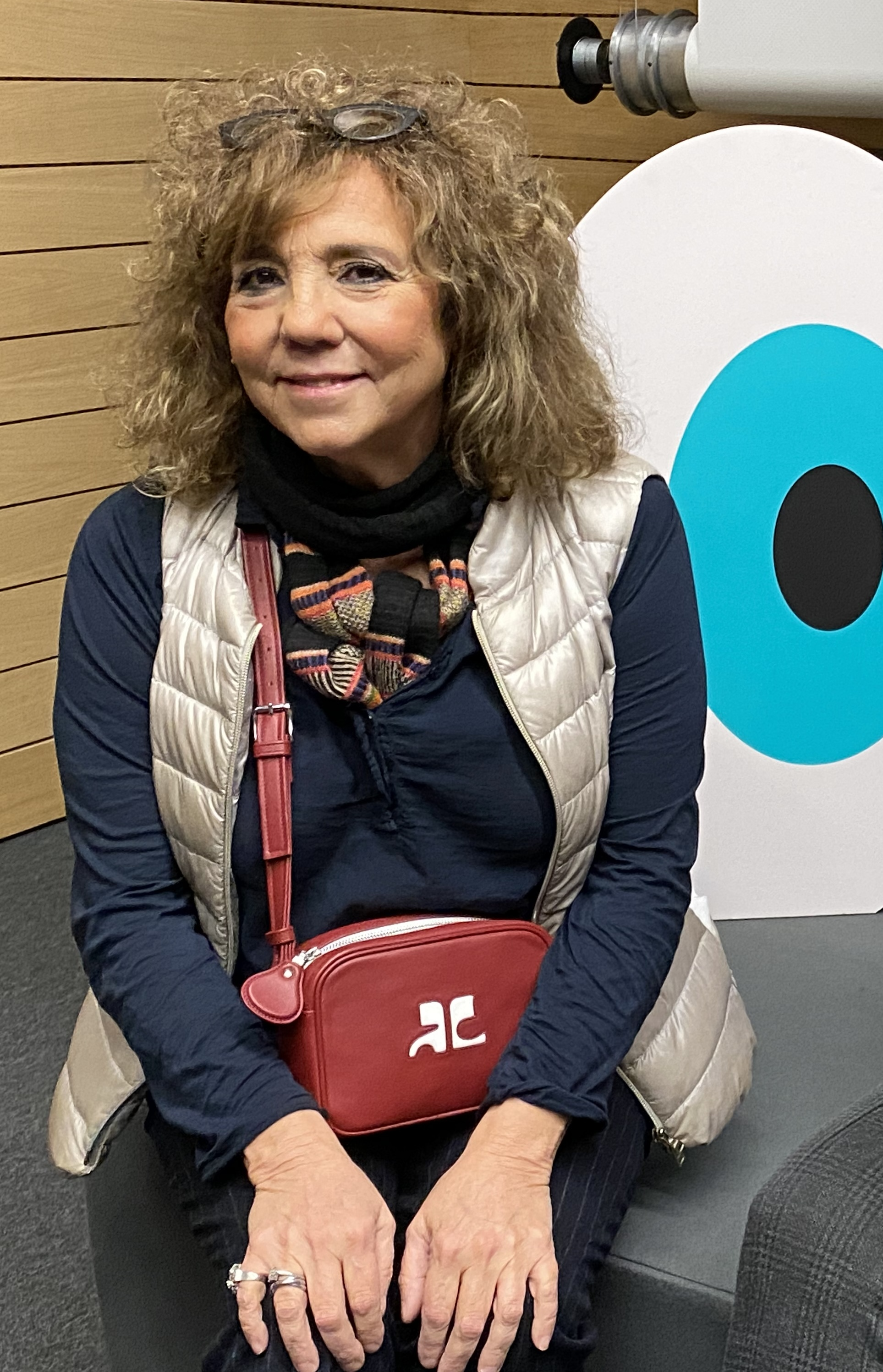

Sonia Grande (born 1964 in Oviedo) is a Spanish costume designer. She is known for her frequent collaborations with film director Woody Allen on such films as Vicky Cristina Barcelona and Midnight in Paris, as well as her work on Fernando Trueba's The Girl of Your Dreams, for which she won Best Costume Design at the 13th Annual Goya Awards.
