= Fernando Cayo =

Spanish actor (born 1968)

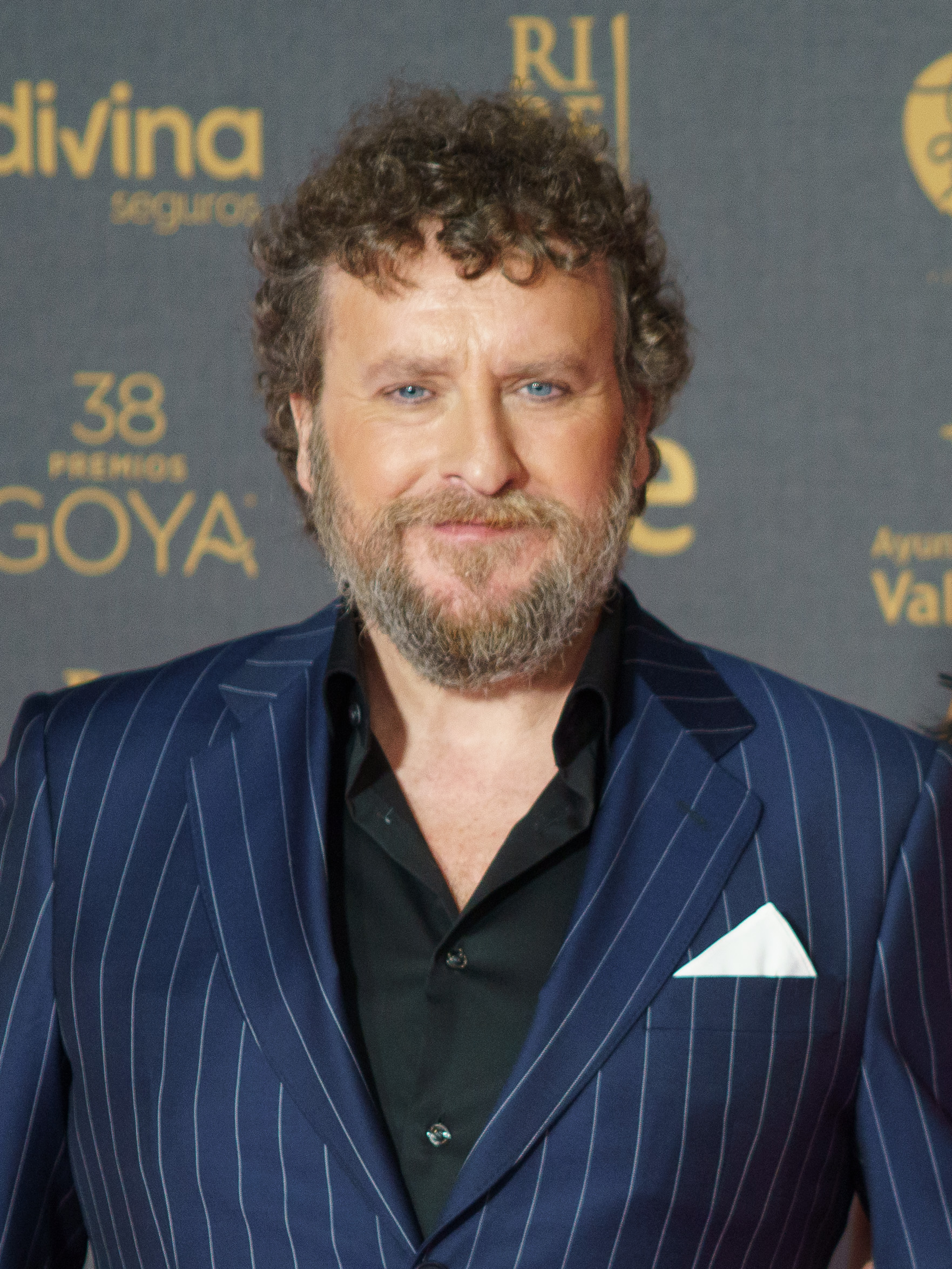
- Cayo in 2024
- Born: Fernando Cayo Jiménez Álvarez; 22 April 1968 (age 57); Valladolid, Spain
- Occupation: Actor

Fernando Cayo Jiménez Álvarez (born 22 April 1968) is a Spanish actor. His television work include performances in Money Heist.

== Biography ==
Fernando Cayo Jiménez Álvarez was born on 22 April 1968 in Valladolid. He moved to Madrid when he was 20 years old and began his acting career. He made his feature film debut as an actor with the leading role of Apolo in Shacky Carmine (1999), for which he won Best Actor at the Toulouse Spanish Film Festival.

== Selected filmography ==
=== Film ===
Year	Title	Role	Notes	Ref.
1999	Shacky Carmine	Apolo		
2005	El penalti más largo del mundo (The Longest Penalty Shot in the World)	Bilbao		
2007	Concursante (The Contestant)	Eloy		
2007	El orfanato (The Orphanage)	Carlos		
2010	Secuestrados (Kidnapped)	Jaime		
2010	Pájaros de papel (Paper Birds)	Capitán Montero		
2011	23-F: la película (17 Hours)	Don Juan Carlos		
2015	El desconocido (Retribution)	Espinosa		
2016	La corona partida (The Broken Crown)	Veyré		
2016	La punta del iceberg (The Tip of the Iceberg)	Carlos Fresno		
2020	Invisibles (The Invisible)	Alberto		
2020	Hasta el cielo (Sky High)	Duque		
2021	Y todos arderán (Everyone Will Burn)	Honorio		
2022	La fortaleza (The Fortress)	Arturo		
2024	El instinto			

=== Television ===
Year	Title	Role	Notes	Ref.
2010	Adolfo Suárez, el presidente	Juan Carlos		
2011	Punta Escarlata	Sargento Reyes		
2011	14 de abril. La República	Ventura		
2012	Toledo, cruce de destinos	Conde de Miranda		
2016	El Caso. Crónica de sucesos	Rodrigo Sánchez		
2017	Amar es para siempre	Ernesto Ortega		
2017	Money Heist	Colonel Luis Tamayo		
2018	McMafia	Guillermo Alegre		

== Awards and nominations ==
Year	Award	Category	Work	Result	Ref.
2016	25th Actors and Actresses Union Awards	Best Film Actor in a Minor Role	Retribution	Nominated	
2016	14th Mestre Mateo Awards	Best Supporting Actor	Retribution	Nominated	
2020	29th Actors and Actresses Union Awards	Best Television Actor in a Minor Role	Money Heist	Won	
2022	30th Actors and Actresses Union Awards	Best Television Actor in a Secondary Role	Money Heist	Won	
