= Volavérunt =

1999 Spanish film

- Theatrical release poster
- Directed by: Bigas Luna
- Starring: Aitana Sánchez-Gijón; Penélope Cruz; Jordi Mollà; Jorge Perugorría
- Release date: 1 October 1999
- Running time: 108 minutes
- Countries: Spain; France
- Language: Spanish

Volavérunt is a 1999 French-Spanish historical drama film directed by Bigas Luna. Based on a novel with the same title by Antonio Larreta, the film is set in Spain at the beginning of the nineteenth century.

The title Volavérunt refers to the Latin word volāvērunt 'they flew'; in the film, however, the word is also used euphemistically as a familiar term for the female genitalia.

== Cast ==
- Aitana Sánchez-Gijón as Duquesa de Alba
- Penélope Cruz as Pepita Tudó / la Maja
- Jordi Mollà as Manuel de Godoy
- Jorge Perugorría as Francisco de Goya
- Stefania Sandrelli as reina María Luisa de Parma
- Carlos La Rosa as rey Carlos IV
- Zoe Berriatúa as príncipe Fernando VII
- Olivier Achard as Grognard
- Jean-Marie Juan as Pignatelli
- Ayanta Barilli as Duquesa de Osuna
- María Alonso as Condesa de Chinchón
