= Maribel Verdú filmography =

Spanish actress

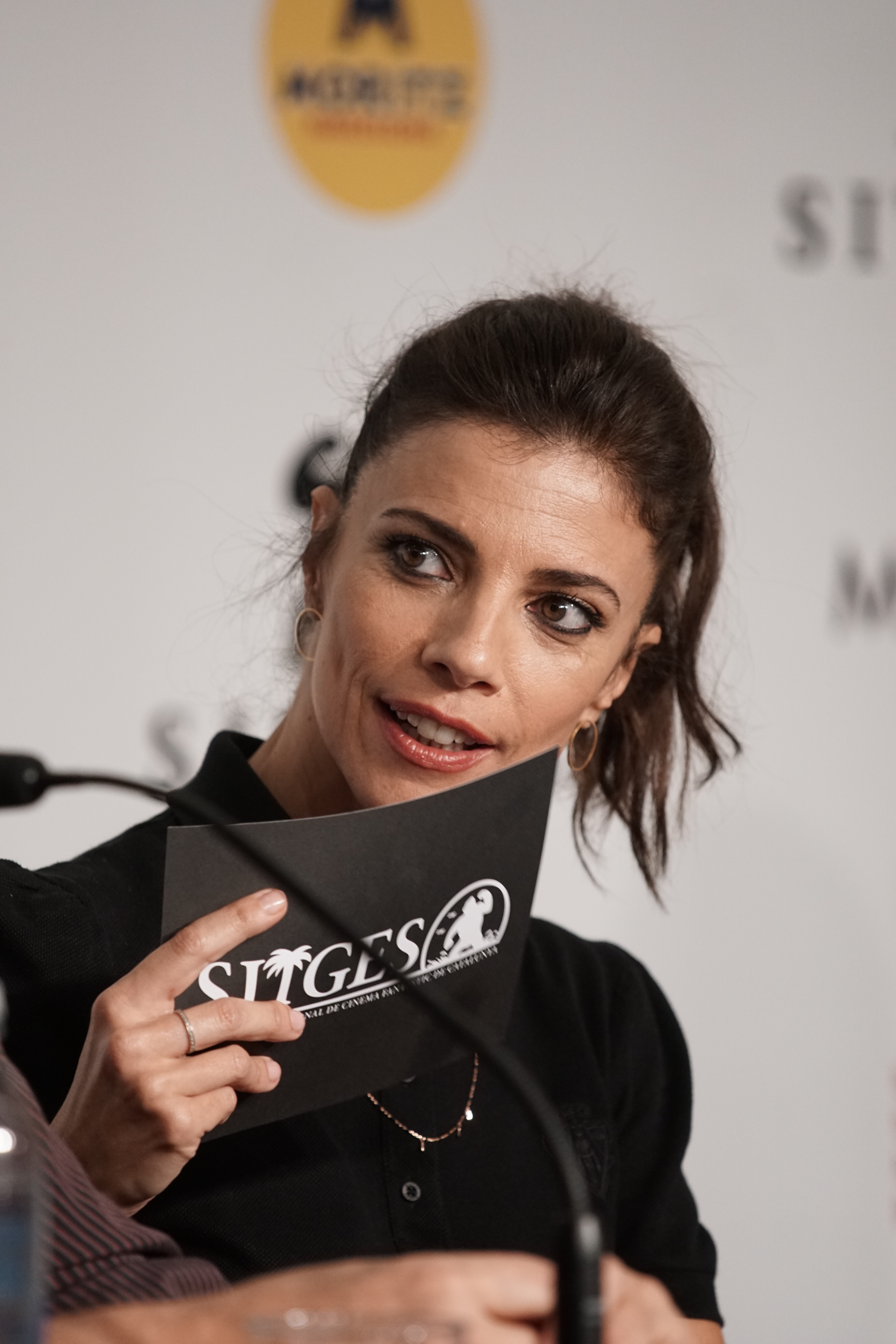
Verdú at the 2019 Sitges Film Festival

Maribel Verdú is a Spanish actress. She began her acting career in her teens, working in television series La huella del crimen at age 13 and in protractedly-postponed film El sueño de Tánger at age 14. She left her studies at age 15 to fully dedicate to acting. Her first appearances in cinema screens came in 1986 with El orden cómico, and quinqui film 27 Hours. She has since developed a prolific film career combined with an intermittent television career.

== Film ==
Key
†	Denotes films that have not yet been released

Year	Title	Role	Notes	Ref.
1986	27 horas (27 Hours)	Maite		
1986	El año de las luces (Year of Enlightment)	María Jesús		
1987	La estanquera de Vallecas (Hostages in the Barrio)	Ángeles		
1988	El juego más divertido (The Most Amusing Game)	Betty		
1988	Barcelona Connection	Paloma		
1988	Sinatra	Natalia		
1988	El aire de un crimen (Scent of a Crime)	La Chiqui		
1988	Soldadito español (The Little Spanish Soldier)	Marta		
1989	Ovejas negras	Lola		
1990	Los días del cometa	Aurora		
1991	El sueño de Tánger	Viernes / Lola		
1991	Amantes (Lovers)	Trini		
1992	Salsa rosa (Pink Sauce)	Koro		
1992	Belle Époque	Rocío		
1992	El beso del sueño	Margot		
1993	Huevos de oro (Golden Balls)	Claudia		
1993	Tres palabras	María Galván / Lupe		
1994	Al otro lado del túnel (On the Far Side of the Tunnel)	Mariana		
1994	Canción de cuna (Cradle Song)	Teresa		
1994	El cianuro... ¿solo o con leche?	Justina		
1996	La Celestina	Areusa		
1997	La buena estrella (The Lucky Star)	Marina		
1997	Carreteras secundarias (Backroads)	Paquita		
1998	Frontera Sur (Southern Border)	Teresa / Piera		
1999	El entusiasmo (Enthusiasm)	Isabel		
1999	Goya en Burdeos (Goya in Bordeaux)	Duquesa de Alba		
2000	El portero (The Goalkeeper)	Manuela		
2000	Dinosaur	Neera	Voice in the European Spanish track	
2001	El palo (The Hold-Up)	Silvia		
2001	Y tu mamá también	Luisa Cortés		
2001	Black Serenade (Tuno negro)	Arantxa González		
2002	Lisístrata	Lisístrata		
2003	Tiempo de tormenta (Stormy Weather)	Elena		
2003	Jericho Mansions	Dolores		
2006	El laberinto del fauno (Pan's Labyrinth)	Mercedes		
2007	El niño de barro (The Mud Boy)	Estela		
2007	La zona (The Zone)	Mariana		
2007	Siete mesas de billar francés (Seven Billiard Tables)	Ángela		
2007	Oviedo Express	Mina		
2008	Gente de mala calidad	Osiris		
2008	Los girasoles ciegos (The Blind Sunflowers)	Elena		
2009	Tetro	Miranda		
2011	De tu ventana a la mía (Chrysalis)	Inés		
2012	Blancanieves (Snow White)	Encarna		
2012	Fin (The End)	Maribel		
2013	15 años y un día (15 Years and One Day)	Margo		
2013	Gente en sitios (People in Places)			
2015	Felices 140	Elia		
2015	Sin hijos (No Kids)	Vicky		
2016	La punta del iceberg (The Tip of the Iceberg)	Sofía Cuevas		
2016	El faro de las orcas (The Lighthouse of the Orcas)	Lola		
2017	Abracadabra	Carmen		
2018	Sin rodeos (Empowered)	Paz		
2018	Ola de crímenes (Crime Wave)	Leyre		
2018	Superlópez	Ágata Müller		
2019	El doble más quince	Ana		
2019	El asesino de los caprichos (The Goya Murders)	Carmen Cobos		
2020	El año de la furia (The Year of Fury)	Emilia		
2022	Raymond & Ray	Lucia		
2022	Historias para no contar (Stories Not to Be Told)	Blanca		
2023	Uno para morir (Death's Roulette)	Marta		
2023	The Flash	Nora Allen		
2023	Pet Shop Days	Karla		
2023	Invitación a un asesinato (A Deadly Invitation)	Olivia Uriarte		
2023	Familia	Clara		
2025	Bajo tus pies (Under Your Feet)	Isabel		
2026	Gracias, equipo (Go Team!)	Pepa		
TBD	La reina †			

== Television ==
Year	Title	Role	Notes	Ref.
1985	La huella del crimen		Episode "El crimen del capitán Sánchez"	
1986	Segunda enseñanza	Laura		
1990	La femme et le pantin	Estrella	TV movie	
1991	Los jinetes del alba (Riders of the Dawn)	Raquel	Television miniseries	
1994	Canguros	Alicia		
1999	Ellas son así	Paula		
2003	Código fuego	Elena Valdés		
2005	Mar Rojo	Julia	TV Movie	
2021	Ana Tramel. El juego (ANA. all in)	Ana Tramel		
2022	Now and Then	Sofía Mendieta		
2023–24	Élite (Elite)	Carmen	Seasons 7–8	
2025	Cuando nadie nos ve (When No One Sees Us)	Lucía Gutiérrez		
2026	La casa de los espíritus (The House of the Spirits)	Tránsito Soto		
