= The Most Amusing Game =

- Spanish: El juego más divertido
- Directed by: Emilio Martínez-Lázaro
- Screenplay by: Emilio Martínez-Lázaro; Luis Ariño
- Produced by: Fernando Trueba; Emilio Martínez-Lázaro
- Starring: Victoria Abril; Antonio Valero; Antonio Resines; Maribel Verdú; Santiago Ramos; Miguel Rellán; Ricard Borràs; Nancho Novo; El Gran Wyoming
- Cinematography: Juan Amorós
- Edited by: Nieves Martín
- Music by: Ángel Muñoz-Alonso
- Production companies: Kaplan; TVE
- Distributed by: Iberoamericana Distribución
- Release date: 22 January 1988
- Country: Spain
- Language: Spanish

The Most Amusing Game (Spanish: El juego más divertido) is a 1988 Spanish screwball comedy film directed by Emilio Martínez-Lázaro and co-written with Luis Ariño. It stars Victoria Abril, Antonio Valero, Antonio Resines, Maribel Verdú, and Santiago Ramos.

== Plot ==
Ada and Bruno, the co-stars of the popular television series Hotel de Fez develop an adulterous affair, but they are so popular that, unlike in the series, they do not get the chance to have sex in real life.

== Cast ==
- Victoria Abril as Ada Lasa / Sara
- Antonio Valero as Bruno Laforque
- Antonio Resines as Tomás
- Maribel Verdú as Betty
- Santiago Ramos as Dionisio
- Miguel Rellán as Longinos Vázquez
- Ricard Borràs as José Retama
- El Gran Wyoming as Ricardo Almonte
- Nancho Novo as Robert Moreno
- Diana Peñalver
- Manolo Zarzo
- Manuel de Blas

== Production ==
The film boasted a budget of around 147 million ₧. Shooting locations in Madrid included AZCA.

== Release ==
The film was released theatrically in Spain on 22 January 1988. It had 254,906 admissions.

== Reception ==
Octavi Martí of El País considered that "on paper, the film is splendid; in practice, not so much", resenting Valero's lack of comedy chops.

== See also ==
- List of Spanish films of 1988
