= Lulu by Night =

1985 film by Emilio Martínez Lázaro

Lulú de noche
- Directed by: Emilio Martínez-Lázaro
- Written by: Emilio Martínez-Lázaro
- Produced by: Emilio Martínez-Lázaro; Fernando Trueba
- Starring: Imanol Arias; Antonio Resines; Amparo Muñoz; Patricia Adriani; Assumpta Serna; Asunción Balaguer; Fernando Vivanco; Pilar Marco; El Gran Wyoming
- Cinematography: Juan Amorós
- Edited by: Nieves Martín
- Music by: Ángel Muñoz-Alonso
- Production companies: Kaplan; Fernando Trueba P.C.; Televisión Española
- Release date: February 20, 1986 (Spain)

Lulu by Night (Spanish: Lulú de noche) is a 1986 Spanish comedy-drama thriller film directed, written and produced by Emilio Martínez-Lázaro and starring Imanol Arias, Asunción Balaguer and Antonio Resines. The music is composed by Ángel Muñoz-Alonso. It is based on the stage play Lulu, by Franz Wedekind.

== Cast ==
- Imanol Arias as Rufo
- Amparo Muñoz as Nina
- Antonio Resines as Germán Rios
- Assumpta Serna as Amelia
- Patricia Adriani as Lola
- Asunción Balaguer as Josefina
- Fernando Vivanco as César Valle
- Pilar Marco
- El Gran Wyoming as Paco
- Chus Lampreave as Farmacéutica #2
- Bárbara Tardón
- Yelena Samarina as Actriz
- Luis Hostalot
- Ricardo Palacios as Propietario Jazz Bar
- Estanis González as Policía
- Margarita Calahorra as Farmacéutica #1
- Fernando Sotuela as Sacerdote
- Mercedes Camins
- Concha Gómez Conde as Vecina (as Concha Gómez-Conde)
- Ángel Muñoz Alonso as Ángel (as El Maestro Reverendo)
- Jesús Fernández as Juanín
- Fernando Salas
- Antonio Chamorro as Recepcionista hotel
- Mapi Galán as herself (as Mappi Galán)
- José Luis Baringo
- Florindo Tomás
- Emilio Fuentes
- José Ramón Pardo as Policía
- Santos Salazar
- Julio Pérez Perucha (as Julio Pérez Perrucha)
- Francisco Llinás as Quintanilla (as Francisco Llinas)
- Laura Bayonas as Laura
- Ángeles Caso as herself
- Rosa María Mateo as herself
- Pope John Paul II as himself
