= Gerardo Olivares =

Spanish filmmaker and screenwriter (born 1964)

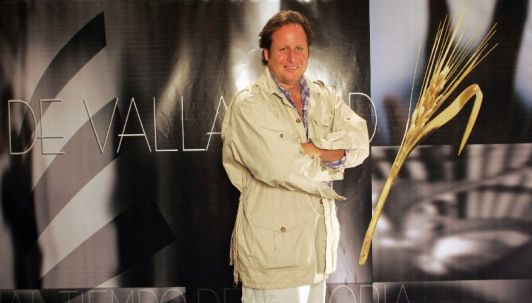
- Olivares in November 2007, winner of the Seminci prize for 14 kilómetros
- Born: 1964 (age 61–62); Córdoba, Andalusia, Spain
- Occupations: Filmmaker; screenwriter
- Known for: La Gran final
- Children: 2

Gerardo Olivares (born 1964) is a Spanish filmmaker and screenwriter. He is married with two children and lives in Madrid. He was the first Spanish man to win the Golden Spike at the prestigious Seminci film festival in Valladolid for his film "14 kilómetros". He received the 2019 Cinema for Peace Award for Justice for his film 'Two Catalonias.'

== Travels ==
A tireless traveler, Olivares began to travel the world in 1987 while studying Information Science at the Complutense University of Madrid. At the age of twenty he borrowed a Vespa motorcycle from his brother and for four months traveled in the North Cape in Lapland, where he did his first reportage on the nomads who live beyond the Arctic Circle. Back in Madrid, the report was published in Los Aventureros (The Adventurer). Months later he started working under the direction of the journalist and writer Enrique Meneses, whom he has always considered his master.

A year later Olivares covered a good part of the Sahara with a Seat Panda, a desert he later crossed on multiple occasions. During this trip he began to mature what would be his first major documentary project, La Ruta de las Córdobas (The Cordobas Route), a trip from Alaska to Tierra del Fuego, following the 36 cities, towns and geographical features with the name of Cordoba. For a year and a half he traveled along the spine of the Americas in three all-terrain vehicles, and the result was a series of 8 episodes issued in 1992 by TVE with great ratings success.

Two years later, in 1994, Olivares encircled the continent of Africa by land, from Morocco to South Africa and then to Egypt, as Director of Ruta de los Exploradores (Path of the Explorers), co-produced by TVE. In 1997 he traveled across the Asian continent from Spain to Singapore in two trucks for the series Road to Samarkand, the most watched program of 2000 in TVE 2, winning the GECA award for a record audience.

== Fiction ==
In 2005, after a long career directing and writing documentaries, Olivares decided to jump into fiction with the help of producer Jose Maria Morales (Wanda Films) with La Gran final (The Great Match), shot in Mongolia, the Sahara and Brazilian Amazon. This film won several international awards and was selected to participate, among others, in the Berlin International Film Festival. The film was an official selection at the Copenhagen International Film Festival, the Galway Film Fleadh, the World Cinema Festival, Cape Town, and the Desert Nights Filmfest, Rome. It was nominated for Best Film at the Malaga Spanish Film Festival.

In 2006 he wrote and directed 14 kilómetros, a film about the plight of African immigration that has won over 15 international awards, affirming him as one of the most committed filmmakers in the panorama of Spanish cinema. His 2010 feature film, Entrelobos (Among wolves), based on the remarkable story of Marcos Rodríguez Pantoja, has been one of the highest grossing Spanish films of 2010 with more than half a million viewers in theaters. It tells the true story of a young shepherd in a remote mountain area who befriends a pack of wolves and eventually becomes their leader.

== Filmography ==
A partial list of films:

Year	Film	Notes
1992	La ruta de las Córdobas (Route of Cordoba)	
1994	La ruta de los exploradores (The Path of the Explorers)	
1997	La ruta de Samarkanda (Road of Samarkand)	
1999	Moradores del Himalaya (Dwellers of the Himalayas)	La Cinquieme & RAI
2000	Herederos de Gengis Kan (Heirs of Genghis Khan)	
2000	Fantasmas de Sulawesi (Ghosts of Sulawesi)	
2000	Los hijos del jaguar (Sons of the Jaguar)	Canal Plus and TVE
2001	El desierto de los esqueletos (The Desert of the Skeletons)	Canal Plus and TVE
2001	Mekong, el río de los nueve dragones (Mekong, The River of the Nine Dragons)	Canal Plus and TVE
2001	Una nube sobre Bhopal (A cloud over Bhopal)	TVE and Tele Piú
2002	Tibet, libertad en el exilio (Tibet, Freedom in Exile)	Canal Plus and TVE
2002	Herederos de la tierra (Heirs of the Earth)	Miniseries
2002	El hambre en el mundo explicada a mi hijo (Hunger in the World Explained to my Son)	
2003	Bajo la sombra de los Annapurnas (Under the Shadow of Annapurna)	
2004	Caravana (Caravan)	Produced by Pedro Almodóvar's El Deseo for TVE
	El tercer planeta (The Third Planet)	Director of filming. National Geographic
	Últimos paraísos (Last Paradises)	Director of filming. Discovery Channel
	Supervivientes del planeta (Planet Survivors)	Director of filming. Canal Plus
2006	La gran final (The Great Match)	
2007	14 kilómetros (14 km)	
2007	Somalia, un mundo aparte (Somalia, a World Apart)	
2007	Cazadores (Hunter)	
2007	Bazares de Oriente (Bazaars of the East)	
2010	Entrelobos (Among Wolves)	500,000 viewers: Sixth highest grossing Spanish film of 2010.
	Aliados del Aire	TVE
2015	Hermanos del viento (Brothers of the Wind)	2nd film in the trilogy Among Wolves/Brothers of the Wind/The Lighthouse of the Whales
2016	El faro de las orcas (The Lighthouse of the Orcas)	3rd film in the trilogy Among Wolves/Brothers of the Wind/The Lighthouse of the Whales
