= Between Your Legs =

1999 film

- Theatrical release poster
- Spanish: Entre las piernas
- Directed by: Manuel Gómez Pereira
- Written by: Joaquín Oristrell; Yolanda García Serrano; Juan Luis Iborra
- Produced by: Manuel Gómez Pereira; Joaquín Oristrell; César Benítez
- Starring: Victoria Abril; Javier Bardem
- Cinematography: Juan Amorós
- Edited by: José Salcedo
- Music by: Bernardo Bonezzi
- Distributed by: Columbia TriStar Films de España
- Release date: 22 January 1999
- Running time: 120 minutes
- Country: Spain
- Language: Spanish

Between Your Legs (Spanish: Entre las piernas) is a 1999 Spanish drama film directed by Manuel Gómez Pereira which stars Victoria Abril, Javier Bardem and Carmelo Gómez. The story involves a Madrid screenwriter, whose life is being ruined by unauthorised circulation of his sexual fantasies on tape, and a police detective's wife who snatches quick moments with strange men. It was entered into the 49th Berlin International Film Festival.

== Plot ==
Javier, a freelance screenwriter, and Miranda, a telephonist at a radio station, meet one evening at a therapy group to combat sex addiction. Javier's wife has left him because he was tricked by a woman called Azucena into recounting his sexual fantasies over a phoneline and cassettes of his imaginary activities are on sale throughout Madrid. Miranda, while walking her dog after her husband has gone to work and her daughter to school, can't resist quick encounters with men.

Immediately attracted to one another, in the car park after the session Javier and Miranda get into the back of an abandoned car. When a corpse is found in the car next morning, the police enquiry is headed by Félix, who is Miranda's husband. He would be delighted to pin the murder onto Javier, who he has seen with Miranda.

After putting all her sleeping pills into Félix's soup, Miranda goes with her luggage and dog to the hotel where Javier is staying. While having sex with her, he has a traumatic flashback. He had gone to the flat of Azucena, who was blackmailing him, and as they had sex he discovered that “she” was a transvestite. Enraged beyond control at this further betrayal, he had killed “her” and put the body in the car. Going straight to the airport, Javier, Miranda and dog board a plane that looks Brazilian. Félix, having bought a puppy to replace the lost pet, meets his daughter off the school bus.

== Cast ==
- Victoria Abril as Miranda
- Javier Bardem as Javier
- Carmelo Gómez as Félix
- Juan Diego as Jareño
- Sergi López as Claudio
- Javier Albalá as Juancar
- María Adánez as Juani
- Carmen Balagué as Begoña
- Manuel Manquiña as Manuel
