= Close to Me (film) =

Italian drama film

- Italian: Muori de lei
- Directed by: Stefano Sardo
- Screenplay by: Stefano Sardo; Giacomo Bendotti
- Story by: Stefano Sardo
- Produced by: Stefano Sardo; Ines Vasiljević
- Starring: Riccardo Scamarcio; Mariela Garriga; Maria Chiara Giannetta; Paolo Pierobon; Giulio Beranek; Francesco Brandi
- Cinematography: Francesco Di Giacomo
- Edited by: Sarah McTeigue
- Production companies: NightSwim; Medusa Film
- Distributed by: Medusa Distribuzione
- Release date: 24 October 2024
- Country: Italy
- Language: Italian

Close to Me (Italian: Muori di lei) is an Italian erotic thriller film directed by Stefano Sardo and starring Mariela Garriga and Riccardo Scamarcio. It was theatrically released in Italy on 24 October 2024, by Medusa Distribuzione.

== Premise ==
A married forty year-old teacher becomes enamoured by his new neighbour.

== Cast ==
- Riccardo Scamarcio as Luca
- Mariela Garriga as Amanda
- Maria Chiara Giannetta as Sara
- Paolo Pierobon
- Giulio Beranek
- Francesco Brandi
- Mariana Falace

== Production ==
The film is co-written by Stefano Sardo and Giacomo Bendotti, from a story by the director, Sardo. It is produced by Ines Vasiljević and Sardo, with NightSwim and Medusa Film. Photography is by Francesco Di Giacomo, with editing by Sarah McTeigue, and set design by Mauro Vanzati with costumes by Cristina La Parola. On 1 May 2024, Variety reported that the English title would be Close to Me, and the Italian title is Muori di lei.

The cast is led by Riccardo Scamarcio, Mariela Garriga and Maria Chiara Giannetta.

Principal photography ended in Rome in April 2024 after six weeks of filming.

== Release ==
The film was theatrically released in Italy by Medusa Distribuzione on 24 October 2024.
