= Bloodline (2018 film) =

- Theatrical release poster
- Directed by: Henry Jacobson
- Written by: Avra Fox-Lerne; Henry Jacobson; Will Honley
- Produced by: Adam Hendricks; John H. Lang; Greg Gilreath; Jason Blum
- Starring: Seann William Scott; Mariela Garriga; Dale Dickey; Kevin Carroll
- Cinematography: Isaac Bauman
- Edited by: Nigel Galt
- Music by: Trevor Gureckis
- Production companies: Blumhouse Productions; Divide/Conquer; Meridian Entertainment
- Distributed by: Momentum Pictures
- Release dates: September 22, 2018 (Fantastic Fest); September 20, 2019 (United States)
- Running time: 95 minutes
- Country: United States
- Language: English

Bloodline is a 2018 American psychological slasher film directed by Henry Jacobson and written by Avra Fox-Lerne, Will Honley and Jacobson. It stars Seann William Scott, Mariela Garriga, Dale Dickey, and Kevin Carroll, and follows Evan Cole (Scott), a high school guidance counselor who becomes a serial killer, targeting child abusers. The film is a co-production between Divide/Conquer and Blumhouse Productions.

Bloodline premiered at Fantastic Fest on September 22, 2018, and was released on September 20, 2019, by Momentum Pictures, receiving mixed reviews from critics.

== Plot ==
A nurse finishing her shift goes to the staff changing room to take a shower. While in the shower, she is killed by an unseen person.

Three months earlier, social worker Evan works with abused and troubled teens. Evan's wife Lauren gives birth to a son, whom they named Andrew. Evan's mother Marie visits the hospital as Lauren is having trouble breastfeeding her baby. The nurse is rude when Marie asks her to be more gentle with the baby.

Evan has a session with one of his students who was beaten by his father. Later he sees the boy's father thrown out of a bar, and offers give him a ride home. At an abandoned mansion the man is squatting in, Evan ties him to a chair. Ignoring the man's pleas, Evan kills him.

Some time later, Evan is speaking with a female student who makes it apparent that she was raped by her uncle. That night, Evan abducts the uncle, takes him to the abandoned mansion and kills him.

Evan gets a call from Chris, another student. Chris's drug-addicted father has returned home and hit him after an argument. The following night, Evan visits the hospital. The rude nurse tells a junkie looking for pain meds to leave and then ends her shift. The nurse is then murdered. At the same time, Evan is revealed to be in another area of the hospital, and offers the junkie some free drugs. It is revealed that the junkie is Chris's father, and the nurse was murdered by Marie.

Evan takes Chris's father to the abandoned mansion and kills him. The following morning, a news broadcast reveals that the bodies Evan buried were found.

A flashbacks shows Evan's father attacking him and his mother. A teenaged Evan killed his father in the same way he would do to his future victims. Marie covered up the murder, buried his father in the garden, and promised to always protect him.

A detective arrives at Evan's home. He suspects Evan's involvement, as all the victims have a connection to him. Lauren also becomes suspicious. That night, Chris shows up at Evan's house and confronts him with a gun about the killing of his father. Evan defuses the situation and sends the boy home without the gun.

Lauren, now almost convinced of Evan's involvement, searches his garage and finds some of the audio recordings Evan made while killing his victims. Lauren phones someone and tells them she would like to meet them. Marie points out to Evan that Lauren is behaving suspiciously, and Evan follows her.

Lauren arrives at a remote location, and it is revealed that she is meeting with Chris. Lauren tells Chris she found proof that Evan killed his father. She then forces a gun into Chris's hand and forces him to shoot himself in the head. Evan smiles as he realizes Lauren does it to protect him, just like his mother. Lauren picks up Chris's phone and begins typing.

The detective shows up at Evan's house to announce the case's closure. A social media post made from Chris's phone took credit for all the murders, claiming he went after the abusers and then killed himself after killing his father. Evan tells the detective he often let Chris be alone in his office and that was likely how he knew about the other abused kids. The detective leaves as the family stand looking at their sleeping child.

== Cast ==
- Seann William Scott as Evan Cole
  - Hudson West as Young Evan
- Mariela Garriga as Lauren Cole, Evan's wife
- Dale Dickey as Marie Cole, Evan's mother
  - Cassandra Ballard as Young Marie
- Kevin Carroll as Overstreet
- Matthew Bellows as Charles Henry Cole III

== Production ==
Principal photography on the film began in January 2018.

== Release ==
Bloodline had its world premiere at Fantastic Fest on September 22, 2018. The film was theatrically released on September 20, 2019, by Momentum Pictures.

Lakeshore Records released the Original Motion Picture Soundtrack of Bloodline, composed by Trevor Gureckis, on September 20, 2019.

=== Reception ===
On Rotten Tomatoes, the film has an approval rating of 50% based on reviews from 20 critics, with an average rating of 5.6/10. On Metacritic, the film has a weighted average score of 50% based on reviews from 4 critics, indicating "mixed or average" reviews.

Dennis Harvey of Variety magazine wrote: "Well acted (though Garriga doesn't quite make a coherent character out of Lauren, or create believable marital chemistry with Scott), this is a smooth movie that maybe should have been a little less tidy for maximum impact."
