= Riders of the Dawn (1990 film) =

1990 film by Vicente Aranda

- Directed by: Vicente Aranda
- Written by: Vicente Aranda; Joaquin Jorda
- Produced by: José Luis Tafur; RTVE
- Starring: Victoria Abril; Jorge Sanz; Maribel Verdú
- Cinematography: Juan Amorós
- Edited by: Teresa Font
- Music by: José Nieto
- Distributed by: RTVE
- Release date: 1990 (Spain)
- Running time: 250 minutes (five episodes)
- Country: Spain
- Language: Spanish

Riders of the Dawn (Spanish: Los Jinetes del Alba) is a 1990 Spanish film, written and directed by Vicente Aranda, an adaptation of a novel by Jesús Fernández Santos. It stars Victoria Abril and Jorge Sanz.

Made as five-episode television miniseries for Televisión Española, it premiered at the 1990 Cannes Film Festival as two-part feature film. The miniseries was broadcast on La Primera Cadena of Televisión Española in 1991.

== Synopsis ==
The plot follows the life of Marian, a young woman whose greatest ambition is to be the owner of the spa resort, where she works. The action is set in Las Caldas, a small town in Asturias, where the lives of its inhabitants are forever changed by the arrival of the Asturian revolution of 1934 and the Spanish Civil War.

== Cast ==
- Victoria Abril as Marian
- Jorge Sanz as Martín
- Maribel Verdú as Raquel
- Graciela Borges as Dona Amalia
- Fernando Guillén as Don Erasmo
- Gloria Muñoz as Adamina
- Antonio Iranzo as El Santero
- Joan Miralles as Ventura
- Nacho Martínez as Juan (Raquel's father)
- Claudia Gravy as Dona Elvira
- Carlos Tristancho as Quincelibras
- Lola Baldrich as Aida
- Conrado San Martín as the doctor
- Paco Catalá as the priest
