= Victoria Abril =

Spanish actress and singer (born 1959)

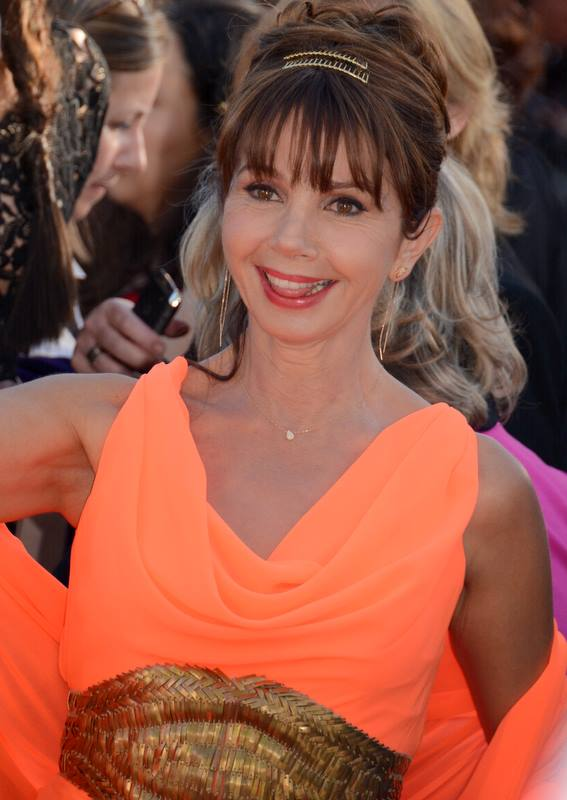
- Abril at the 2013 Cannes Film Festival
- Born: Victoria Mérida Rojas; 4 July 1959 (age 67); Málaga, Spain
- Occupations: Actress and singer
- Years active: 1974–present
- Spouses: Pierre Edelman; Gustavo Laube
- Partner: Gérard de Battista
- Children: 2
- Awards: Silver Bear for Best Actress; 1991 Amantes; Goya Award for Best Actress; 1995 Nobody Will Speak of Us When We're Dead

Victoria Mérida Rojas (born 4 July 1959), better known as Victoria Abril, is a Spanish film actress and singer based in France. She is possibly best known to international audiences for her performance in the film Tie Me Up! Tie Me Down! by director Pedro Almodóvar.

== Life and career ==
Born in Málaga, Abril became widely known in Spain in 1976 when she appeared in the show Un, dos, tres... responda otra vez for two years. In addition to working in Spain, she has made films in France, Italy, and Iceland. She has been nominated eight times for Goya Awards in the Lead Actress category and has won once. She also won the Silver Bear for Best Actress at the 41st Berlin International Film Festival for her role in Amantes. Two years later, she was awarded with the Berlinale Camera at the 43rd Berlin International Film Festival.

Abril is also a singer. In 2005, she made her debut with a bossanova-jazz album called PutchEros do Brasil. She also tried to represent Spain in the Eurovision Song Contest 1979 with "Bang-Bang-Bang", but Betty Missiego was chosen instead.

== Personal life ==
On 28 July 1977, Abril married Gustavo Laube, former footballer of the Chile national football team. The couple separated in early 1982.

Abril has two sons with the French director Gérard de Battista. She lives in France, where she has resided since 1982.

pictures

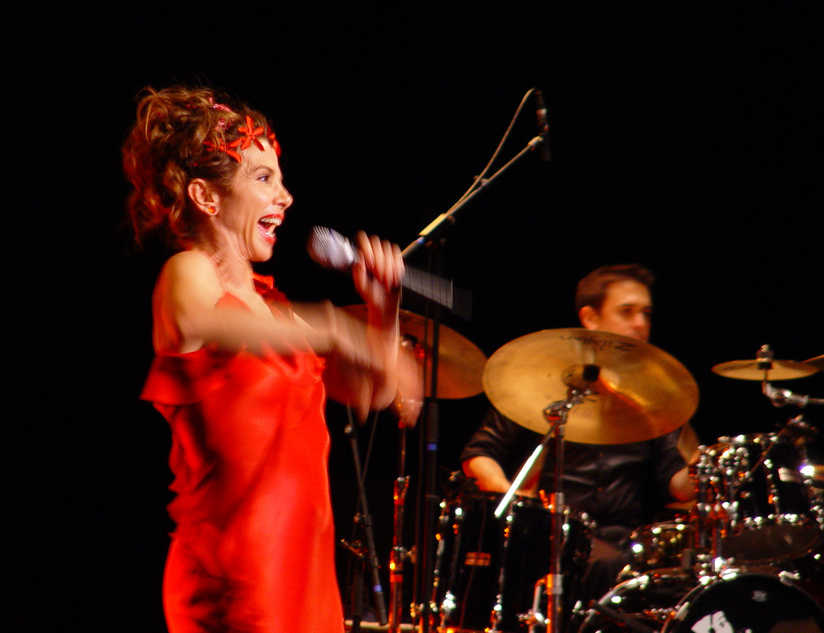
Victoria Abril performing on stage in 2006.

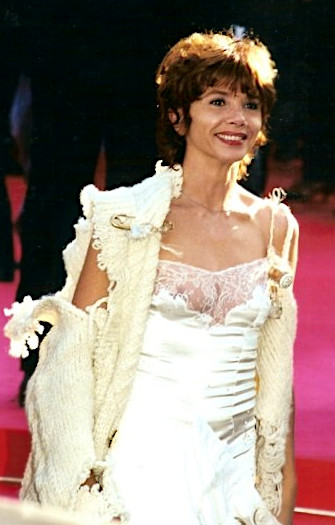
Victoria Abril at the 2000 Cannes Film Festival.

== Filmography ==
| Year | Title | Role | Director | Notes |
|---|---|---|---|---|
| 1974 | Los libros | | Ramón Gómez Redondo | TV series (1 Episode) |
| 1976 | Robin and Marian | Queen Isabella | Richard Lester | |
| 1976 | Storia di arcieri, pugni e occhi neri | Anne Birdsley | Tonino Ricci | |
| 1977 | Change of Sex | José María | Vicente Aranda | |
| 1977 | Foul Play | Lolita | Juan Antonio Bardem | |
| 1977 | Esposa y amante | Marisa | Angelino Fons | |
| 1977 | Doña Perfecta | Rosario | César Fernández Ardavín | |
| 1977 | Caperucita y Roja | Caperucita | Aitor Goirocelaya & Luis Revenga | |
| 1977 | Obsesión | Angelines | Francisco Lara Polop | |
| 1978 | El hombre que supo amar | Amelia | Miguel Picazo | |
| 1979 | La barraca | Roseta | León Klimovsky | TV series (9 Episodes) |
| 1980 | Girl with the Golden Panties | Mariana | Vicente Aranda (2) | |
| 1980 | Mieux vaut être riche et bien portant que fauché et mal foutu | Mercedes | Max Pécas | |
| 1980 | Mater amatísima | Clara | José Antonio Salgot | |
| 1980 | Le cœur à l'envers | The hostess | Franck Apprederis | |
| 1981 | Comin' at Ya! | Abilene | Ferdinando Baldi | |
| 1981 | La batalla del porro | Violeta | Joan Minguell | |
| 1982 | Murder in the Central Committee | Carmela | Vicente Aranda (3) | |
| 1982 | La colmena | Julita | Mario Camus | |
| 1982 | La guérilléra | Bárbara Périsson | Pierre Kast | |
| 1982 | La casa del paraíso | Victoria | Santiago San Miguel | |
| 1982 | Entre paréntesis | Abilene | Simó Fàbregas & Gustavo Montiel Pagés | |
| 1982 | Estudio 1 | Elena | Miguel Lluch | TV series (1 Episode) |
| 1983 | Moon in the Gutter | Bella | Jean-Jacques Beineix | Nominated – César Award for Best Supporting Actress |
| 1983 | No Trace of Sin | María da Luz / Lucilia | José Fonseca e Costa | |
| 1983 | J'ai épousé une ombre | Fifo | Robin Davis | |
| 1983 | Le bâtard | Betty | Bertrand Van Effenterre | |
| 1984 | Bicycles Are for the Summer | Manolita | Jaime Chávarri | |
| 1984 | La noche más hermosa | Elena | Manuel Gutiérrez Aragón | Sant Jordi Awards – Best Spanish Actress |
| 1984 | On the Line | Engracia | José Luis Borau | |
| 1984 | L'addition | Patty | Denis Amar | Fotogramas de Plata – Best Movie Actress; Nominated – César Award for Best Supporting Actress |
| 1984 | Le voyage | Véronique | Michel Andrieu | |
| 1984 | Sous le signe du poisson | Antoinette | Pierre Zucca | TV movie |
| 1985 | Padre nuestro | Cardenala | Francisco Regueiro | ADIRCAE Award – Best Performer |
| 1985 | The Witching Hour | Saga | Jaime de Armiñán | |
| 1985 | After Darkness | Pascale | Dominique Othenin-Girard & Sergio Guerraz | |
| 1985 | Rouge-gorge | Marguerite | Pierre Zucca (2) | |
| 1985 | Los pazos de Ulloa | Nucha / Manolita | Gonzalo Suárez | TV Mini-Series; Nominated – Fotogramas de Plata – Best TV Performer |
| 1985 | La huella del crimen | María Luisa Noguerol | Vicente Aranda (4) | TV series (1 Episode: "Captain Sánchez's Crime") |
| 1986 | Tiempo de Silencio | Dorita | Vicente Aranda (5) | Nominated – Goya Award for Best Actress; Nominated – Fotogramas de Plata – Best Movie Actress |
| 1986 | Max mon amour | Maria | Nagisa Oshima | |
| 1986 | Nuit d'ivresse | Jugnot's wife | Bernard Nauer | |
| 1987 | El Lute: Run for Your Life | Chelo | Vicente Aranda (6) | San Sebastián International Film Festival – Best Actress; TP de Oro – Best Actress; ADIRCAE Award – Best Performance; Nominated – Goya Award for Best Actress |
| 1987 | Law of Desire | Girl with Juan | Pedro Almodóvar | |
| 1987 | Ternosecco | Brigida | Giancarlo Giannini | |
| 1987 | Uptown | Verónica | José Luis García Berlanga | Fotogramas de Plata – Best Movie Actress |
| 1988 | Without Fear or Blame | Jeanne | Gérard Jugnot | |
| 1988 | El juego más divertido | Ada / Sara | Emilio Martínez-Lázaro | Nominated – Fotogramas de Plata – Best Movie Actress |
| 1988 | Baton Rouge | Ana Alonso | Rafael Monleón | Nominated – Goya Award for Best Actress |
| 1988 | El placer de matar | The Merche | Félix Rotaeta | |
| 1988 | Ada dans la jungle | Carmen | Gérard Zingg | |
| 1989 | If They Tell You I Fell | Ramona | Vicente Aranda (7) | Fotogramas de Plata – Best Movie Actress; Cinematografia de la Generalitat de Catalunya – Best Actress; Nominated – Goya Award for Best Actress |
| 1989 | Tie Me Up! Tie Me Down! | Marina Osorio | Pedro Almodóvar (2) | Nominated – Goya Award for Best Actress; Nominated – Fotogramas de Plata – Best Movie Actress |
| 1990 | Sandino | Blanca Arauz | Miguel Littín | Nominated – Fotogramas de Plata – Best Movie Actress |
| 1990 | A solas contigo | Gloria | Eduardo Campoy | |
| 1990 | Riders of the Dawn | Marian | Vicente Aranda (8) | TV Mini-Series; Festival de Programmes Audiovisuels – Golden FIPA; Nominated – TP de Oro – Best Actress |
| 1990 | La mujer de tu vida | Bel | Emilio Martínez-Lázaro (2) | TV series (1 Episode) |
| 1991 | Lovers | Luisa | Vicente Aranda (9) | Berlin Film Festival Award for Best Actress; ADIRCAE Award – Best Actress; Turia Award – Best Actress; Nominated – Goya Award for Best Actress |
| 1991 | High Heels | Rebeca Giner | Pedro Almodóvar (3) | Nominated – Fotogramas de Plata – Best Movie Actress |
| 1991 | Une époque formidable... | Juliette | Gérard Jugnot (2) | |
| 1992 | Demasiado corazón (Too Much Heart) | Ana & Clara Duque | Eduardo Campoy (2) | |
| 1993 | Kika | Andrea Caracortada | Pedro Almodóvar (4) | Association of Latin Entertainment Critics – Best Actress |
| 1993 | Intruder | Luisa | Vicente Aranda (10) | Nominated – Fotogramas de Plata – Best Movie Actress |
| 1994 | Jimmy Hollywood | Lorraine de la Peña | Barry Levinson | |
| 1994 | Casque bleu | Alicia | Gérard Jugnot (3) | |
| 1995 | Nobody Will Speak of Us When; We're Dead | Gloria Duque | Agustín Díaz Yanes | Goya Award for Best Actress; Ondas Award for Best Actress; San Sebastián International Film Festival – Best Actress; Spanish Actors Union – Film : Lead Performance; Nominated – Fotogramas de Plata – Best Movie Actress |
| 1995 | French Twist | Loli | Josiane Balasko | |
| 1996 | Libertarias | Floren | Vicente Aranda (11) | |
| 1997 | La femme du cosmonaute | Anna | Jacques Monnet | |
| 1999 | Between Your Legs | Miranda | Manuel Gómez Pereira | |
| 1999 | Mon père, ma mère, mes frères et mes sœurs | Anne | Charlotte de Turckheim | |
| 2000 | 101 Reykjavík | Lola Milagros | Baltasar Kormákur | Nominated – Edda Award for Best Leading Actor or Actress |
| 2001 | Don't Tempt Me | Lola Nevado | Agustín Díaz Yanes (2) | Nominated – European Film Award for Best European Actress; Nominated – Goya Award for Best Actress; Nominated – Fotogramas de Plata – Best Movie Actress; Nominated – Spanish Actors Union – Film : Lead Performance |
| 2001 | Our Tropical Island | Sabina | Marcello Cesena | |
| 2002 | Et après? | Laura | Mohamed Ismail | |
| 2003 | Kaena: The Prophecy | The Queen | Chris Delaporte & Pascal Pinon | |
| 2004 | The 7th Day | Luciana | Carlos Saura | Nominated – Goya Award for Best Supporting Actress; Spanish Actors Union – Performance in a Minor Role, Female |
| 2004 | Cause toujours ! | Jacinthe | Jeanne Labrune | |
| 2004 | Incautos | Pilar | Miguel Bardem | Fantasporto – Best Actress |
| 2004 | Escuela de seducción | Sandra Vega | Javier Balaguer | |
| 2005 | Les gens honnêtes vivent en France | Aurore Langlois | Bob Decout | |
| 2005 | Carne de neón | Pura | Paco Cabezas | Short |
| 2006 | Tirant lo Blanc | Ines | Vicente Aranda (12) | |
| 2006 | Les Aristos | Pilar de Malaga | Charlotte de Turckheim (2) | |
| 2006 | Summer Rain | The teacher | Antonio Banderas | |
| 2008 | 48 heures par jour | Anna | Catherine Castel | |
| 2008 | Just Walking | Gloria Duque | Agustín Díaz Yanes (3) | |
| 2008 | A Day at the Museum | Clara | Jean-Michel Ribes | |
| 2008 | Leur morale... et la nôtre | Muriel | Florence Quentin | |
| 2008 | Óscar. Una pasión surrealista | Ana | Lucas Fernández | |
| 2008 | Mejor que nunca | Isabel Romero | Dolores Payás | |
| 2009 | X Femmes | Her | Blanca Li | TV series (1 Episode) |
| 2009 | Myster Mocky présente | | Jean-Pierre Mocky | TV series (1 Episode) |
| 2010 | Le grand restaurant | Client | Gérard Pullicino | TV movie |
| 2010– 18 | Clem | Caroline "Caro" Boissier | Joyce Buñuel, Eric Le Roux & Arnauld Mercadier | TV series (season 1 to 8) |
| 2011 | Hospital Central | La Polaca | José Luis García Berlanga (2) | TV series (1 Episode); Spanish Actors Union – Supporting Performance, Female |
| 2011 | La chanson du dimanche | Francesca | Alexandre Castagnetti | TV series (1 Episode) |
| 2011 | Les beaux mecs | Olga | Gilles Bannier | TV series (4 Episodes) |
| 2012 | Mince alors! | Sophie | Charlotte de Turckheim (3) | |
| 2012 | The Woman Who Brushed Off; Her Tears | Helena | Teona Strugar Mitevska | |
| 2014–15 | Sin identidad | Fernanda Duque | Joan Noguera, Kiko Ruiz & Jorge Torregrossa | TV series (10 Episodes); Spanish Actors Union – Supporting Performance, Female; Nominated – Atv Awards – Best Actress |
| 2016 | Joséphine s'arrondit | Gilles's mother | Marilou Berry | |
| 2016 | Nacida para ganar | Victoria | Vicente Villanueva | |
| 2016 | Madres Libres | Candela | Auriane Lacince & Viktoria Videnina | Short |
| 2016 | Capitaine Marleau | Mother Louise | Josée Dayan | TV series (1 Episode) |
