= The Lighthouse of the Orcas =

2016 film by Gerardo Olivares

- Spanish: El faro de las orcas
- Directed by: Gerardo Olivares
- Screenplay by: Gerardo Olivares
- Based on: Agustín corazónabierto by Roberto Bubas
- Starring: Maribel Verdú; Joaquín Furriel; Joaquín Rapalini
- Production companies: Wanda Vision; Historias Cinematográficas; Puenzo Hermanos; Pampa Films
- Distributed by: Wanda Films (es); Buena Vista International (ar)
- Release dates: 16 December 2016 (Spain); 13 April 2017 (Argentina)
- Running time: 110 minutes
- Countries: Spain; Argentina
- Language: Spanish

The Lighthouse of the Orcas (Spanish: El faro de las orcas) is a 2016 Spanish-Argentine drama film directed by Gerardo Olivares. It stars Maribel Verdú and Joaquín Furriel.

It is based on the novel Agustín corazónabierto by Roberto Bubas.

Together with Olivares' two previous films, Entrelobos (2010) and Brothers of the Wind (2015), The Lighthouse of the Orcas forms a trilogy about the animal-human relationship.

== Synopsis ==
In trying to help her son find an emotional connection, a mother travels with her autistic son to Patagonia to meet a park ranger and wild orcas.

== Cast ==
- Maribel Verdú as Lola
- Joaquín Furriel as Beto Bubas
- Joaquín Rapalini as Tristán (as Quinchu Rapalini)
- Ana Celentano as Marcela
- Ciro Miró as Manolo
- Osvaldo Santoro as Bonetti
- Federico Barga as Quiñones
- Zoe Hochbaum as Martina
- Alan Juan Pablo Moya as Inti
- Juan Antonio Sánchez as Junco
- Eduardo 'Camión' Domínguez as Anciano
- Roberto Bubas as Hombre
- Isidoro del Carmen as Esquilador
- Errol Kenny Hughes as Paisano
- Maria A. Abraham as Camarera

== Production ==
A joint Spanish-Argentine co-production, the film was produced by Wanda Vision, Historias Cinematográficas, Puenzo Hermanos and Pampa Films and it had support from TVE, ICAA and the Ibermedia programme.

Shooting locations included Patagonia (Argentina) and Fuerteventura (Spain).

== Release ==
Distributed by Wanda, the film was theatrically released in Spain on December 16, 2016. The opening in Argentine theatres was scheduled for 13 April 2017 by Disney. Netflix acquired the global distribution rights.

== See also ==
- List of Spanish films of 2016
