= La Gran final =

- Directed by: Gerardo Olivares
- Screenplay by: Chema Rodríguez
- Produced by: Wanda Films, Greenlight Media AG
- Starring: Zeinolda Igiza, Shag Humar Khan, Abu Aldanish, Kenshleg Alen Khan, Boshai Dalai Khan
- Cinematography: Gerardo Olivares, Guy Gonçalves
- Edited by: Rori Sainz de Rozas, Raquel Torres
- Music by: Martín Meissonnier
- Release date: 2006
- Running time: 88 minutes
- Countries: Germany; Spain

La Gran final (English: The Great Match) is a 2006 film directed by Gerardo Olivares.

== Synopsis ==
How is it possible that children living in the remotest part of the Mongolian steppes know who Ronaldo is? This film tells the adventurous story of three heroes, none of whom have ever met, but who nevertheless have two things in common. Firstly, they all live in the furthest corners of the planet and, secondly, they are each determined to see on TV the final in Japan of the 2002 World Cup between Germany and Brazil. The protagonists in this 'global' comedy are a family of Kazakh nomads from Mongolia, a camel caravan of Tuaregs in the Sahara, and a group of indigenous people in the Amazon. They all live about 500 kilometres away from the next town—and the next television—making their task particularly daunting. Nevertheless, they all possess the resourcefulness and the willpower to achieve their goal.

== Reception ==
La Gran final was screened at the African Film Festival of Cordoba. It won several international awards and was selected to participate, among others, in the Berlin International Film Festival. The film was an official selection at the Copenhagen International Film Festival, the Galway Film Fleadh, the World Cinema Festival, Cape Town and the Desert Nights Filmfest, Rome. It was nominated for Best Film at the Málaga Spanish Film Festival.

== See also ==
- Docufiction
- List of docufiction films
