= Jorge Sanz =

Spanish actor (born 1969)

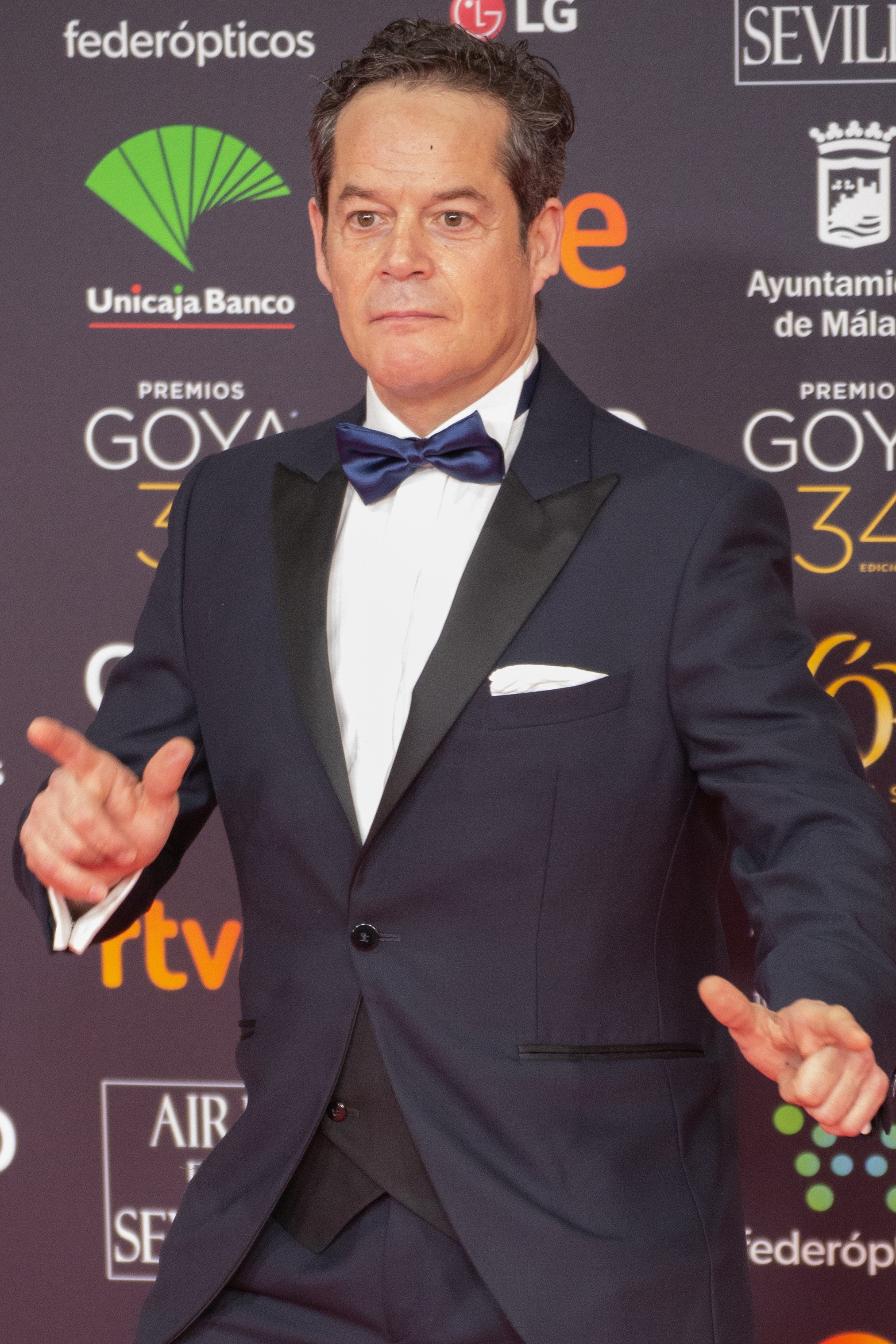
- At the 34th Goya Awards in 2020
- Born: Jorge Sanz Miranda; 26 August 1969 (age 57); Madrid, Spain
- Occupation: Actor

Jorge Sanz Miranda (born 26 August 1969) is a Spanish actor and one of the most prominent actors of the Spanish cinema since the 1980s. He is known to international audiences for his roles in the films: Amantes (1991) by director Vicente Aranda and Fernando Trueba’s Belle Époque (1992).

== Early life ==
Jorge Sanz Miranda was born on 26 August 1969 in Madrid. The youngest of five children, he would have followed a military career in the footsteps of his father, but his mother took him to an audition when he was nine years old and he was cast as the son of Jane Birkin in the film La Miel (1979) directed by Pedro Masó. From then on, he started a prolific career as an actor mostly in commercial films. His self-confidence and naturalness before the camera made him a popular actor in the Spanish screens.

Between the ages of nine and fifteen, he played in ten features within and beyond the Spanish film industry. Most notably as the young Conan in Conan the Barbarian (1982), a role played as an older Conan by Arnold Schwarzenegger. His role as a rascal in Crónica del alba. Valentina (1982), based upon the novel of Ramón J. Sender, won him his first acting award at the San Sebastian Film Festival.

== Career ==
Sanz's roles in the films of Fernando Trueba and Vicente Aranda solidified his career. In 1986 he starred with Maribel Verdú, in Year of Enlightment. In 1988, he had the leading role in Vicente Aranda’s If They Tell You I Fell, for which he obtained a Goya Award for Best Actor. He followed this success with two more film under Vicente Aranda's direction, Riders of the Dawn (1990), a made for TV miniseries, and Lovers (1991) that was an international success. Two years later, he starred in Belle Époque, directed by Fernando Trueba. This film won the Oscar as a best foreign film. Jorge Sanz gave two of his best performances in Lovers and Belle Époque and these works remain his better-known international films.

The decade of the 1990s confirmed his popularity and he made two roles per year. Combining comedies Why Do They Call It Love When They Mean Sex? (1992) and Cha-cha-chá (1997) with more dramatic roles: Morirás en Chafarinas (1994), Libertarias (1995) although he admits that it feels more comfortable with comic roles. He has also alternated cinema with television. Taking part in television series such as Riders of the Dawn or comedies like Colegio Mayor (1993-95), Pepa y Pepe (1995) and A las once en casa (1999).

He made two more successful films with Fernando Trueba: The Girl of Your Dreams (1998) and The Shanghai Spell (2002).

== Accolades ==
Year	Award	Category	Work	Result	Ref.
1987	1st Goya Awards	Best Actor	Year of Enlightment	Nominated	
1989	3rd Goya Awards	Best Supporting Actor	El Lute II: Tomorrow I'll be Free	Nominated	
1990	4th Goya Awards	Best Actor	If They Tell You I Fell	Won	
1992	6th Goya Awards	Best Actor	Lovers	Nominated	
1993	7th Goya Awards	Best Actor	Belle Époque	Nominated	
1998	13th Goya Awards	Best Supporting Actor	The Girl of Your Dreams	Nominated	
2008	17th Actors and Actresses Union Awards	Best Film Actor in a Secondary Role	Oviedo Express	Nominated	

== Bibliography ==
- Holmstrom, John. The Moving Picture Boy: An International Encyclopaedia from 1895 to 1995. Norwich, Michael Russell, 1996, p. 375-376.
- D’Lugo, Marvin: Guide to the Cinema of Spain, Greenwood Press, 1997. ISBN 0-313-29474-7
- Perriam, Chris: Star and Masculinity in Spanish Cinema: From Banderas to Bardem, Oxford University Press, 2003. ISBN 0-19-815996-X.
