= The Osha Rule =

Spanish horror film

- Theatrical release poster
- Spanish: Maleficio (la regla de Osha)
- Directed by: Ángel González
- Written by: Ángel González; Sara Vicente Laguna
- Produced by: Sangre Yoruba; Paul Mateos Verdejo; Egoitz Rodriguez
- Starring: Mariela Garriga; Blas Polidori; Edgar Vittorino; Noakis Salazar; Felipe Londoño; Sambou Diaby
- Cinematography: David Fernández
- Edited by: Federico Patón Ibáñez
- Music by: Santiago Gonzalo "Bronquio"
- Production companies: Blacklight Films; Euskalreel; Sangre Yoruba AIE
- Distributed by: SelectaVisión
- Release date: 3 October 2025
- Country: Spain
- Language: Spanish

The Osha Rule is a 2025 Spanish supernatural horror film directed by Ángel González and starring Mariela Garriga.

== Premise ==
A social worker tries to save two young gang member siblings who are troubled by seemingly supernatural forces.

== Cast ==
- Mariela Garriga as Belén
- Edgar Vittorino as Yoruba
- Blas Polidori
- Juliana Yaconis
- Noakis Salazar
- Felipe Londoño
- Adil Koukouh

== Production ==
The film is co-written by Ángel González and Sara Vicente Laguna with González directing. It is produced by Sangre Yoruba, Paul Mateos Verdejo and Egoitz Rodriguez, with Blacklight Films and Euskalreel acting as co-producers. Principal photography took place in July and August 2024 in Bilbao, Spain.

The cast is led by Mariela Garriga and Edgar Vittorino as well as Blas Polidori, Juliana Yaconis, Noakis Salazar, Felipe Londoño, and rapper Adil Koukoul, in his screen debut. Images from filming were released to the media in January 2025 with the film in post-production.

The soundtrack of the film includes music by Audry Funk and the duo Lérica.

== Release ==
The film is expected to be released theatrically in Spain on 3 October 2025 by SelectaVisión.
