= La huella del crimen =

Spanish anthology television series

- Genre: True crime
- No. of seasons: 3
- No. of episodes: 14 + 1 film

Production
- Producer: Pedro Costa Musté
- Production company: Televisión Española

Original release
- Network: TVE1
- Release: 12 April 1985 – 8 March 2010

La huella del crimen (transl. The trace of the crime) (Note: The Spanish word huella can be translated into English as trace, footprint, fingerprint or impression.) is a Spanish prime-time anthology true crime television series that narrates some of the most lurid crimes that occurred in the late 19th and 20th centuries in Spain. Produced by Televisión Española and directed by renowned film directors, its three seasons and fourteen episodes were broadcast on La Primera of Televisión Española between 1985 and 2010. An additional story, initially intended as an episode of the series, was theatrically released as a standalone feature film titled Lovers in 1991.

== Premise ==
Created and produced by Pedro Costa for Televisión Española, each of the series' episodes is directed by a renowned film director who was invited to recount a true crime in 16 mm film format. Each standalone story stars a different ensemble cast of well-known actors of the time. The series, only authorized for audiences over eighteen years old, caused a great impact in Spain due to the crudeness of the crimes.

== Episodes ==
Season	Episodes	Originally released	
Season	Episodes	First released	Last released
1	6	12 April 1985	24 May 1985
2	5	13 February 1991	13 March 1991
3	3	30 September 2009	8 March 2010

=== La huella del crimen 1 ===
No. overall	No. in season	Title	Directed by	Original release date	Spain viewers (millions)	Ref.
1	1	"El caso de las envenenadas de Valencia"	Pedro Olea	12 April 1985	N/A	
Account of the case against Pilar Prades, executed for poisoning three women in 1959 in Valencia. It stars Terele Pávez as Pilar Prades, Susana Canales as Isabel Juncosa and Alfred Lucchetti as Manuel Juncosa.
2	2	"El crimen del capitán Sánchez"	Vicente Aranda	19 April 1985	N/A	
Account of the murder of Rodrigo García Jalón on 25 April 1913 in Madrid. It stars Victoria Abril as María Luisa Sánchez Noguerol, Fernando Guillén as Captain Manuel Sánchez López and José Cerro as Rodrigo García Jalón. Maribel Verdú makes her debut role as Manolita.
3	3	"El caso del procurador enamorado"	Pedro Costa	26 April 1985	N/A	
Roberto Prieto Gil a member of the Cortes Españolas, hires a killer in 1973 so that his wife suffers an "accident" and he can continue his relationship with his lover. It stars Carlos Larrañaga as Roberto Prieto Gil, Ana Marzoa as Carmen and Pepe Rubio as Rafael Luzón.
4	4	"Jarabo"	Juan Antonio Bardem	10 May 1985	N/A	
Account of the crimes of José María Jarabo, a hit-and-run assassin who killed four people (one of them a pregnant woman) on 19–21 July 1958 in Madrid. It stars Sancho Gracia as Jarabo, María José Alfonso as María de los Desamparados Alonso Bravo and José Manuel Cervino as Inspector Hinojosa.
5	5	"El crimen de la calle Fuencarral"	Angelino Fons	17 May 1985	N/A	
Account of the crime of Fuencarral street on 2 July 1888 in Madrid. It stars Carmen Maura as Higinia Balaguer, Rafael Alonso as the judge and Luis Escobar Kirkpatrick as the doctor.
6	6	"El caso del cadáver descuartizado"	Ricardo Franco	24 May 1985	N/A	
Account of the murder of Pablo Casado, a Barcelonan industrialist whose dismembered corpse was found on 1 May 1929 inside a wooden box at the Atocha station in Madrid. It stars Arnau Vilardebó as Ricardo Fernández Sánchez, Juan Echanove as Asensio Obregón and Francisco Guijar as Pablo Casado.

=== La huella del crimen 2 ===
No. overall	No. in season	Title	Directed by	Original release date	Spain viewers (millions)	Ref.
7	1	"El crimen de las estanqueras de Sevilla"	Ricardo Franco	13 February 1991	N/A	
Account of the double murder of Encarnación and Matilde Silva Montero, in 1952 in Seville. It stars Pepe Soriano as Javier Castillo, Fernando Guillén Cuervo as Fray Antequera and Antonio Dechent as Julián Velasco Pérez.
8	2	"El crimen de Perpignan"	Rafael Moleón	20 February 1991	N/A	
Account of the crime occurred in 1971 in Perpignan. It stars Juanjo Puigcorbé as Antonio Muñoz, Aitana Sánchez-Gijón as Yvette Romero and Laura Cepeda as Lucía.
9	3	"El crimen del expreso de Andalucía"	Imanol Uribe	27 February 1991	N/A	
Account of the robbery on board the express train to Andalusia on 12 April 1924. It stars José Manuel Cervino as Honorio Sánchez Molina, Mario Pardo as Antonio Teruel and Tito Valverde as José María Sánchez Navarrete.
10	4	"El crimen de Don Benito"	Antonio Drove	6 March 1991	N/A	
Account of the double crime occurred on 19 July 1902 in Don Benito (Badajoz). It stars Fernando Delgado as Enrique Donoso Cortés, Francisco Vidal as Carlos García Paredes and Gabino Diego as Tomás Alonso Camacho.
11	5	"El caso de Carmen Broto"	Pedro Costa	13 March 1991	N/A	
Account of the murder of Carmen Broto, a luxury prostitute, in 1949 in Barcelona. It stars Silvia Tortosa as Carmen Broto, Sergi Mateu as Jesús Gimeno López and Ángel de Andrés López as Ramón Muñoz.

=== Lovers ===
Lovers was initially intended as the last episode of the second season to be titled Los Amantes de Tetuán, but its director Vicente Aranda proposed, and Televisión Española agreed, to expand the script and turn it into a feature film for its theatrical release. The film accounts a crime committed by a couple living in the district of Tetuán de las Victorias in Madrid whose tragic outcome took place in La Canal, near Burgos in 1949. Starring Victoria Abril, Jorge Sanz and Maribel Verdú, it was theatrically released on 12 April 1991.

Among many accolades received, the film won the Goya Award for Best Film and Aranda won the Goya Award for Best Director at the 6th Goya Awards. The film entered competition at the 41st Berlin International Film Festival where Abril won the Silver Bear for Best Actress.

=== La huella del crimen 3 ===
No. overall	No. in season	Title	Directed by	Original release date	Spain viewers (millions)	Ref.
12	1	"El crimen de los Marqueses de Urquijo"	Fernando Cámara; Pedro Costa	30 September 2009	2.328	
Account of the assassination of the Marquesses of Urquijo on 1 August 1980 in Madrid. It stars Félix Gómez as Rafael Escobedo, Juanjo Puigcorbé as Inspector Velasco and Ricard Borrás as Enrique Martínez.
13	2	"El secuestro de Anabel"	Luis Oliveros; Pedro Costa	1 March 2010	3.679	
Account of the kidnapping and subsequent murder of Anabel Segura in 1993. It stars Enrique Villén as Antonio Rojas García, Luisa Martín as Juana and Juan Codina as Cirilo.
14	3	"El asesino dentro del círculo"	Fernando Cámara; Pedro Costa	8 March 2010	3.197	
Account of the crimes of Joaquín Ferrándiz Ventura, a serial killer who killed five women between 1995 and 1996 in Castellón. It stars Roger Coma as Joaquín Ferrándiz Ventura, Fernando Huesca as Rovira and Joaquín Climent as Blázquez.

== Accolades ==
=== Seminci ===
La huella del crimen was chosen television series of the year by the Valladolid International Film Festival in 1985. The six episodes of the first season were screened in their film version during the thirtieth edition of the festival and round tables were held with the directors of each of the episodes.

=== FIPA ===
Year	Category	Episode	Result	Ref.
1991	FIPA d'argent	"El crimen de las estanqueras de Sevilla"	Won	

=== Fotogramas de Plata ===
Year	Category	Recipient	Episode	Result	Ref.
1985	Best Television Performer	Terele Pávez	"El caso de las envenenadas de Valencia"	Nominated	
1985	Best Television Performer	Victoria Abril	"El crimen del capitán Sánchez"	Nominated	
1991	Best Television Actor	Juanjo Puigcorbé	"El crimen de Perpignan"	Nominated	
1991	Best Television Actress	Aitana Sánchez-Gijón	"El crimen de Perpignan"	Nominated	
