= Agent Zeta =

- Release poster
- Spanish: Zeta
- Directed by: Dani de la Torre
- Screenplay by: Dani de la Torre; Oriol Paulo; Jordi Vallejo
- Produced by: Pablo Isla
- Starring: Mario Casas; Mariela Garriga; Nora Navas; Luis Zahera
- Cinematography: Josu Inchaustegui
- Music by: Manuel Riveiro
- Production company: Fonte Films
- Distributed by: Amazon Prime Video
- Release date: 20 March 2026
- Running time: 134 minutes
- Country: Spain
- Language: Spanish

Agent Zeta (Spanish: Zeta) is a 2026 Spanish action spy film directed by Dani de la Torre and written by De la Torre, Oriol Paulo and Jordi Vallejo. Led by Mario Casas, the cast also features Mariela Garriga, Nora Navas, and Luis Zahera.

== Plot ==
After the simultaneous killing of four former Spanish intelligence agents involved in the so-called 'Operación Ciénaga', Zeta is tasked by the CNI with tracking a surviving missing agent, joining forces with Colombian intelligence agent Alfa, going on to deal with a mysterious sixth member of the operation, who is codenamed Casiel.

== Cast ==
- Mario Casas as Zeta
- Mariela Garriga as Alfa
- Nora Navas as Elena
- Luis Zahera as Salvador Ancares
- Christian Tappan as Marlon
- Cristina Umaña as Diana
- Nieve de Medina as Zeta's mother
- Pilar Gómez as ambassador to Estonia
- Ricardo de Barreiro as Landa

== Production ==
The project was announced by Amazon Prime Video during the 'Prime Video Presents' event in July 2024, with Mario Casas reported as a lead. The film is a Fonte Films (Pablo Isla) production, with Carla Perez Albéniz and Fátima Dapena taking over executive production duties. In September 2024, it was reported the beginning of filming in Galicia. Shooting locations included Monforte de Lemos, and Tallinn.

== Release ==
Amazon Prime Video released the film on 20 March 2026.

== Reception ==
Javier Ocaña of El País lamented that the ambitious film delivers a shallow denouement, while also featuring a large degree of over-explanations to spoon-feed plot developments to cell-phone watchers.

Alfonso Rivera of Cineuropa pointed out that, lack of any particular artistic or cinematic merit notwithstanding, the film's "production values are impeccable, its pace relentless and its editing frenetic", promising "pure escapist pleasure".

In a 2-star rating, Manuel J. Lombardo of Diario de Sevilla lamented that the film surprisingly self-sabotages by coming to a sudden halt to provide explanations when no one needed them.

== See also ==
- List of Spanish films of 2026
