= ANA. all in =

Spanish television series

- Promotional poster
- Spanish: Ana Tramel. El juego
- Genre: Legal thriller
- Created by: Roberto Santiago
- Based on: Ana by Roberto Santiago
- Screenplay by: Roberto Santiago; Ángela Armero
- Directed by: Salvador García; Gracia Querejeta
- Starring: Maribel Verdú; Natalia Verbeke; Israel Elejalde; Luis Bermejo; Unax Ugalde
- Opening theme: "Una y otra vez" by Marlango & Guille Galván
- Countries of origin: Spain; Germany
- Original language: Spanish
- No. of seasons: 1
- No. of episodes: 6

Production
- Running time: 58–62 min
- Production companies: RTVE; Tornasol; DeAPlaneta; ZDF Enterprises

Original release
- Network: RTVE Play
- Release: 21 September 2021

ANA. all in (Spanish: Ana Tramel. El juego) is a Spanish legal thriller limited television series adapting the Roberto Santiago's novel Ana. It is jointly produced by RTVE, Tornasol, DeAPlaneta and ZDF Enterprises. Directed by Salvador García and Gracia Querejeta, the series stars Maribel Verdú for the leading role. It was released on RTVE Play on 21 September 2021.

== Premise ==
After Alejandro is accused of killing the manager of the Gran Castilla Casino, his sister Ana Tramel (a lawyer at a low ebb) sets up a small team to pick up an unequal fight versus the powerful gambling industry.

The fiction is set in Madrid, and some parts also take place in Pamplona.

== Cast ==
- Maribel Verdú as Ana Tramel.
- Natalia Verbeke as Concha.
- Israel Elejalde as Moncada.
- Luis Bermejo as Eme.
- Unax Ugalde as Alejandro Tramel.
- María Zabala as Sofía.
- Bruno Sevilla as Gerardo.
- Pepa Pedroche as Ronda.
- Ismael Martínez as Ramiro.
- Víctor Clavijo as Gabriel.
- Biel Montoro as Andrés.
- Juanma Cifuentes as Friman.
- Tomás del Estal as Santonja.
- Carlos Olalla as Pons.
- Joaquín Climent as Barver.
- Elvira Mínguez as Jueza Rezano.
- Yulia Demoss as Helena.

== Production and release ==
Created by Roberto Santiago, the series is an adaptation of his own novel Ana, and it is produced by the Spanish public broadcaster RTVE together with Tornasol, DeAPlaneta and the German producer ZDF Enterprises. Consisting of 6 episodes featuring a running time of around 60 minutes, filming started in Pamplona in June 2020. The episodes were directed by Salvador García and Gracia Querejeta, whereas the screenplay was written by Santiago himself together with Ángela Armero. RTVE announced the release date of the full series on RTVE Play for 21 September 2021, the same date as the debut of the linear TV run on La 1. The opening of the series features illustrations by Paula Bonet and a theme song ("Una y otra vez") performed by Marlango and Vetusta Morla's Guille Galván.

No.	Title	Original release date
1	"La apuesta"	21 September 2021
2	"La demanda"	21 September 2021
3	"Fantasmas"	21 September 2021
4	"La traición"	21 September 2021
5	"La sangre"	21 September 2021
6	"El lobo"	21 September 2021

== Accolades ==
Year	Award	Category	Nominee(s)	Result	Ref.
2021	60th Monte-Carlo Television Festival	Best Fiction (series)		Finalist	
2021	27th Forqué Awards	Best Actress (TV series)	Maribel Verdú	Nominated	
2022	9th Feroz Awards	Best Main Actress in a Series	Maribel Verdú	Nominated	
2022	30th Actors and Actresses Union Awards	Best Film Actress in a Secondary Role	Natalia Verbeke	Nominated	
2022	9th Platino Awards	Best Actress in a Miniseries or TV Series	Maribel Verdú	Pending	
