= Paula Bonet =

Spanish book illustrator and painter

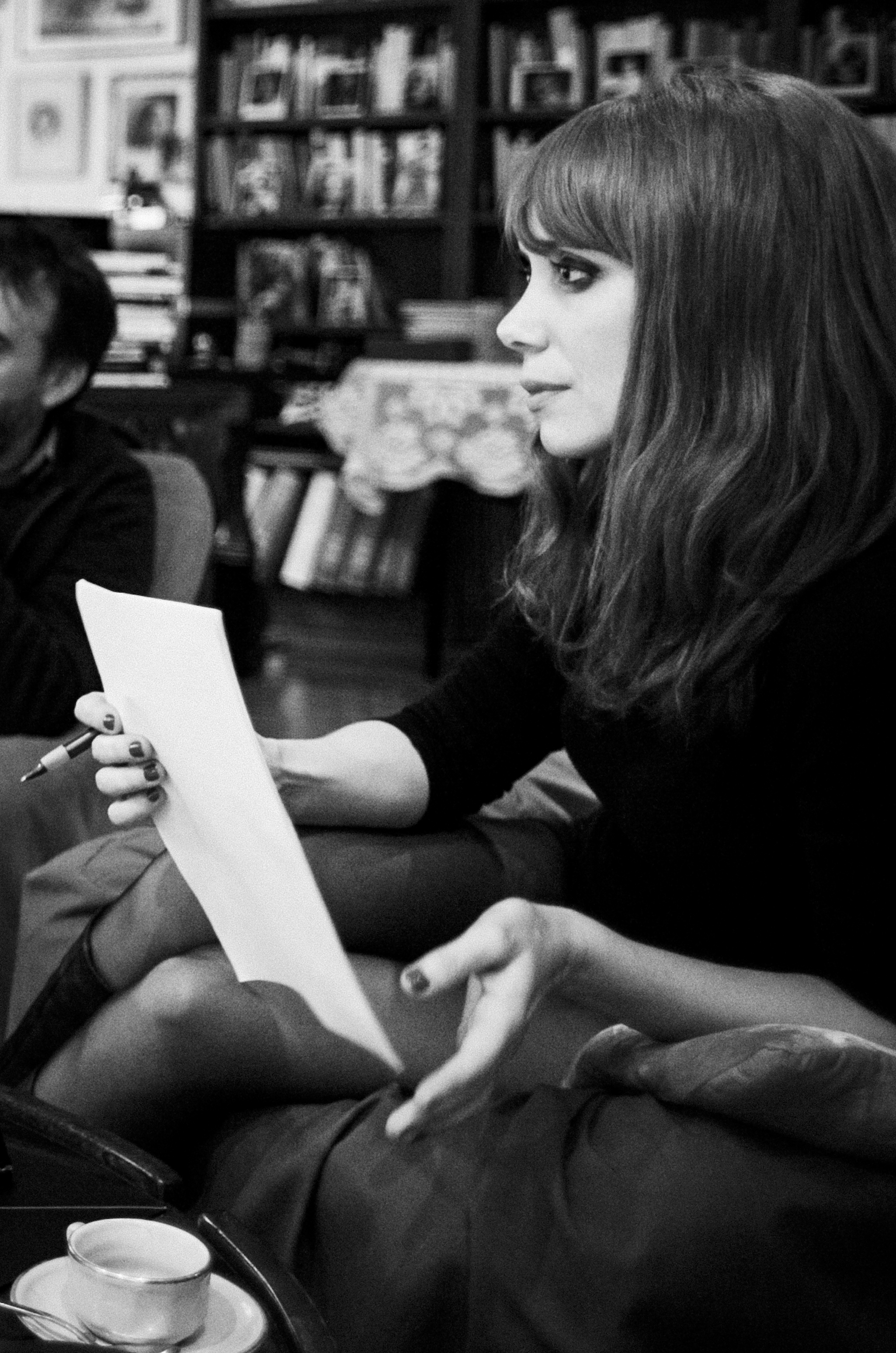
- Born: 1980 (age 44–45); Villa-real, Spain
- Occupation: Writer, Illustrator, Painter

Signature
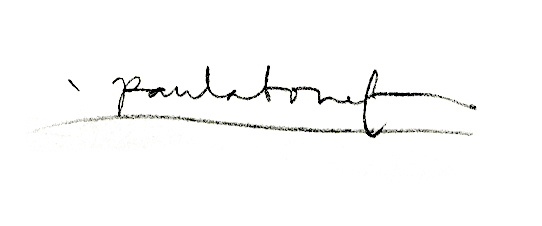

Website
- El web de Paula Bonet

Paula Bonet (born 1980 in Vila-real, Spain) is a Spanish book illustrator and painter. She has taken part in various projects and books, such as the book of poems called "Si uneixes tots els punts" ("If you connect all the points") written by Estel Solé and the work "T'estimo, ets perfecte, ja et canviaré" directed by Elisenda Roca. She became famous mainly because of the illustrations she began doing in 2009, she has hundreds of thousands of followers on social networks.

== Biography ==
She was born in Vila-real. As a child, she loved everything related to drawing as a way of expressing herself artistically. At the age of 14 she joined a drawing academy in her home city, Vila Real, this was the start of what would become, years later, her profession. After completing secondary school, she decided to study Fine Arts even though many of her relatives and friends told her she should study other careers which have more professional output. When Paula was 17 she was admitted to the Polytechnic University of Valencia to study Fine Arts. Once she completed these studies, she decided to spend time abroad continuing her university studies. She travelled to Santiago de Chile and for four months she studied at PUC. After that, she went to New York thanks to a scholarship and studied at the NYU for six months. Since she was 25, almost every summer she has travelled to Urbino (Italy) to take some prestigious short courses.

She was very clear that studying abroad would help to open her mind, searching for new horizons and discovering new influences. For four years she found it difficult to combine her teachers' job at a school in Valencia (Spain) and her job as an illustrator. So she decided to concentrate totally on illustration. After five months, she moved to Barcelona where she could find greater artistic movements. Nowadays, she receives new job offers almost every day. She gained many fans by word of mouth. Most of her followers are female. Since then, her illustration skills have appeared on buses, murals and advertisements. She has exhibited in some European cities, such as, Porto, Florencia or Paris, without forgetting Barcelona and Valencia. She is a fan phenomenon with over 360,000 followers on her official social networks.

== Illustration techniques ==
She used to work with engraving (lithography, screen printing, chalcography) and oil painting techniques. In 2009 she started introducing illustration into her work. She feels comfortable drawing illustrations and adding text. Paula tries to make it fifty-fifty. The illustrations support the texts and vice versa. "They are not explained illustrations neither illustrated texts".

== Publications ==
- 813 (La Galera, Spanish and Catalan edition, 2015)
- La pequeña Amelia se hace mayora (Spanish edition) / La petita Amèlia es fa gran (Catalan edition) (Combel Editorial, 2014).
- Qué hacer cuando en la pantalla aparece The End (Lunwerg, 2014)
- Léeme (Spanish edition) / Llegeix-me (Catalan edition) (Andana Editorial, 2012).
