= Mariela Garriga =

Cuban actress (born 1989)

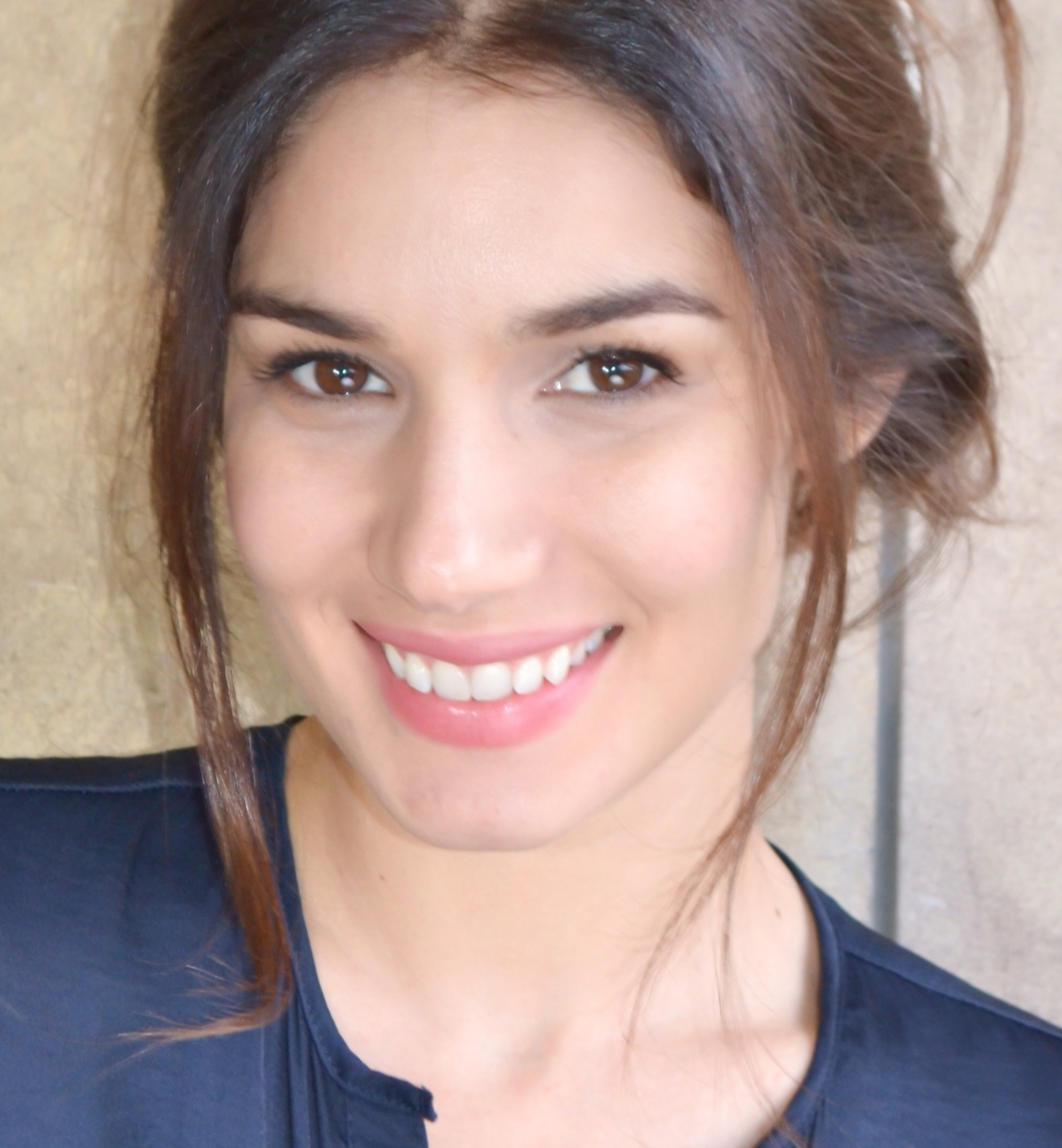
- Garriga in 2014
- Born: 1989 (age 36–37); Havana, Cuba
- Occupation: Actress

Mariela Garriga (born 1989) is a Cuban actress. Since moving in 2009 to Milan, she has featured in a number of Italian and American productions. She plays Marie in Mission: Impossible – Dead Reckoning Part One and its sequel Mission: Impossible – The Final Reckoning.

== Early life ==
Born in Havana, Cuba in 1989, Garriga began working in theatre and TV as a teenager and appeared on the show Cuban Television Ballet. Garriga stated that she is of Spanish ancestry. In 2009, she relocated to Italy and became a model, and studied at Michael Rodgers Acting Studio in Milan. She then moved from Italy to the United States in 2016, and studied in New York City at the Terry Schreiber Studio, as well as The Actors Studio. Italian productions Garriga starred in include Gli uomini d'oro directed by Vincent Alfieri as well as the comedy Chi m'ha visto directed by Alessandro Pondi. She had a recurring role in the Italian television series Murders at Barlume, directed by Roan Johnson. Garriga was a series regular on The Last Defectors in 2017 and 2018.

== Career ==
She starred in the Blumhouse Productions film Bloodline (2018). She appeared in the horror anthology Nightmare Cinema (2018).

Her television credits include a recurring role on NCIS: Los Angeles, as well as Law & Order: Special Victims Unit. and NCIS. She had a part playing Facio in the biopic series Bosé for Paramount+.

Garriga made her debut for the role of Marie in the Mission: Impossible franchise in the seventh instalment, Mission: Impossible – Dead Reckoning Part One (2023). She reprised her role in Mission: Impossible – The Final Reckoning (2025). In 2025, she was cast as Mary Magdalene in the Mel Gibson film The Resurrection of the Christ: Part One, and commenced filming in the role in October 2025 in Italy.

== Personal life ==
Garriga lives between Los Angeles, U.S., Italy and Cuba. She is married to Stefano Mongardi.

== Filmography ==
Key
†	Denotes films that have not yet been released

=== Film ===
Year	Title	Role	Notes
2011	Wedding in Paris	French Burlesque Dancer	
2013	Colpi di fortuna	The Astronaut	
2014	Amici come noi	Laura	
2015	Credence	Ms. Fate	Short film
2016	Romane Simon: Life of Gia the Movie	Jessica	
2016	Miami Beach	Carmen	
2017	Chi m'ha visto	Sally	
2018	Nightmare Cinema	Sister Patricia	Segment: "Mashit"
2018	Bloodline	Lauren Cole	
2018	Sombra City	Ariadne	Short film
2019	Gli uomini d'oro	Gina	
2023	Mission: Impossible – Dead Reckoning Part One	Marie	
2024	Close to Me	Amanda	
2025	Mission: Impossible – The Final Reckoning	Marie	
2025	The Osha Rule	Belén	
2026	Agent Zeta	Alfa	
2027	The Resurrection of the Christ: Part One †	Mary Magdalene	Post-production
2028	The Resurrection of the Christ: Part Two †	Mary Magdalene	Post-production

=== Television ===
Year	Title	Role	Notes
2013	Horror Vacui	Anna	8 episodes
2015	The Young Montalbano	Annarosa	Episode: "Un'albicocca"
2016	Inspector Coliandro	Remedios	Episode: "Salsa e merengue"
2017	Law & Order: Special Victims Unit	Elana Marks	Episode: "Gone Fishin'"
2017–2018	The Last Defectors	—N/a	Television series
2017–2020	NCIS: Los Angeles	Pietra Rey	2 episodes
2018–2019, 2026	Murders at Barlume	Carmen	3 episodes
2020	L'alligatore	Victoria	2 episodes
2021	Luis Miguel: The Series	Daisy Fuentes	Episode: "Entrégate"
2022	NCIS	Maria Díaz	Episode: "Last Dance"
2023	Bosé	Giannina Facio	Episode: "Bravo Ragazzi"
2025	When Nobody Sees Us	Magaly Castillo	
