= Crime Wave (2018 film) =

- Theatrical release poster
- Spanish: Ola de crímenes
- Directed by: Gracia Querejeta
- Screenplay by: Luis Marías
- Produced by: Ghislain Barrois; Álvaro Augustin; María Luisa Gutiérrez; Santiago Segura; Luis Marías; Eduardo Carneros
- Starring: Maribel Verdú; Juana Acosta; Paula Echevarría; Antonio Resines; Raúl Arévalo; Luis Tosar; Javier Cámara
- Cinematography: Ángel Amorós
- Edited by: Leire Alonso
- Music by: Federico Jusid
- Production companies: Telecinco Cinema; Bowfinger International Pictures; Historias del Tío Luis; Crimen Zinema A.I.E.
- Distributed by: Universal Pictures International Spain
- Release date: 5 October 2018
- Running time: 98 minutes
- Country: Spain
- Language: Spanish

Crime Wave (Spanish: Ola de crímenes) is a 2018 Spanish black comedy film directed by Gracia Querejeta. The cast, led by Maribel Verdú, also features Juana Acosta, Paula Echevarría, Antonio Resines, Raúl Arévalo, Luis Tosar and Javier Cámara.

== Plot ==
Set in Biscay, the plot follows the mishaps of Leyre, a well-off and happily divorced woman whose son has killed his father in a fit of rage, doing whatever it takes for the crime to remain unsolved, henceforth unleashing a wave of crimes across Bilbao and its surroundings.

== Cast ==
- Maribel Verdú as Leyre Blanco
- Juana Acosta as Susana Salazar
- Paula Echevarría as Vanesa
- Antonio Resines as Andoni Galarza
- Raúl Arévalo as El taxista
- Luis Tosar as Cosme
- Javier Cámara as Capellán
- Asier Ricarte as Asier
- Miguel Bernardeau Dato as Julen

== Production ==
The screenplay was penned by Luis Marías. The film is a Telecinco Cinema, Bowfinger International Pictures, Historias del Tío Luis and Crimen Zinema A.I.E. production and it had the participation of Mediaset España and Movistar+. It was shot in 2017 in locations of Biscay, including Getxo, Bilbao and Portugalete, as well as in Madrid.

Luis Marías, Ghislain Barrois, Álvaro Augustin, María Luisa Gutiérrez, Santiago Segura and Eduardo Carneros were credited as producers.

== Release ==
Distributed by Universal Pictures International Spain, the film was theatrically released in Spain on 5 October 2018.

== Reception ==
Reviewing for El Periódico de Catalunya, Beatriz Martínez rated the film with 2 out of 5 stars, lamenting the tone and the overly histrionic performances, considering that, despite welcoming the attempt to turn male archetypes into female ones, the result is uneven and nears a "retrograde" discourse.

Sergio F. Pinilla of Cinemanía gave the film 3 out of 5 stars, considering that Verdú does it well enough to sustain the film by herself, concluding that it was "silly, yes, but attractive".

Jordi Batlle Caminal of Fotogramas scored 3 out of 5 stars, highlighting the "perfectly matched" cast, while deeming the Querejeta's "stingy" mise-en-scène as the worst feature of the film.

Javier Ocaña of El País deemed Crime Wave to be a "deficient" film, configured as a madcap black comedy, yet rarely finding the right tone.

Luis Martínez of Metrópoli gave it 3 out of 5 stars, considering Crime Wave a film "as liberating as absolutely free. Feverish and suicidal. All at the same time", where "it is obligatory to surrender to Verdú's ability to be herself in many more ways than imaginable".

== See also ==
- List of Spanish films of 2018
