= Enrique Meneses =

Spanish journalist (1929–2013)

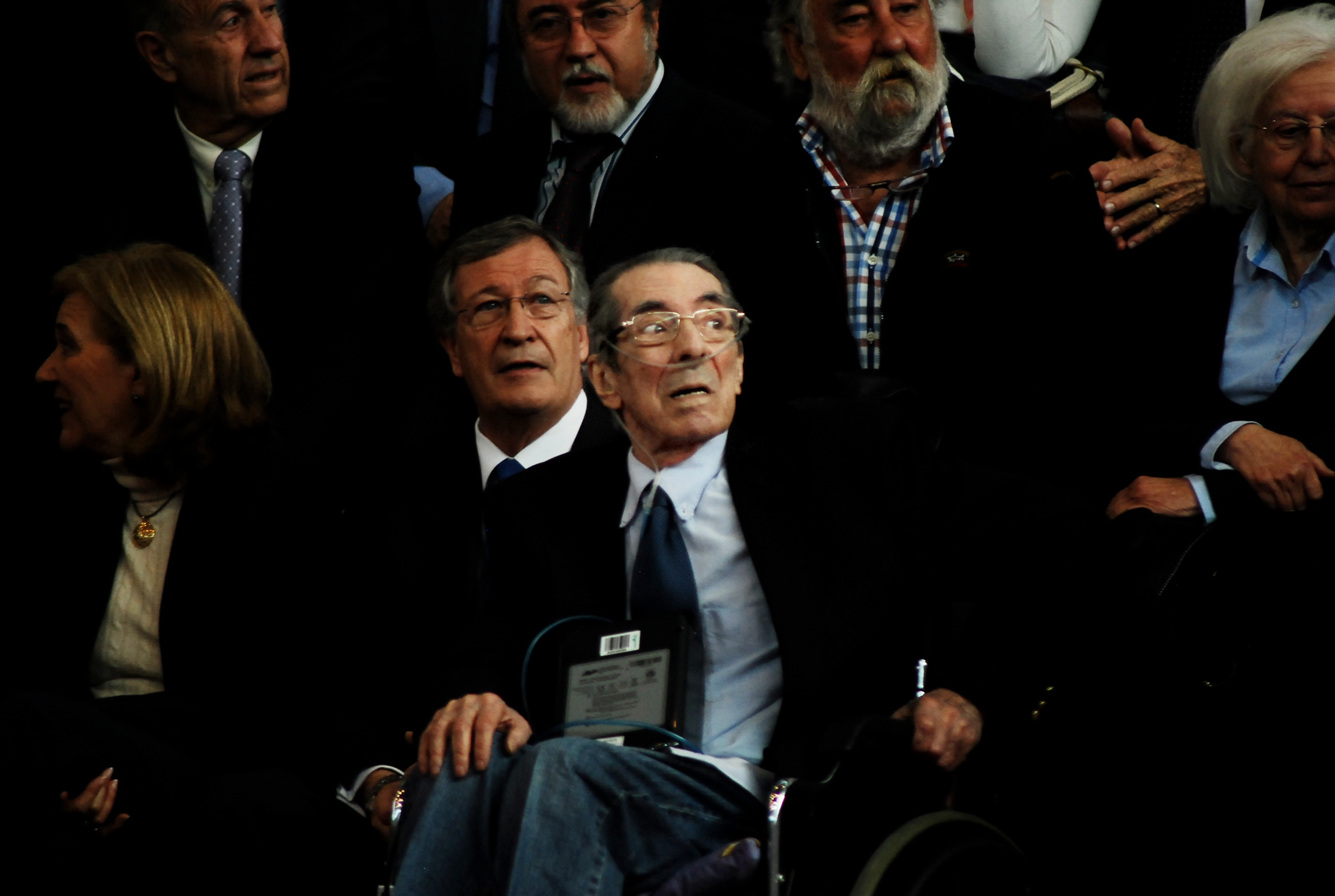
- Meneses in March, 2012
- Born: Enrique Meneses Miniaty; October 21, 1929; Madrid, Spain
- Died: January 6, 2013 (aged 83); Madrid, Spain
- Education: University of Salamanca, Liceo Francés Jules Supervielle
- Occupations: Photojournalist and Film Director
- Years active: 1947–1993
- Employer: Paris Match
- Notable work: Fidel Castro The Maquisard, Paris Match (1958)
- Television: La Bolsa y La Vida (1981)
- Spouse(s): Barbara Montgomery (married –1977); Annick Duval
- Children: 3
- Parents: Enrique Meneses Puertas (father); Carmen Miniaty (mother)
- Awards: 2009 VIII Miguel Gil Moreno Prize for Journalism
- Website: https://www.enriquemeneses.es/

Enrique Meneses (October 21, 1929 – January 9, 2013) was a Spanish journalist, photographer, author, and director. Meneses is most famous for his 1958 Paris Match photo essay covering Fidel Castro, Che Guevara and the Cuban Revolution.

== Early life ==
Enrique Meneses was born in Madrid on October 21, 1929. Meneses spent his childhood and school years in Madrid until the Spanish Civil War broke out. His family was able to move to Biarritz, France, until it came under Nazi occupation in 1940. The Meneses family was again forced to move eventually settling in Estoril, Portugal.

The Meneses family was upper class heir to a multi-million dollar silver metal casting factory founded by Leonacio Meneses. With some of his inheritance Enrique's father published his magazine Cosmópolis, then opening a news agency Prensa Mundial. Meneses spent time around the office of Prensa Mundial meeting and being influenced by many journalists.

Through the encouragement of his father, Meneses studied law at the University of Salamanca in an attempt to pursue a diplomatic career but ended up dropping out to found his first press agency.

== Career ==
=== Early career ===
Meneses did his first reporting at age 17 when he covered the death of Spanish bullfighter Manolete. Despite the financial setback of spending more on transportation than his earnings from the assignment, the experience solidified a conviction to explore the world in pursuit of stories.

After declining journalism scholarship at Stanford University in 1951, opting instead to accept a position with Reader's Digest Meneses traveled around Europe reporting and learning different languages. After depleting his savings in 1954 Meneses received money from his mother and made a permanent move to Cairo, Egypt. While in Cairo, Meneses became a contributor to several foreign newspapers and traveled all across Africa.

Meneses would become employed by the weekly French magazine publication Paris Match, after being referred for the job by his long-time mentor and Shahrokh Hatami. This lead him to his first big reporting opportunity covering the Suez Canal Crisis in 1956. After arriving in Egypt he informed the other journalists he was headed to the front lines and hailed a taxi that took him to the fighting between Israeli and Egyptian troops. While covering the fighting two of his colleagues Magnum's David Semour and Paris Match's Jean Roy were killed in close proximity to Meneses by Egyptian gunfire.

During this period Meneses established himself as a photographer with little interest in creating images with a stylistic or aesthetic tone opting instead for a more robust voiceless photojournalistic style. Spanish photographer and photo editor Chema Conesa describes his work as if his camera were as rudimentary as a pencil with its only ability to focus the gaze on a fact or event.

=== Cuban Revolution ===
A 28-year-old Meneses ran away with his 19-year-old first cousin in 1957 to escape an arranged marriage she was to be subjected to. Eventually becoming romantic with her they traveled around France, Switzerland, and Germany before she was taken by police in Belgium and returned to her mother. She was sent to Costa Rica to live with her father, a newly appointed diplomat to the country. Meneses followed by getting Paris Match to send him to Cuba to cover the construction of the Havana Tunnel by a French company. The plan was after the assignment he would travel to Costa Rica to reconnect with his cousin.

While assigning the Havana Tunnel story, Paris Match Editor Dedé Lacaze informed Meneses that he was interested in the bubbling Cuban revolution plot to overthrow Cuban president Fulgencio Batista. Lacaze requested if Meneses was able to get images of the revolutionaries in addition he would be thrilled. While in the air traveling to Cuba Meneses learned that the Cuban National Army were surrounding revolution leader Fidel Castro. Meneses dropped the original assignment and headed for the Siera Maestra to find the revolutionaries.

Paris Match had no resources in Cuba so Meneses was on his own to find the revolutionaries and stay out of trouble. Many other reporters were stopped by Cuban officials when they were identified as press so to avoid being detected by Cuban police and military Meneses took multiple precautions: Camera equipment was mailed to the country inside of a box filled with bottles of whiskey. For travel arrangements Meneses flew into Rancho Boyeros in Havana and took public buses to reach mountains unlike his colleagues who were stopped flying into the closer Antonio Maceo Airport. Meneses was eventually guided up the Siera Maestra to revolutionaries, evading the military checkpoints and becoming the first reporter to reach Fidel Castro. On arrival Che Guevara hung a sign reading "International Press Club" on the door of Meneses bohío where he would live for the next ten months.

During Meneses time in the Siera Maestra he photographed the daily life of Fidel Castro and the 26th of July Movement. Meneses dove deep into the movement's relationship with the peasants and their leader Crescencio Perez who guided them in the mountain. Meneses was able to show a remarkably intimate look at the operation including the during the Battle of Pino del Agua. He also made some of the only known photographs of Che Guevara in the Siera Maestra mountains.

Over his time with the guerrillas Meneses cultivated a relationship with Fidel Castro, who was interested in what he had experienced documenting Suez Canal Crisis. Castro often asked about how Gamal Abdel Nasser had redistributed land, built cooperative farming units and resisted the Israeli counterinsurgency. Meneses scoffed at the assertion that any of this would work, sharing in his writing that he saw Nasser's attempts as an utter failure and a total utopian dream.

Once the project was nearing completion the logistical hurdle of getting Meneses' negatives out of Cuba began. To avoid detection from the Batista government he had his negatives sewn inside of a petticoat belonging to the youngest daughter of Colonel Ferrer who was able to deliver them undetected. When the Batista police caught wind of this they detained and interrogated Meneses until Spanish ambassador, Juan Pablo de Lojendio e Irure, intervened to have him expelled from Cuba.

Paris Match published the images spread over three issues, on March 8, 1958, April 12, 1958 and April 19, 1958. Meneses would be paid 3,000,000 Spanish pesetas (equivalent to $797,084 in 2025) from Paris Match for his 11 months of work and an additional $50,000 (equivalent to $557,958 in 2025) from CBS.

Meneses was sent to New York City by Paris Match in June 1958 to make images of ongoing protests related to the Cuban Revolution.

== Criticism ==
Though Meneses was sympathetic to the Cuban revolutionaries at the time of photographing them, his retrospective writings became increasingly critical of the movement and of Fidel Castro. Meneses also received criticism from multiple scholarly journals in relation to his reporting in his retrospective book Fidel Castro: Siete Años de Poder. Academics believed that Meneses created a superficial account with limited details on significant events in his book. Academics also believed the characterization of Castro and Guevara in the book appeared inconsistent with the established historical precedent.

== Published books ==
No.	Title	Publisher	Date	Genre	Length	ISBN
1	Fidel Castro	Taplinger Publishing Company	1966	Non-Fiction	238 pp	
A retrospective look at Enrique Meneses time documenting Fidel Castro and the Cuban Revolution.
2	Nasser, el último faraón	Prensa Española	1968	Non-Fiction	366 pp	
Retrospective and reporting on the Middle East and Gamal Abdel Nasser.
3	La Bruja Desnuda	Alce	1976	Essay	267 pp	9788485262045
Essay on witchcraft.
4	Seso y Sexo	Editorial Campus	1979	Essay	231 pp	9788485293155
Commentary on the relationship between the brain and sex.
5	Escrito en carne	Planeta	1981	Non-Fiction	296 pp	9788432035739
A biographical behind the scenes look at Meneses reporting through the years.
6	Una experiencia humana: Robinson en África	Planeta	1984	Non-Fiction	301 pp	9788432043307
Meneses experiences in Africa.
7	Castro, Empieza La Revolucion	Espasa Calpe	1995	Non-Fiction	185 pp	9788423997022
A retrospective look at Enrique Meneses time documenting Fidel Castro and the Cuban Revolution.
8	África de Cairo a Cabo	Plaza & Janés	1998	Non-Fiction	254 pp	9788401540554
Detailed account of Meneses travels through Africa before decolonization.
9	Hasta aquí hemos llegado	Rústica	2006	Autobiography	592 pp	9788415374794
Autobiography detailing the life of Enrique Meneses.
