= Brothers of the Wind =

- Film poster
- Directed by: Gerardo Olivares; Otmar Penzer
- Written by: Gerardo Olivares; Gerald Salmina
- Produced by: Claude Héroux
- Starring: Jean Reno; Manuel Camacho; Tobias Moretti
- Cinematography: Óscar Durán; Otmar Penker
- Edited by: Karin Hartusch
- Music by: Sarah Class
- Distributed by: Terra Mater Factual Studios
- Release date: 29 January 2016
- Running time: 98 minutes
- Country: Austria
- Language: English

Brothers of the Wind is a 2016 English-language Austrian coming of age-drama film directed by Gerardo Olivares and Otmar Penker and starring Jean Reno, Manuel Camacho and Tobias Moretti.

== Plot ==
In the 1960s, in an undetermined place in the Alps, an eagle couple has two hatching eggs. When both eaglets are born, their mother knows that she must only raise one as their successor. In an ensuing fight with another eagle, the eaglets' father dies when he crashes to the ground. One of the eaglets shortly falls from the nest, and his mother, due by nature to maintain the survivor, ignores the eaglet's cry for help.

Meanwhile, forester Danzer (Jean Reno) meets with a boy named Lukas (Manuel Camacho) and his father Keller (Tobias Moretti). They both live in a new house in the mountains, after the death of Maria (Eva Kuen), mother of Lukas and Keller's wife, as a result of a fire. Keller, gravely afflicted by the death of his wife, fails to live in harmony and understanding with his son, who takes refuge more and more in nature, avoiding contact with his father. As a retreat Lukas constantly goes to the remains of his old house, where he often sees the photograph of his deceased mother.

As Lukas' dog Scout is taking a walk in the forest, Lukas comes across the eaglet, and Lukas decides to raise him to full health. Lukas takes the eaglet to his old house to take care of him. Danzer also meets the eaglet, and decides to help Lukas for the affection he feels for him.

The forester tells Lukas that the food he has given the eaglet is not good. He also tells him to give sunlight to the eaglet. When a fox sneaks in and kills Keller's hens, he angrily chases Lukas. Lukas, fearful for the safety of the eaglet, goes to his family's hut. Lukas rescues the eaglet from the attacking foxes. As Lukas stays and reads his family's Bible, he comes across the story of Cain and Abel. Aptly fitting the eaglet's own story, Lukas names it Abel.

As Lukas takes care of Abel, Danzer arrives and invites Lukas to go live with him during the summer and also allows Abel to come with them. He gives Lukas a restrain to be able to catch Abel. When Lukas and Abel arrive, Lukas sees a portrait of a young boy and an eagle. Lukas catches a fish with his own hands for Abel, but Abel lets it slip away. In the meantime, Abel's mother hunts foxes and weasels for both her and her son.

As both Abel and his brother grow their new pair of wings, Lukas tries to help Abel fly. Eventually Abel starts to soar in the air. Lukas decides to spend that night in his old house. Next day, however, Abel is missing. Lukas then sees Abel fly around. Abel perches on top of a rock, but as Lukas tries to reach Abel, Abel flies away, making Lukas sad. Danzer tries to comfort Lukas by saying Abel only wants to experience the wild, but confesses he doesn't really know what will be of Abel.

Abel tries to hunt a chamois but fails. As Lukas ponders about Abel's whereabouts, he realizes the two dangers Abel will face; his father's shotgun, and Abel's own brother, whom Lukas has symbolically named Cain. After three days, Abel finally returns to Lukas. Danzer offers to help Lukas how to teach Abel to hunt. Keller, however, complains of Danzer's methods, and warns him. Regardless, they still train Abel with a makeshift method.

Lukas and Danzer get scared when they think Abel is trying to hunt Scout, but later they see Abel simply hunted a weasel. Danzer, nevertheless, tells Lukas that Abel will have to leave someday, and Lukas sadly agrees. As Lukas and Danzer take a blindfolded Abel to an unknown part of the mountains, Lukas bids a farewell to Abel. After taking the blindfold, they let Abel fly.

In winter, Abel learns to hunt and feed himself. Lukas, remembering his animal friend, later finds a small memorial that he made with a pile of rocks and one of Abel's feathers. As he awakens from sleeping, Lukas sees a wolf nearby. As Lukas runs away, he accidentally steps on a bear trap. Danzer, who happens to be nearby, scares the wolf away with his rifle and helps Lukas heal. Unfortunately, the rift between Lukas and Keller grows wider.

Danzer tells the story of the Brothers of the Wind to Lukas. Lukas wonders how the story ends. Danzer believes that even after knowing the last page they would still not know the outcome.

Lukas decides to leave Keller. Unfortunately, as he leaves, Keller finds him, and asks Lukas to light a match for him. When Keller lights the match, Lukas believes that Keller killed his mother by arson. As Lukas escapes into the mountains, Keller goes after him. Lukas searches for Abel, but a rock slide started by a fox stops Lukas from climbing the mountain. A lightning strikes nearby, knocking Lukas unconscious. Abel soars over him, and Keller wakes him up, stating he is sorry for his ill treatment. An eagle appears to be killed by the rock slide.

Two years later, Lukas and Keller walk by. Lukas says he feels Abel still lives, but Keller tells him he was the dead eagle of the rock slide. Keller then tells Lukas to stretch his arm. Flying above, Abel appears and perches on Lukas' arm. Lukas, deciding it is time to let Abel go for good, takes off a bracelet he put on Abel's foot long time ago. As Danzer watches from the distance, Abel soars into the sky. Finally, Abel and a female eagle await the arrival of a new hatch, thus continuing the circle of life.

== Cast ==
- Jean Reno as Danzer
- Manuel Camacho as Lukas
- Tobias Moretti as Keller
- Eva Kuen as Maria

== Reception ==
Common Sense Media said that they "Highly recommended for both its visual beauty, its respect for the natural order of life in the wild, and its inspiring coming-of-age story."

Cinemagazine gave it a 2.5 rating.
