= When No One Sees Us =

Spanish television series

- Spanish: Cuando nadie nos ve
- Created by: Daniel Corpas
- Based on: When Nobody Sees Us by Sergio Sarrias
- Written by: Arturo Ruiz
- Directed by: Enrique Urbizu
- Starring: Mariela Garriga; Maribel Verdú; Austin Amelio; Ben Temple; Dani Rovira; Lucía Jiménez
- Country of origin: Spain
- No. of series: 1
- No. of episodes: 8

Production
- Executive producers: Antonio Asensio; Paloma Molina; Salvador Yagüe; Miguel Salvat; Antonio Trashorras; Patricia Nieto
- Production company: Zeta Studios

Original release
- Network: Max
- Release: 7 March 2025 – present

When No One Sees Us (Spanish: Cuando nadie nos ve) is a television series starring Mariela Garriga and Maribel Verdú. It is adapted from the Sergio Sarria novel of the same name. It is the first Spanish-produced series announced for streaming service Max. The series premiered on 7 March 2025.

== Premise ==
Set in Morón de la Frontera during Holy Week next to Morón Air Base, a sergeant in the Civil Guard investigates an unusual suicide of a neighbor. Meanwhile, a lieutenant with Air Force Office of Special Investigations has been sent to the air base to find the whereabouts of a missing American airman.

== Cast ==
- Maribel Verdú as Sergeant Lucía Gutiérrez
- Mariela Garriga as Lieutenant Magaly Castillo
- Austin Amelio as Sergeant Andrew Taylor
- Ben Temple as Colonel Seamus Hoopen
- Dani Rovira as Victor Martin
- Dani Téllez as Roberto Navas
- Joe Manjón as Miles Johnson
- Lorca Prada as Samuel Navas
- Jorge Suquet as Antonio Jiménez
- Numa Paredes as Claudia
- María Alfonsa Rossot as Carmen
- Lucia Jiménez as Macarena
- Eloy Azorín as Ramón
- Virginia de Morata
- Carlos Beluga as Leiva
- Ana María Vivancos as Emilia Navas

== Production ==
The eight-part series was commissioned in June 2023, to be produced by Zeta Studios. It is the first Spanish-produced series announced for streaming service Max. Antonio Asensio, Paloma Molina and Salvador Yagüe are executive producers for Zeta Studios. Miguel Salvat, Antonio Trashorras and Patricia Nieto are executive producers for Warner Bros'.

The show is directed by Enrique Urbizu. It was created by Daniel Corpas and a screenwriting team led by Arturo Ruiz. It is adapted from the Sergio Sarria novel of the same name. Filming began in Madrid in February 2024, with filming locations also including Seville and Andalusia.

The cast is led by Maribel Verdú and Mariela Garriga, with Austin Amelio, Ben Temple and Dani Rovira.

== Reception ==
Margaret Lyons of The New York Times billed the series as "one of the better foreign-crime dramas in ages — focused, beautiful, sturdy but artful".
