= Maestro Reverendo =

- Also known as: Maestro Reverendo
- Born: Ángel Muñoz-Alonso; 1955; Madrid, Spain
- Died: September 2012 (aged 56–57)
- Genres: Rock and roll, pop
- Occupations: Musician, composer
- Instrument: Piano
- Years active: 1970s-2003

Maestro Reverendo (born Ángel Muñoz-Alonso; 1955 – 7 September 2012) was a Spanish musician and composer.

He was born and died in Madrid, where he started playing the piano at the school of Escolapios; he earned the nickname Reverendo (Reverend) when he worked as an organist in the church of San Antón. He began his rock career in the 1970s in the band Desmadre 75, more famous for its song Saca el güiski, cheli; later, with the group Paracelso, he won the first two editions of the Rock Villa de Madrid Awards in 1978 and 1979. During the 1980s he collaborated with bands like Siniestro Total or Los Ronaldos and played with Miguel Ríos.

He composed themes and soundtracks in Galician for Televisión de Galicia. His artistic career was linked from the late 1970s to El Gran Wyoming, including his time in the satirical program Caiga quien caiga. He retired in 2003.
