= Captain Sánchez's Crime =

- La huella del crimen episode
- Episode no.: Season 1 Episode 2
- Directed by: Vicente Aranda
- Written by: Alvaro del Amo; Vicente Aranda
- Cinematography by: Juan Amorós
- Original air date: 1985
- Running time: 63 minutes

"Captain Sánchez's Crime" (Spanish: "El Crimen del Capitán Sánchez") is a 1985 Spanish drama film, made for television in 16 mm as an episode of the Televisión Española anthology series La huella del crimen. Directed by Vicente Aranda, it starred Fernando Guillén, Victoria Abril and José Cerro. It was based on a real crime which occurred in 1913.

== Plot ==
In Madrid, Manuel Sánchez, a widower with six children and an elderly father, struggles to support his large family with his meager salary as member of the Spanish army. His passion for gambling does not help his dire circumstances. Manuel's eldest daughter, Maria Luisa, works ironing in a factory. Father and daughter supplement their income skimming out money and jewelry from unsuspected men, who they trap in a relationship with the daughter in order to demand money to repair her honor.

Father and daughter also have an incestuous relationship that has been going on for years. While at the casino in the company of his father, Maria Luisa meets Rodrigo Garcia Jalón, a rich old widower. Jalón, who is also a gambler, is smitten by Maria Luisa and begins to entice the young girl into a relationship with her. He offers to provide for her generously if she becomes his lover. Maria Luisa sees the possibility of a life of freedom away from the tight rule of her father. She gleefully accepts Jalón's attention. When Captain Sánchez realizes what is going on between the widower and Maria Luisa, he convinces his daughter to trap Jalón in one of their skims and blackmail him for a large amount of money. Following that plan, Maria Luisa invites her paramour to her house, pretending to be alone. Captain Sánchez is hiding, waiting to trap the unsuspected Jalón. All is happening according to plan, but when the captain overhears the sincere love confession of Jalón for his daughter asking to marry him, he becomes outraged. In a fit of jealousy, the Captain grasps an ax and decapitates Jalón.

Captain Sánchez throws the severed head into the fire, and hides the mutilated body on the cellar behind a wall. Meanwhile, Maria Luisa cleans the crime scene. They have gained little money from the crime, except for a ring Jalón was wearing and a token from the casino for a large amount of money. The disappearance of Jalón causes intrigue among the people who knew him, particularly at the casino, where it is a well-known fact that he has not claimed the money from his gambling wins. Maria Luisa goes to the casino to try and cash out the token, which immediately makes her a suspect. When the police come to search her house, they find the mutilated body hidden behind a wall in the cellar. Father and daughter are arrested.

Maria Luisa, who initially denied any knowledge of the crime, later recants her story implicating her father. She also accuses him of sexually abusing her for many years; they had two children together who died shortly after birth. Captain Sánchez also talks against her daughter proclaiming his innocence, but he says the dishonor his daughter has brought upon him is more than he can bear, and he asks for the death penalty.

During the trial, the lawyers acting for daughter and father blame each other. The captain is condemned to death, and Maria Luisa is sentenced to 30 years in jail. After Captain Sánchez is executed in an open field, Maria Luisa receives the rosary her father held up to the end. A voice-over informs viewers that she eventually lost her sanity, and died in prison twelve years after her father.

== Production ==
This film was developed as an episode of La huella del crimen, a Spanish anthology television series by Televisión Española which depicted infamous crimes happening in Spain, and for which famous Spanish film directors were invited to make an episode in 16 mm.

== Cast ==
- Fernando Guillén as Capitán Sánchez
- Victoria Abril as Maria Luisa
- Maribel Verdú as Manuelita
- José Cerro as Jalón
- Pep Munné as lover

== Awards and nominations ==
- Nominated, Fotogramas de Plata: Best Actress in leading role for TV (Victoria Abril, 1985)

== DVD release ==
"El Crimen del Capitán Sánchez" is available on Region 2 DVD.

== Bibliography ==
- Cánovás Belchí, Joaquín (ed.), Varios Autores,: Miradas sobre el cine de Vicente Aranda, Murcia: Universidad de Murcia, 2000.P. Madrid
- Colmena, Enrique: Vicente Aranda, Cátedra, Madrid, 1986, ISBN 84-376-1431-7
- Guarner, José Luis: El Inquietante Cine de Vicente Aranda, Imagfic, D.L.1985.
