= Maribel Verdú =

Spanish actress (born 1970)

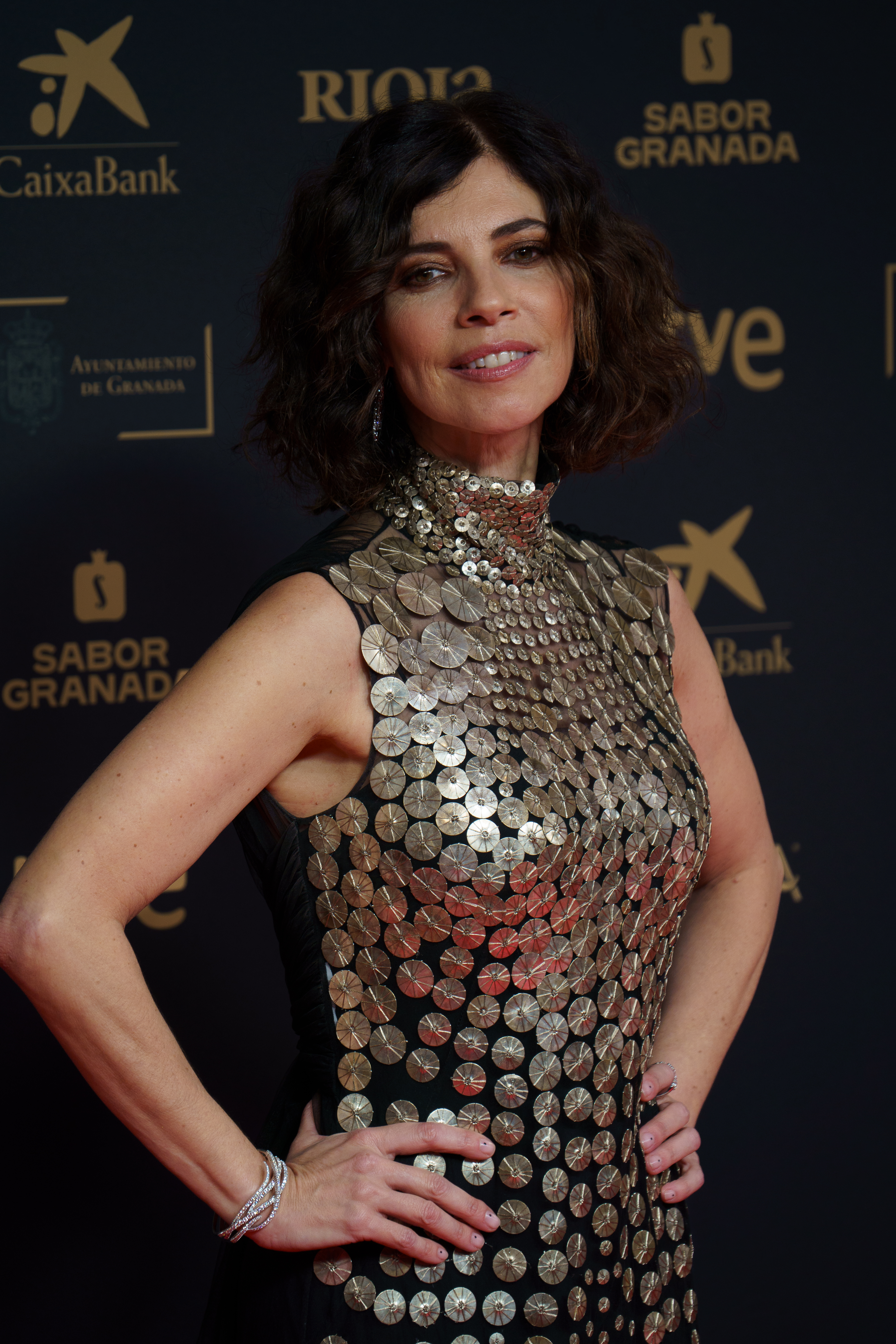
- Verdú in 2025
- Born: María Isabel Verdú Rollán; 2 October 1970 (age 56); Madrid, Spain
- Occupation: Actress
- Years active: 1985–present
- Spouse: Pedro Larrañaga (m. 1999)

María Isabel Verdú Rollán (born 2 October 1970), better known as Maribel Verdú (Spanish: [maɾiˈβel βeɾˈðu]), is a Spanish actress. She is the recipient of numerous accolades throughout her career spanning nearly four decades, including two Goya Awards for Best Actress, an Ariel Award for Best Actress, the Gold Medal of the Academy of Cinematographic Arts and Sciences of Spain in 2008 and the National Cinematography Award in 2009.

Verdú made her acting debut at thirteen in Captain Sánchez's Crime (1985). Some of her film credits include performances in Lovers (1991), Belle Époque (1992), Lucky Star (1997), Y tu mamá también (2001), Pan's Labyrinth (2006), The Blind Sunflowers (2008), Tetro (2009), Snow White (2012), and Abracadabra (2017). She also appeared as Nora Allen in the DC Extended Universe film The Flash (2023), her second superhero film credit after Superlópez (2018).

== Early life ==
Verdú was born in Madrid, Spain. She began acting at 13, appearing in various commercials. She left school at the age of 15, so that she could fully devote herself to her acting career. Verdú has appeared in more than 60 movies, since 1984, the majority of them in Spanish. She has also been on numerous TV shows.

== Career ==
Her first work experience was as a model in spots and fashion magazines for known commercial firms. Her first television opportunity was given to her at 13, featuring in the anthology series La huella del crimen, directed by Vicente Aranda in the episode "Captain Sánchez's Crime".

She made her feature film debut in El sueño de Tánger at age 14, starring alongside Fabio Testi. Shot in 1985, the film underwent a production hell, and was not released until 1991. Her first appearance in a theatrical release was thus in the 1986 film El orden cómico.

27 Hours, by Montxo Armendáriz, about a girl who is a drug addict, was one of the most powerful experiences in her life, up to that point. After this film, other more important films started coming her way, including Hostages in the Barrio by Eloy de la Iglesia and Year of Enlightment by Fernando Trueba.

Later, Verdú said that her role in Lovers marked a turning point in her screen career and has brought about maturity as a performer. Thereafter, she worked with such directors as José Luis Garci in Cradle Song; Bigas Luna in Golden Balls; again with Trueba in the Academy Award winner Belle Époque; Emilio Martínez-Lázaro in Backroads; Carlos Saura in Goya in Bordeaux; and Gonzalo Suárez in The Goalkeeper and Oviedo Express. Verdú's performance in drama Lucky Star (1997) earned her another goya award nomination; she played one-eyed pregnant Marina, in a love triangle with a gelded butcher and a handsome criminal.

She made her debut in an international work in Y tu mamá también (2001), portraying Luisa Cortés, an exotic madrileña who ends up accepting a trip offer across rural Mexico from a Mexican cousin-in-law and his friend. In 2002, she starred as the title character in comedy peplum Lisístrata, playing an Athenian woman setting up a sex strike. She was cast against type to portray maid and guerrilla informant Mercedes in Pan's Labyrinth (2006). Verdú was invited to membership in the AMPAS in 2007. Verdú's performance in Seven Billiard Tables (2007) earned Verdú her first Goya Award for Best Actress.

In 2010, Maribel starred in a music video for Alejandro Sanz's song "Lola Soledad". Verdú's portrayal of Encarna (the evil stepmother) in black-and-white and silent drama film Snow White (2012) won her a second Goya Award. In 2017, she appeared in Abracadabra, starring as Carmen, a housewife who sees her husband's personality transformed as a result of an informal hypnosis session.

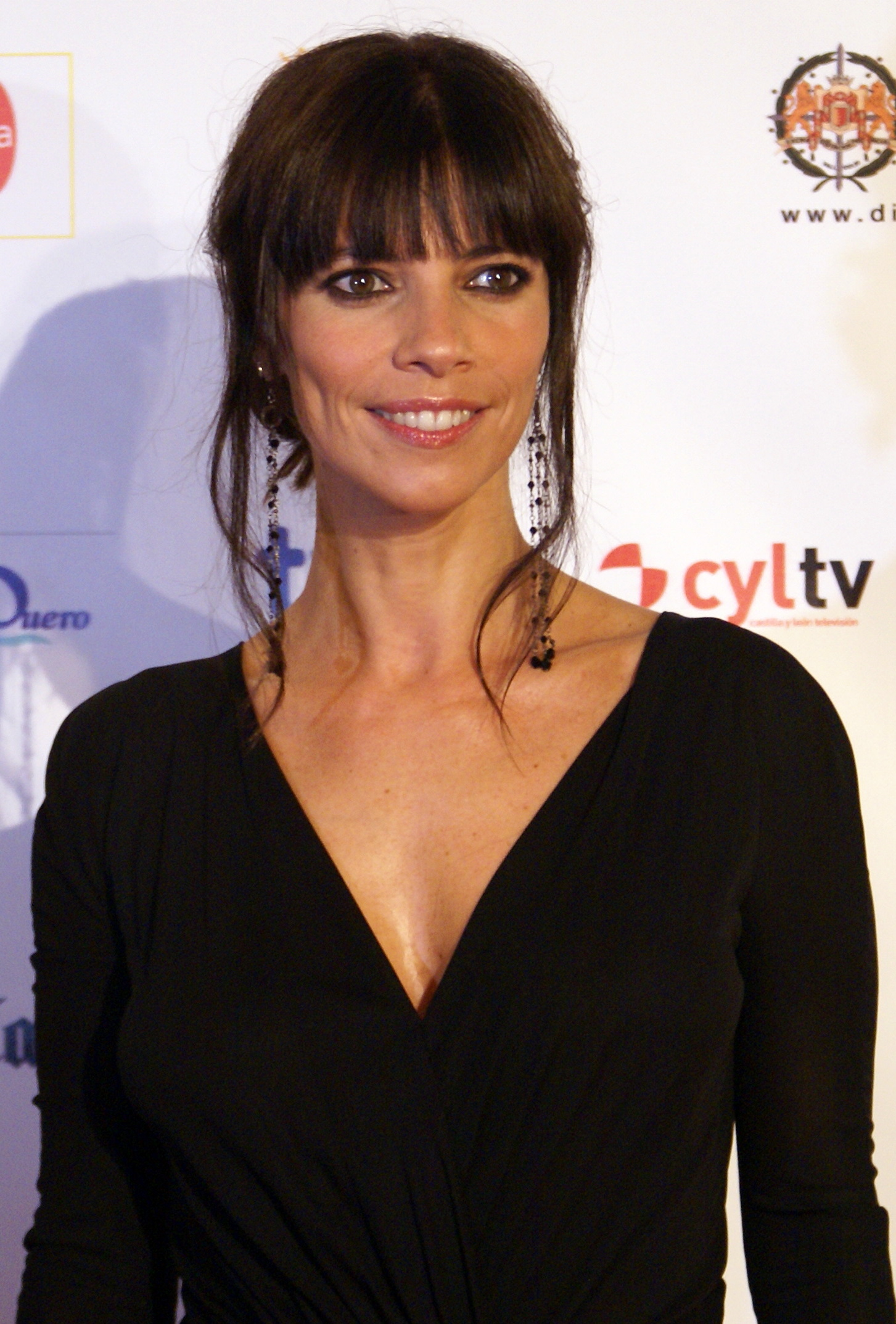
Verdú at the 2011 Valladolid International Film Festival

She made her theater debut in 1986, starring as the character of Julieta and has since then combined theater with cinema. She has also intertwined the two in television shows, such as Turno de oficio and Segunda enseñanza. In 2018, she starred in comedy film Empowered, portraying Paz, an undervalued middle-aged woman who stops keeping quiet about things, and in black comedy Crime Wave as Leyre, a housewife covering the murder of her son's father, unleashing a wave of crimes. She also portrayed Agatha, a villainess from planet Chitón, in superhero comedy film Superlópez, based on the comic book character of the same name.

In 2020, she began shooting legal thriller television series ANA. all in, her first acting credit in television since her work in Código fuego (2003). She starred as Ana Tramel, a drug-addicted lawyer who turns in after her gambling brother is accused of murder in a casino.

In March 2021, she was cast as Barry Allen/The Flash's mother Nora Allen in the DC Extended Universe film The Flash, which was released in June 2023. She also appeared as eccentric millionaire Olivia Uriarte in whodunit film A Deadly Invitation. She also portrayed Carmen, a toxic mother and bon vivant, in season 7 of teen drama series Elite, and the girlfriend and advisor of Leo (Daniel Giménez Cacho) in Familia.

In 2024, she was reported to have joined the shooting of Max series When No One Sees Us, set to star as Lucía Gutiérrez (a Guardia Civil agent investigating a suicide case in Morón de la Frontera) alongside Dani Rovira, Mariela Garriga, Austin Amelio, and Ben Temple. In December 2024, she was awarded the Gold Medal of Merit in the Fine Arts.

== Personal life ==
Verdú married Pedro Larrañaga on 2 September 1999. He is the son of actors Carlos Larrañaga and María Luisa Merlo. Verdú is the stockholder of the clinic Premium in Estepona.

== Accolades ==
Year	Award	Category	Work	Result	Ref.
1992	6th Goya Awards	Best Actress	Lovers	Nominated	
1997	11th Goya Awards	Best Supporting Actress	La Celestina	Nominated	
1998	12th Goya Awards	Best Actress	The Lucky Star	Nominated	
2007	21st Goya Awards	Best Actress	Pan's Labyrinth	Nominated	
2007	16th Actors and Actresses Union Awards	Best Film Actress in a Leading Role	Pan's Labyrinth	Nominated	
2007	49th Ariel Awards	Best Actress	Pan's Labyrinth	Won	
2008	22nd Goya Awards	Best Actress	Seven Billiard Tables	Won	
2008	17th Actors and Actresses Union Awards	Best Film Actress in a Leading Role	Seven Billiard Tables	Nominated	
2008	6th Mestre Mateo Awards	Best Actress	The Mud Boy	Nominated	
2009	23rd Goya Awards	Best Actress	The Blind Sunflowers	Nominated	
2009	18th Actors and Actresses Union Awards	Best Film Actress in a Leading Role	The Blind Sunflowers	Nominated	
2010	24th Goya Awards	Best Actress	Tetro	Nominated	
2012	26th Goya Awards	Best Supporting Actress	Chrysalis	Nominated	
2012	21st Actors and Actresses Union Awards	Best Film Actress in a Secondary Role	Chrysalis	Nominated	
2013	68th CEC Medals	Best Actress	Snow White	Nominated	
2013	27th Goya Awards	Best Actress	Snow White	Won	
2013	22nd Actors and Actresses Union Awards	Best Film Actress in a Leading Role	Snow White	Won	
2014	28th Goya Awards	Best Supporting Actress	15 Years and One Day	Nominated	
2017	72nd CEC Medals	Best Actress	The Lighthouse of the Orcas	Nominated	
2018	23rd Forqué Awards	Best Actress	Abracadabra	Nominated	
2018	5th Feroz Awards	Best Main Actress in a Film	Abracadabra	Nominated	
2018	73rd CEC Awards	Best Actress	Abracadabra	Nominated	
2018	32nd Goya Awards	Best Actress	Abracadabra	Nominated	
2018	5th Platino Awards	Best Actress	Abracadabra	Nominated	
2021	27th Forqué Awards	Best Female Performance in a Series	ANA. all in	Nominated	
2022	9th Feroz Awards	Best Main Actress in a Series	ANA. all in	Nominated	
2022	9th Platino Awards	Best Actress in a Miniseries or TV Series	ANA. all in	Nominated	
2024	32nd Actors and Actresses Union Awards	Best Actress in an International Production	The Flash	Won	

=== Lifetime achievements ===
- Gold Medal of the Academy of Cinematographic Arts and Sciences of Spain in 2008.
- National Cinematography Award by the Spanish Ministry of Culture in 2009.
