= Juan Amorós =

Spanish cinematographer

- Born: 10 June 1936; Barcelona
- Died: 16 November 2016 (aged 80); Madrid
- Occupation: Cinematographer

Juan Amorós (10 June 1936 – 16 November 2016) was a Spanish cinematographer. His career spanned five decades and in 1990 he was nominated for a Goya Award for Best Cinematography for Esquilache. In 1992 he won the Cinema Writers Circle Award for Best Cinematography for Las cartas de Alou. He died in Madrid on 16 November 2016, at the age of 80.

== Filmography ==
- Libertarias
- Reinas
- Celos
- El Amante Bilingüe
- El Crimen del Capitán Sánchez
- Fanny Pelopaja
- Lulú de noche (1986)
- The Trap
- Esquilache
