= Luis Tosar filmography =

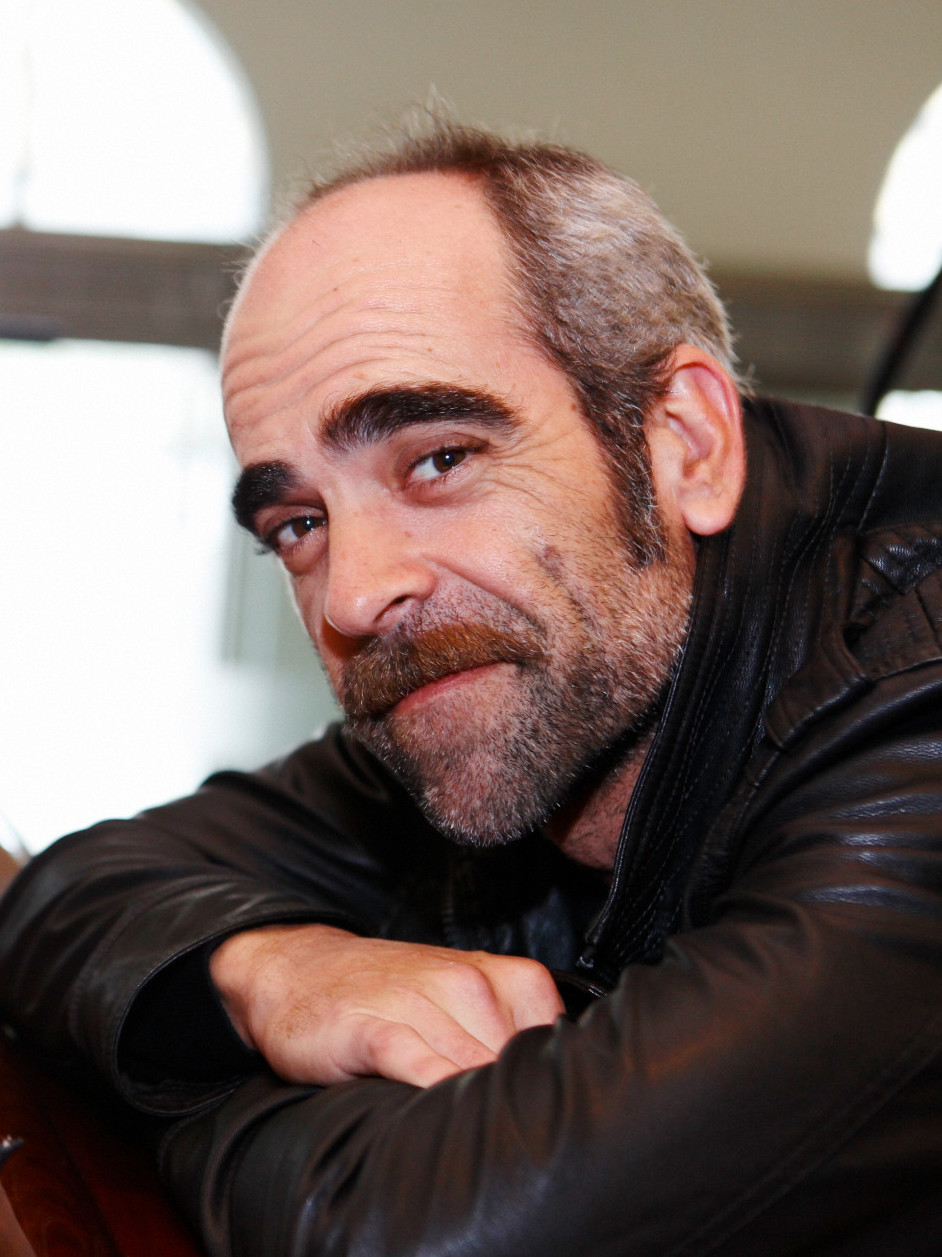
Tosar at the 2013 San Sebastián Horror Film Week

Luis Tosar is a Spanish actor known for his contributions to the Spanish and Galician film industries. He made his feature film acting debut in Atilano for President (1998). He has also featured in some television works.

== Film ==
Key
†	Denotes films that have not yet been released

Year	Title	Role	Notes	Ref.
1998	Atilano, presidente (Atilano for President)	Cazorla	Feature film debut	
1999	Flores de otro mundo (Flowers from Another World)	Damián		
1999	Celos (Jealousy)	Luis		
2000	El corazón del guerrero (Heart of the Warrior)			
2000	Sé quién eres (I Know Who You Are)	Estévez		
2000	El váter susurra			
2000	Leo	Paco		
2000	La comunidad (Common Wealth)			
2000	Besos para todos (Kisses for Everyone)	El Bombilla		
2001	Lena	Gitano		
2001	Visionarios (Visionaries)			
2001	Sin noticias de Dios (Don't Tempt Me)			
2002	Semana Santa (Angel of Death)			
2002	Los lunes al sol (Mondays in the Sun)	José		
2002	Trece campanadas	Mateo		
2003	El lápiz del carpintero (The Carpenter's Pencil)	Herbal		
2003	El regalo de Silvia (Silvia's Gift)	Carlos		
2003	Te doy mis ojos (Take My Eyes)	Antonio		
2003	La flaqueza del bolchevique (The Weakness of the Bolshevik)	Pablo López		
2003	La vida que te espera (Your Next Life)	Rai		
2004	¡Hay motivo!		Segment: "Por tu propio bien"	
2004	Inconscientes (Unconscious)	Salvador		
2005	One Day in Europe	Deportivo-Fan		
2005	El mundo alrededor			
2005	La noche del hermano (La noche del hermano)	Lorenzo		
2005	Aupa Etxebeste!	Ladrón (thief)	Cameo	
2006	Cargo	Baptist		
2006	El don de la duda			
2006	Miami Vice	Montoya		
2006	Las vidas de Celia (Celia's Lives)	Miguel Ángel		
2007	Hotel Tívoli			
2007	Casual Day	Cholo		
2007	Normal con alas	Padre Serafín Amigo		
2008	La noche que dejó de llover	Spleen		
2009	The Limits of Control	Violin		
2009	Celda 211 (Cell 211)	Malamadre		
2010	La sinapsis del códice			
2010	Mr. Nice	Craig Lovato		
2010	18 comidas (18 Meals)	Edu		
2010	Lope (Lope: The Outlaw)	Fray Bernardo		
2010	También la lluvia (Even the Rain)	Costa		
2011	Crebinsky	Comandante estadounidense ('US commander')		
2011	Mientras duermes (Sleep Tight)	César		
2012	El apóstol (The Apostle)	Xavier	Voice work	
2012	Operación E (Operation E)	Crisanto		
2012	Una pistola en cada mano (A Gun in Each Hand)	L.		
2013	Qué pena tu familia	Manuel Añón		
2014	A Night in Old Mexico	Panamá		
2014	Os fenómenos (Aces)	Lobo		
2014	El Niño	Jesús		
2014	Musarañas (Shrew's Nest)	Padre ('father')		
2014	Murieron por encima de sus posibilidades (Dying Beyond Their Means)			
2015	A cambio de nada (Nothing in Return)	Padre de Darío ('Darío's father')		
2015	El desconocido (Retribution)	Carlos		
2015	Ma Ma	Arturo		
2016	Cien años de perdón (To Steal from a Thief)	El Gallego		
2016	Toro	López		
2016	1898, Los últimos de Filipinas (1898, Our Last Men in the Philippines)	Teniente Martín Cerezo		
2017	Plan de fuga (Getaway Plan)	Teniente ('lieutenant')		
2018	Yucatán	Lucas		
2018	Ola de crímenes (Crime Wave)	Cosme		
2018	La sombra de la ley (Gun City)	Aníbal Uriarte		
2019	El increíble finde menguante (The Incredible Shrinking Wknd)	Padre de Alba ('Alba's father')	Voice work	
2019	Quien a hierro mata (Eye For an Eye)	Mario		
2019	Ventajas de viajar en tren (Advantages of Travelling by Train)	Martín Urales de Úbeda		
2019	Intemperie (Out in the Open)	Pastor ('shepherd')		
2020	Adú	Gonzalo		
2020	Hasta el cielo (Sky High)	Rogelio		
2021	Way Down (The Vault)	Simón		
2021	Maixabel	Ibon Etxezarreta		
2022	Código Emperador (Code Name: Emperor)	Juan		
2022	Canallas (Monkey Business)	Luismi		
2022	En los márgenes (On the Fringe)	Rafa		
2023	El fantástico caso del Golem (The Fantastic Golem Affairs)	Toni		
2023	Fatum	Sergio		
2023	Todos los nombres de Dios (All the Names of God)	Santi		
2024	El correo (The Courier)	Paco Escámez		
2024	Tratamos demasiado bien a las mujeres (We Treat Women Too Well)	Antonio		
2024	La infiltrada (Undercover)	Ángel Salcedo		
2024	Amanece en Samaná (Samana Sunrise)	Santi		
2025	La deuda (The Redemption)	Jero		
2025	Golpes	Sabino		
TBA	El Puma †			
TBA	Abril, no es invierno †			
TBA	Porto Rico †			

== Television ==
Year	Title	Role	Notes	Ref.
2020	Los favoritos de Midas (The Minions of Midas)	Víctor Genovés		
2023	Star Wars: Visions	Sith Master	Voice work; Episode: "Sith"	
2024	La ley del mar (The Law of the Sea)	José Durá, "Pepe"		
2024	Zorro	Alejandro de la Vega		
2026	Salvador	Salvador Aguirre		
2026	El homenaje (The Tribute)	Saúl Morvan		
