= Antonio de la Torre filmography =

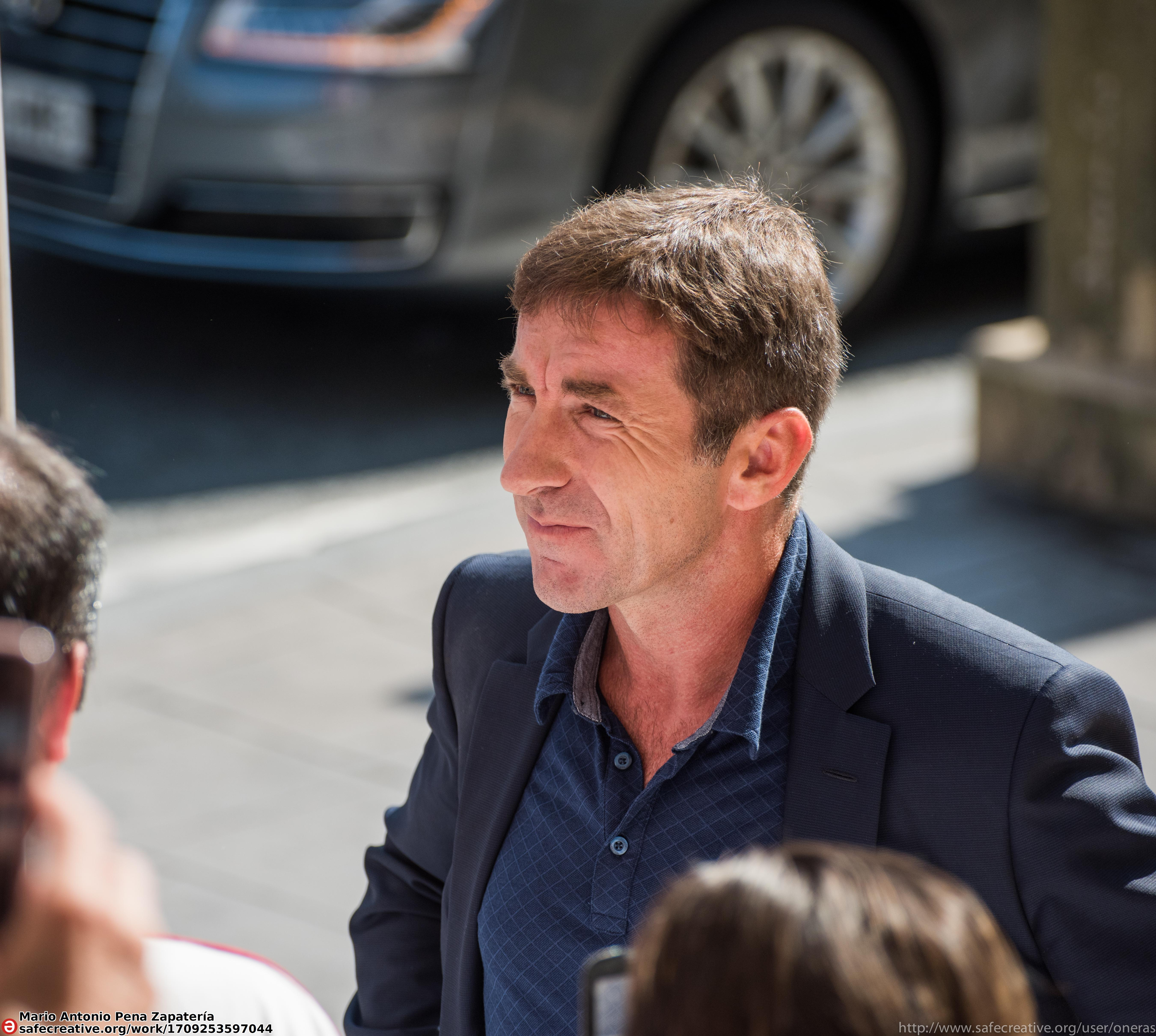

Antonio de la Torre is a Spanish actor known for his contributions to the Spanish film industry, with some credits in international titles. He made his feature film acting debut in The Worst Years of Our Lives (1994). His first Goya Award for Dark Blue Almost Black (2006) was a turning point in his career.

He has also featured in some television works.

== Filmography ==
=== Film ===
Key
†	Denotes films that have not yet been released

Year	Title	Role	Notes	Ref.
1994	Los peores años de nuestra vida (The Worst Years of Our Lives)		Feature film debut	
1995	Cuernos de mujer			
1995	Belmonte			
1995	Morirás en Chafarinas (You Shall Die in Chafarinas)			
1995	Hola, ¿estás sola? (Hi, Are You Alone?)	Joven		
1995	El día de la bestia (The Day of the Beast)			
1996	Los corsarios del chip			
1996	Más que amor, frenesí (Not Love, Just Frenzy)			
1997	En la puta calle (Hitting Bottom)			
1998	Insomnio (Sleepless in Madrid)			
1998	Torrente, el brazo tonto de la ley (Torrente, the Dumb Arm of the Law)	Rodrigo		
1999	Entre las piernas (Between Your Legs)			
1999	Flores de otro mundo (Flowers from Another World)			
1999	Muertos de risa (Dying of Laughter)			
2000	El corazón del guerrero (Heart of the Warrior)			
2000	San Bernardo (Saint Bernard)			
2000	La comunidad (Common Wealth)			
2001	Manolito Gafotas II			
2002	X			
2002	El robo más grande jamás contado (The Biggest Robbery Never Told)			
2002	Poniente (Setting)	Paquito		
2003	Una pasión singular			
2003	El oro de Moscú (Moscow Gold)			
2003	Te doy mis ojos (Take My Eyes)			
2004	El séptimo día (The 7th Day)			
2004	El asombroso mundo de Borjamari y Pocholo (The Amazing World of Borjamari and Pocholo)			
2005	La noche del hermano (The Night of the Brother)			
2005	El Calentito			
2006	Volver	Paco		
2006	AzulOscuroCasiNegro (Dark Blue Almost Black)	Antonio		
2007	Mataharis	Sergio		
2007	El prado de las estrellas (The Field of Stars)	Ramiro		
2007	Blinkers (Salir pitando)			
2008	Cobardes (Cowards)	Joaquín		
2008	Che: Guerrilla			
2008	Una palabra tuya (One Word from You)	Morsa		
2008	Retorno a Hansala (Return to Hansala)	Antonio		
2008	Los años desnudos. Clasificada S (Rated R)	Marcos		
2009	Gordos (Fat People)	Enrique		
2009	La isla interior (The Island Inside)	Iván		
2010	Lope (The Outlaw)	Juan de Vega		
2010	Balada triste de trompeta (The Last Circus)	Sergio, el payaso tonto		
2010	La mitad de Óscar (Half of Oscar)	Taxista		
2010	Carne de neón (Neon Flesh)	Santos		
2010	Dispongo de barcos			
2011	Primos (Cousinhood)	Bachi		
2011	La chispa de la vida (As Luck Would Have It)			
2012	Grupo 7 (Unit 7)	Rafael		
2012	Invasor (Invader)	Diego		
2013	Los amantes pasajeros (I'm So Excited!)	Álex Acero		
2013	Caníbal (Cannibal)	Carlos		
2013	Gente en sitios (People in Places)			
2013	La gran familia española (Family United)	Adán		
2014	United Passions	Enrique Buero		
2014	La isla mínima (Marshland)	Rodrigo		
2015	Felices 140 (Happy 140)	Juan		
2015	Hablar			
2016	Tarde para la ira (The Fury of a Patient Man)	José		
2016	Que Dios nos perdone (May God Save Us)	Velarde		
2017	Abracadabra	Carlos		
2017	El autor (The Motive)	Juan		
2018	La noche de 12 años (A Twelve-Year Night)	Pepe Mujica		
2018	El reino (The Realm)	Manuel López Vidal		
2018	Tiempo después (Some Time Later)	Padre Miñarro		
2019	La trinchera infinita (The Endless Trench)	Higinio Blanco		
2019	El plan (The Plan)	Paco		
2020	Chasing Wonders	Felipe		
2022	Entre la vie et la mort (On the Edge)	Leo Castañeda		
2022	Historias para no contar (Stories Not to Be Told)	Carlos		
2022	Black Is Beltza II: Ainhoa		Voice work	
2023	La contadora de películas (The Movie Teller)	Medardo		
2024	Tratamos demasiado bien a las mujeres (We Treat Women Too Well)	Doce		
2024	Los destellos (Glimmers)	Ramón		
2025	Los Tigres	Antonio		
2026	La bola negra	Vicente		
2026	Sacamantecas (The Harvester)	Juan Díaz de Garayo, "Sacamantecas"		
2027	Caza mayor † (Big Game Hunt)			
TBA	Abril, no es invierno †			

=== Television ===
Year	Title	Role	Notes	Ref.
2002	Padre coraje	El Loren	Miniseries	
2015	Teresa	Inquisidor general Fernando de Valdés	TV movie	
2020	La línea invisible	Melitón Manzanas		
2020	The Spanish Princess	King Ferdinand		
2026	Grande de España (Fading Grandeur)	Don Leandro		
