= Danube Hotel =

- Theatrical release poster
- Spanish: Hotel Danubio
- Directed by: Antonio Giménez-Rico
- Written by: Antonio Giménez-Rico
- Based on: The Red Fish by Carlos Blanco
- Produced by: José Luis Garci
- Starring: Santiago Ramos; Carmen Morales; Mariola Fuentes; Iñaki Miramón; Juan Jesús Valverde; José Sazatornil "Saza"
- Cinematography: Raúl P. Cubero
- Edited by: Miguel G. Sinde
- Music by: Pablo Cervantes
- Production companies: Nickel Odeon Dos; Enrique Cerezo PC; PC 29
- Distributed by: Columbia TriStar Films de España
- Release dates: 2 May 2003 (Málaga); 26 September 2003 (Spain)
- Country: Spain
- Language: Spanish

Danube Hotel (Spanish: Hotel Danubio) is a 2003 Spanish neo-noir thriller drama film written and directed by Antonio Giménez-Rico consisting of a remake of the 1955 film The Red Fish which stars Santiago Ramos and Carmen Morales.

== Plot ==
The plot follows struggling writer Hugo, in a relationship with younger and ambitious chorus girl Ivón, who falls for Hugo's son.

== Cast ==
- Santiago Ramos as Hugo
- Carmen Morales as Ivón
- Mariola Fuentes
- Iñaki Miramón
- Juan Jesús Valverde
- José Sazatornil "Saza"
- María Asquerino
- Fedra Lorente
- José Caride
- Antonio Gamero

== Production ==
The film is a remake of the 1955 film The Red Fish, directed by José Antonio Nieves Conde and written by Carlos Blanco. It is a Nickel Odeon Dos, Enrique Cerezo PC and PC 29 production, with the participation of TVE and Vía Digital. Shooting locations included Santiago de Compostela.

== Release ==
The film was presented at the Málaga Film Festival in May 2003. Distributed by Columbia TriStar Spain, it was released theatrically in Spain on 26 September 2003, grossing €0.328 million (78,862 admissions).

== Reception ==
=== Critical response ===
Jonathan Holland of Variety deemed Hotel Danubio to be an "accomplished exercise in style that harks wistfully back to '40s Hollywood" as well as an "enjoyably mannered, craftily plotted and beautifully produced pic".

=== Accolades ===
Year	Award	Category	Nominee(s)	Result	Ref.
2004	18th Goya Awards	Best Costume Design	Montse Sancho, Lourdes de Orduña	Nominated	
2004	18th Goya Awards	Best Makeup and Hairstyles	Cristóbal Criado, Alicia López	Nominated	
2004	18th Goya Awards	Best Original Score	Pablo Cervantes	Nominated	

== See also ==
- List of Spanish films of 2003
