= 13th Actors and Actresses Union Awards =

2004 Spanish award ceremony

- Date: 11 May 2004
- Site: Hotel Auditorium, Madrid, Spain
- Hosted by: Yum Barrera, Rosario Pardo, Mariola Fuentes
- Organized by: Actors and Actresses Union

Highlights
- Honorary career award: Juan José Otegui

The 13th Actors and Actresses Union Awards ceremony was held on 11 May 2004 at Madrid's Hotel Auditorium. Written by Luis Iborra and Antonio Albert, it was hosted by Yum Barrera, Rosario Pardo and Mariola Fuentes.

In addition to the competitive awards, Juan José Otegui obtained the 'Toda una vida' life achievement career award, whilst the Special Award went to the magazines Primer Acto and ADE Teatro.

== Winners and nominees ==
The winners and nominees are listed as follows:

=== Film ===
Best Male Performance in a Leading Role: Luis Tosar — Take My Eyes; Ernesto Alterio — Football Days; Óscar Jaenada — Noviembre	Best Female Performance in a Leading Role: Laia Marull — Take My Eyes; Adriana Ozores — Sleeping Luck; Candela Peña — Torremolinos 73
Best Male Performance in a Secondary Role: Eduard Fernández — In the City; Joan Dalmau — Soldiers of Salamina; Fernando Tejero — Football Days	Best Female Performance in a Secondary Role: Candela Peña — Take My Eyes; María Botto — Soldiers of Salamina; María Pujalte — In the City
Best Male Performance in a Minor Role: Secun de la Rosa — Football Days; Miguel Foronda — The 4th Floor; Rubén Ochandiano — The Weakness of the Bolshevik	Best Female Performance in a Minor Role: Leonor Watling — My Life Without Me; Berta Ojea — Mortadelo & Filemon: The Big Adventure; Nathalie Poza — Football Days

=== Television ===
Best Male Performance in a Leading Role: Fernando Tejero — Aquí no hay quien viva; Imanol Arias — Cuéntame cómo pasó; Antonio Resines — Los Serrano	Best Female Performance in a Leading Role: Amparo Baró — 7 vidas; Ana Duato — Cuéntame cómo pasó; Loles León — Aquí no hay quien viva
Best Male Performance in a Secondary Role: Luis Merlo — Aquí no hay quien viva; Jesús Bonilla — Los Serrano; Antonio Molero — Los Serrano	Best Female Performance in a Secondary Role: Malena Alterio — Aquí no hay quien viva; Mariví Bilbao — Aquí no hay quien viva; María Galiana — Cuéntame cómo pasó
Best Male Performance in a Minor Role: Tony Leblanc — Cuéntame cómo pasó; Manolo Caro — Los Serrano; Mario Martín — Un paso adelante	Best Female Performance in a Minor Role: Alicia Hermida — Cuéntame cómo pasó; Isabel Gaudí — Ana y los 7; Lluvia Rojo — Cuéntame cómo pasó

=== Theatre ===
Best Male Performance in a Leading Role: Miguel Ángel Solá — Hoy: el diario de Adán y Eva; Adolfo Fernández — Vida y muerte de Pier Paolo Passolini; Carlos Hipólito — El burlador de Sevilla	Best Female Performance in a Leading Role: Gloria Muñoz — Bicycles Are for the Summer; Elisa Matilla — El burlador de Sevilla; Pepa Pedroche — La celosa de sí misma
Best Male Performance in a Secondary Role: Fernando San Segundo — El burlador de Sevilla; Israel Elejalde — El burlador de Sevilla; Israel Frías — A Midsummer Night's Dream	Best Female Performance in a Secondary Role: Blanca Portillo — Como en las mejores familias; Manuela Paso Rodríguez — El burlador de Sevilla; Isabel Pintor — A Midsummer Night's Dream
Best Male Performance in a Minor Role: David Lorente — Bicycles Are for the Summer; José Luis Martínez — El burlador de Sevilla; Óscar Ortiz de Zarate — A Midsummer Night's Dream	Best Female Performance in a Minor Role: Bárbara Goenaga — Historia de una escalera; Mercedes Castro — Noche de reyes; Palmira Ferrer — A Midsummer Night's Dream

=== Newcomers ===
Best New Actor: Asier Etxeandía — Cabaret; Óscar Jaenada — Noviembre; Fernando Tejero — Football Days	Best New Actress: Nathalie Poza — Football Days; Verónica Sánchez — South from Granada; María Valverde — The Weakness of the Bolshevik
