= 18th Goya Awards =

- Date: 31 January 2004
- Site: Palacio Municipal de Congresos, Madrid
- Hosted by: Cayetana Guillén Cuervo and Diego Luna

Highlights
- Best Film: Take My Eyes
- Best Actor: Luis Tosar; Take My Eyes
- Best Actress: Laia Marull; Take My Eyes
- Most awards: Take My Eyes (7)
- Most nominations: Take My Eyes (9)

Television coverage
- Network: TVE

The 18th Goya Awards ceremony, presented by the Academy of Cinematographic Arts and Sciences of Spain, took place at the Palacio Municipal de Congresos in Madrid on 31 January 2004. The gala was hosted by Cayetana Guillén Cuervo and Diego Luna.

Take My Eyes (Te doy mis ojos) won 7 Goyas, the most awards in the ceremony, including those for Best Film, Director, Actor (Tosar), Actress (Marull) and Supporting Actress (Peña).

== Winners and nominees ==
The winners and nominees are listed as follows:

Best Film: Take My Eyes; My Life Without Me; The 4th Floor; Soldiers of Salamina	Best Director: Icíar Bollaín – Take My Eyes; Isabel Coixet – My Life Without Me; Cesc Gay – In the City; David Trueba – Soldiers of Salamina
Best Actor: Luis Tosar – Take My Eyes; Ernesto Alterio – Football Days; Javier Cámara – Torremolinos 73; Alfredo Landa – The End of a Mystery	Best Actress: Laia Marull – Take My Eyes; Ariadna Gil – Soldiers of Salamina; Adriana Ozores – Sleeping Luck; Sarah Polley – My Life Without Me
Best Supporting Actor: Eduard Fernández – In the City; Joan Dalmau – Soldiers of Salamina; Juan Diego – Torremolinos 73; José Luis Gómez – The End of a Mystery	Best Supporting Actress: Candela Peña – Take My Eyes; Mónica López – In the City; María Botto – Soldiers of Salamina; María Pujalte – The Carpenter's Pencil
Best Original Screenplay: Icíar Bollaín, Alicia Luna – Take My Eyes; Jaime Rosales, Enric Rufas– The Hours of the Day; Tomás Aragay, Cesc Gay – In the City; Pablo Berger – Torremolinos 73	Best Adapted Screenplay: Isabel Coixet – My Life Without Me; David Trueba – Soldiers of Salamina; Manuel Martín Cuenca, Lorenzo Silva – The Weakness of the Bolshevik; Fernando Marías – The End of a Mystery
Best New Actor: Fernando Tejero – Football Days; Juan Sanz – Life Marks; Víctor Clavijo – Silvia's Gift; Óscar Jaenada – November	Best New Actress: María Valverde – The Weakness of the Bolshevik; Elisabet Gelabert – Take My Eyes; Verónica Sánchez – South from Granada; Nathalie Poza – Football Days
Best Spanish Language Foreign Film: Intimate Stories • Argentina; El misterio del Trinidad • Mexico; Suite Habana • Cuba; Seawards Journey • Uruguay	Best European Film: Good Bye Lenin! • Germany; Dogville • Denmark; The Dreamers • UK/France/Italy; The Flower of Evil • France
Best New Director: Ángeles González Sinde – Sleeping Luck; David Serrano – Football Days; Pablo Berger – Torremolinos 73; Jaime Rosales – The Hours of the Day	Best Animated Film: El Cid: The Legend; The 3 Wise Men; El embrujo del sur; Glup
Best Cinematography: Javier Aguirresarobe – Soldiers of Salamina; Paco Femenia – Carmen; Alfredo F. Mayo – The Galíndez File; José Luis Alcaine – South from Granada	Best Editing: Iván Aledo – Mortadelo & Filemon: The Big Adventure; Ángel Hernández Zoido – Take My Eyes; Teresa Font – Carmen; Rosario Sáinz de Rozas – Football Days
Best Art Direction: César Macarrón – Mortadelo & Filemon: The Big Adventure; Benjamín Fernández – Carmen; Juan Pedro de Gaspar – The Carpenter's Pencil; Félix Murcia – The End of a Mystery	Best Production Supervision: Luis Manso, Marina Ortiz – Mortadelo & Filemon: The Big Adventure; Pilar Robla – South from Granada; Ana Vila –Carmen; Josean Gómez – The Galíndez File
Best Sound: Eva Valiño, Alfonso Pino, Pelayo Gutiérrez – Take My Eyes; Licio Marcos de Oliveira, Alfonso Pino, Nacho Royo – Life Marks; Silvio Darrin, Carlos Garrido, Alicia Saavedra – The Forest; Agustín Peinado, Carlos Garrido, Iván Mayoral – More Than a Thousand Cameras Are Working for Your Safety –	Best Special Effects: Felix Bergés, Raúl Romanillos, Pau Costa, Julio Navarro – Mortadelo & Filemon: The Big Adventure; Reyes Abades, Alfonso Nieto, Pablo Nuñez – South from Granada; Reyes Abades, Jesús Pascual, José Rossi, José María Remacha – El refugio del mal; Pedro Moreno, Alfonso Nieto, Emilio Ruiz del Río – Soldiers of Salamina
Best Costume Design: Yvonne Blake – Carmen; Tatiana Hernández – Mortadelo & Filemon: The Big Adventure; Lourdes de Orduña, Montse Sancho – Danube Hotel; Nereida Bonmatí – November	Best Makeup and Hairstyles: José Antonio Sánchez, Paquita Núñez – Mortadelo & Filemon: The Big Adventure; Miguel Sese, Natalia Sese – Carmen; Karmele Soler, Francisco Rodríguez – November; Cristóbal Criado, Alicia López – Danube Hotel
Best Original Score: Juan Bardem – South from Granada; Pablo Cervantes – Danube Hotel; Santi Vega – Eyengui, el dios del sueño; Juan Carlos Cuello – Valentín	Best Original Song: "Humans Like You" by Chop Suey – My Life Without Me; "Cuando me maten" by José Nieto – Carmen; "Atraco a tu corazón" by Paco Ortega – Atraco a las 3... y media; "Just Sorcery" by Mario de Benito, Richelieu Morris – The Witch Affair
Best Fictional Short Film: Sueños; Carisma; En camas separadas; Expres; Promoción (prohibida su venta)	Best Animated Short Film: Regaré con lágrimas tus pétalos; A... Mantis religiosa; El desván; La habitación inclinada; Manipai
Best Documentary: Un instante en la vida ajena; The Basque Ball: Skin Against Stone; Seville, Southside; Suite Habana	Best Documentary Short Film: Los niños del Nepal; Lección de cine; Yo soy de mi barrio

== Honorary Goya ==
- Héctor Alterio
