= Juan Carlos Aduviri =

Bolivian actor

- Born: 1 February 1976 (age 50); El Alto, Bolivia
- Occupations: Actor, Professor

Juan Carlos Aduviri (born 1 February 1976 in El Alto, Bolivia) is a Bolivian actor and professor of Bolivian cinematography. Aduviri gained fame for his main role in Even the Rain, which was directed by Icíar Bollaín and filmed in Bolivia. For his performance in the film, he was nominated for the Goya Award for Best New Actor.

His other films include the British short film, Salar (2011) and Refugiados (2013). In 2013, Aduviri was one of the main characters in the Argentinian movie "Bolishopping," which tells the story of a Bolivian worker and his exploitation by an Argentinian clothing factory manager.

== Background ==
Aduviri is the sixth child of seven brothers. He went to high school in the city of El Alto. He studied cinematography in the Municipal School of Arts of El Alto, where he became a professor. He received a best actor award at the Les Arcs Film Festival of France. He also won the award for Best Actor at the Polish Grand Off World Independent Film Awards for his role in Salar in 2011.
