= Paella Today! =

- Directed by: César Sabater
- Written by: César Sabater; Juanjo Moscardó Rius
- Produced by: César Castellote; Luis Piquer; César Sabater; José Vives
- Starring: Pablo Rivero; Olga Alamán; Alberto Jo Lee; Emilio Mencheta; Lolita Flores; Brays Efe; Mamen García; David Amor
- Cinematography: Gabriel Guerra
- Edited by: Mario Ortiz
- Distributed by: Alfa Pictures
- Release dates: October 27, 2017 (Abycine Film Festival); March 23, 2018 (Spain)
- Running time: 84 minutes
- Country: Spain
- Languages: Spanish; Valencian

Paella Today! is a 2017 Spanish comedy film by César Sabater.

== Plot ==
Two friends, Pep and Vicent, live in a wide flat in Valencia. Both Pep, an artist, and Vicent, a tourist guide, meet Lola, an old acquaintance of Pep's, with whom both become infatuated. After Lola has sex with both of them separately, they decide to have a threesome, which generates a conflict among all three and causes Pep and Vicent to fall out.

== Cast ==
- Pablo Rivero as Pep
- Olga Alamán as Lola
- Pau Gregori as Vicent
- Alberto Jo Lee as Jimmy
- Emilio Mencheta as Socarrat
- Lolita Flores as Dolores
- Brays Efe as Son
- Mamen García as Mother

== Reception ==
The movie was panned by critics. Critic Mikel Zorrilla stated that it is "a very bad movie in which none of its subplots actually work" and "an overdose of tasteless clichés".
