= Samana Sunrise =

- Theatrical release poster
- Spanish: Amanece en Samaná
- Directed by: Rafa Cortés
- Screenplay by: Rafa Cortés; Marta Sánchez; Javier Canales Sepúlveda; Emilio Tomé; Belén López Albert
- Based on: Cancún by Jordi Galcerán
- Starring: Luis Tosar; Luisa Mayol; Luis Zahera; Bárbara Santa-Cruz; Alfredo Castro; Charles Dance
- Production companies: Ron Vino y Miel AIE; A name like this; Materia Cinema; Quexito Films; Federation Spain
- Distributed by: Universal Pictures
- Release date: 8 November 2024 (Spain)
- Countries: Spain; Dominican Republic
- Language: Spanish

Samana Sunrise (Spanish: Amanece en Samaná) is a 2024 Spanish-Dominican comedy film directed by Rafa Cortés based on the play Cancún by Jordi Galcerán. It stars Luis Tosar, Luisa Mayol, Luis Zahera, and Bárbara Santa-Cruz.

== Plot ==
As two couples of friends respectively formed by Ale and Santi and Natalia and Mario make a trip to Samaná together, confessions about the past upends their holidays.

== Cast ==
- Luisa Mayol as Ale
- Luis Tosar as Santi
- Bárbara Santa-Cruz as Natalia
- Luis Zahera as Mario
- Charles Dance
- Alfredo Castro
- Félix Tejeda
- Andresito Germosen
- Lidia Ariza
- Laura Díaz
- Yaritza Reyes

== Production ==
Amanece en Samaná is an adaptation of the play Cancún by Jordi Galcerán. The film is a Ron Vino y Miel AIE Spanish-Dominican co-production with A name like this, Materia Cinema, Quexito Films, and Federation Spain, with the participation of Movistar Plus+. It was fully shot in the Dominican Republic.

== Release ==
Distributed by Universal Pictures, the film is set to be released theatrically in Spain on 8 November 2024.

== Reception ==
Andrés Salas of Cinemanía rated the film 3 out of 5 stars, declaring it "a basic but likeable comedy".

== See also ==
- List of Spanish films of 2024
