= Soldiers of Salamina (film) =

2003 film

- Theatrical release poster
- Spanish: Soldados de Salamina
- Directed by: David Trueba
- Screenplay by: David Trueba
- Based on: Soldiers of Salamis by Javier Cercas
- Produced by: Andrés Vicente Gómez; Cristina Huete
- Starring: Ariadna Gil; Ramón Fontserè; Joan Dalmau; María Botto; Diego Luna
- Cinematography: Javier Aguirresarobe
- Edited by: David Trueba
- Production companies: Lolafilms; Fernando Trueba PC
- Distributed by: United International Pictures
- Release date: 21 March 2003
- Running time: 119 minutes
- Country: Spain
- Languages: Spanish; Catalan; French

Soldiers of Salamina (Spanish: Soldados de Salamina) is a 2003 Spanish drama film written, directed and edited by David Trueba, based on the novel Soldiers of Salamis by Javier Cercas. It stars Ariadna Gil and Ramón Fontserè alongside Joan Dalmau, María Botto and Diego Luna. The film was nominated for eight Goya Awards in 2004, and won the award for Best Cinematography. It was selected as the Spanish entry for the Best Foreign Language Film at the 76th Academy Awards, but it was not nominated.

== Plot ==
Lola, a novelist who has abandoned her writing career, tracks down the details of a true story from the last days of the Spanish Civil War. The writer and Falangist honcho Rafael Sánchez Mazas faced a firing squad along with fifty other prisoners, but managed to escape into the woods. A Republican soldier, apparently one of those searching the area for the escaped prisoner, found him but allowed him to escape. The novelist pieces together the fragments of the story, plagued by contradictions and mysterious characters, and comes to realize that her search for the truth is a personal quest of self-discovery.

== Cast ==
- Ariadna Gil as Lola Cercas
- Ramon Fontserè as Rafael Sánchez Mazas
- Joan Dalmau as Miralles
- María Botto as Conchi
- Diego Luna as Gastón Elquiza
- Alberto Ferreiro as Joven miliciano
- Luis Cuenca as Padre de Lola
- Lluís X. Villanueva as Miquel Aguirre
- Julio Manrique as Pere Figueras
- Ivan Massagué as Quim Figueras (20 años)
- Bruno Bergonzini as Daniel Angelats (20 años)
- Joaquín Notario as Capitán Collell
- Merche Mar as Luz
- Eric Caravaca as Camarero Dijon
- Vahina Giocante as Assistante Social Dijon

== Production ==
An adaptation of the 2001 novel Soldiers of Salamis by Javier Cercas, the screenplay was penned by Trueba. In the transfer from novel to film, the character of Javier Cercas becomes Lola Cercas (changing the gender of the lead character) and Chilean writer Roberto Bolaño is replaced by Gastón Elquiza, a Mexican university student with a family background of exiles of the Spanish civil war. The film is a Lolafilms and Fernando Trueba PC production. Shooting locations included Girona, Catalonia.

== Release ==
Distributed by Lolafilms, the film was theatrically released in Spain on 21 March 2003. It was also screened in the Un Certain Regard section at the 56th Cannes Film Festival in May 2003.

== Accolades ==
Year	Award	Category	Nominee(s)	Result	Ref.
2004	18th Goya Awards	Best Film		Nominated	
2004	18th Goya Awards	Best Director	David Trueba	Nominated	
2004	18th Goya Awards	Best Adapted Screenplay	David Trueba	Nominated	
2004	18th Goya Awards	Best Actress	Ariadna Gil	Nominated	
2004	18th Goya Awards	Best Supporting Actress	María Botto	Nominated	
2004	18th Goya Awards	Best Supporting Actor	Joan Dalmau	Nominated	
2004	18th Goya Awards	Best Cinematography	Javier Aguirresarobe	Won	
2004	18th Goya Awards	Best Special Effects	Pedro Moreno, Alfonso Nieto, Emilio Ruiz del Río	Nominated	
2004	13th Actors and Actresses Union Awards	Best Film Actress in a Secondary Role	María Botto	Nominated	
2004	13th Actors and Actresses Union Awards	Best Film Actor in a Secondary Role	Joan Dalmau	Nominated	

== See also ==
- List of Spanish films of 2003
- List of submissions to the 76th Academy Awards for Best Foreign Language Film
- List of Spanish submissions for the Academy Award for Best Foreign Language Film
