= Soldiers of Salamis =

2001 novel by Javier Cercas

- First edition
- Author: Javier Cercas
- Original title: Soldados de Salamina
- Translator: Anne McLean
- Language: Spanish
- Set in: Spain
- Publisher: Tusquets (Spain), Bloomsbury Publishing (US)
- Publication date: 2001
- Publication place: Spain
- English publication date: 2003
- Media type: Print
- Pages: 209 pp
- Awards: Independent Foreign Fiction Prize for 2004
- ISBN: 978-8-4831-0161-2
- OCLC: 46658419
- Dewey Decimal: 863.64
- LC Class: PQ6653.E62

Soldiers of Salamis (Spanish: Soldados de Salamina) is a novel about the Spanish Civil War published in 2001 by Spanish author Javier Cercas. It is composed in a mixture of fact and fiction, which is something of a speciality of the author.

The book was acclaimed by critics in Spain and was top of the best-seller book list there for many months. A film adaptation Soldados de Salamina was released in 2003. The English translation by Anne McLean won the Independent Foreign Fiction Prize for 2004.

== Book ==
The book's title is a metaphorical allusion to the famous Battle of Salamis in which a joint Greek fleet defeated the Persians. The book raises questions about the relevance of historical events.

Soldiers of Salamis has sometimes been viewed in the context of a national debate in the first decade of the twenty-first century about how the Spanish Civil War should be commemorated. The year 2000 saw the foundation of the Association for the Recovery of Historical Memory which grew out of the quest by a sociologist, Emilio Silva-Barrera, to locate and identify the remains of his grandfather, who was shot by Nationalist forces in 1936. Cercas has said that many Spanish people of his generation have been reluctant to write about the Civil War (which was experienced directly by their grandparents' generation). He considers his novel to be a sort of exhumation (an analogy he makes in a 2015 epilogue). However, he has criticised the use of the term historical memory.

== Plot ==
The novel is divided into three sections. The first and third section depict the historical investigation of a fictional Javier Cercas into the life of the falangist Rafael Sánchez Mazas. The second section is a biographical retelling of Mazas's life.

In the first section of the novel, a fictionalized version of the author, also called Javier Cercas and a journalist, interviews the son of Mazas. During the interview Cercas is told the story of how Mazas escapes from execution by the Republicans at the end of the Spanish Civil War with the help of a lone soldier. Encouraged by his eccentric girlfriend, a TV fortune teller, Javier begins investigating the incident. Early on, he writes a brief article in his newspaper based on the retelling by Mazas's son. In response to this Cercas becomes obsessed with finding the soldier who spared the life of Mazas.

The second section of the novel takes place during the war itself (1936–1939). The nucleus of this section of the book is Rafael Sánchez Mazas's life. Cercas presents him as a writer and idealist of the Falange Española and close collaborator of José Antonio Primo de Rivera. The narrative in this section focuses on the particulars of his escape from execution at the end of the Spanish Civil War. When a group of prisoners is taken to the forest to be executed, Mazas is able to flee and hide in the bush. A Republican soldier finds him but decides to spare his life and when asked by another soldier if anyone is there he replies that no one is. Helped by several deserters, Mazas evades the retreating Republican forces and eventually returns to Nationalist custody where he became an important propagandist for Francoist Spain.

In the third section in the novel, after having written the biography in the second section, the Cercas character is still curious about the story of Mazas's escape. Following a series of leads, Cercas comes in contact with an old man named Miralles. Miralles had fought for the Republicans in the civil war and later became a member of the French Foreign Legion responsible for heroic feats during the Second World War. Cercas discovers him sequestered in a retirement home in his old age. Cercas comes to believe that Miralles was the soldier who saved Mazas from execution. However, Miralles will neither confirm nor deny having been the soldier to save Mazas. The fictional Cercas ends the novel with a monologue questioning the historical explanation which he had investigated and the nature of heroes.

== Film ==
Soldiers of Salamina (Spanish: Soldados de Salamina) is a 2003 Spanish drama film written, directed and edited by David Trueba, based on the novel Soldiers of Salamis by Javier Cercas. It stars Ariadna Gil and Ramón Fontserè alongside Joan Dalmau, María Botto and Diego Luna. The film was nominated for eight Goya Awards in 2004, and won the award for Best Cinematography. It was selected as the Spanish entry for the Best Foreign Language Film at the 76th Academy Awards, but it was not nominated.
