= Salvador (TV series) =

- Promotional release poster
- Genre: Action drama
- Created by: Aitor Gabilondo
- Written by: Aitor Gabilondo; Joan Barbero; Anna Casado
- Directed by: Daniel Calparsoro
- Starring: Luis Tosar; Claudia Salas
- Country of origin: Spain
- Original language: Spanish
- No. of seasons: 1
- No. of episodes: 8

Production
- Cinematography: Tommie Ferreras
- Production company: Alea Media

Original release
- Network: Netflix
- Release: 6 February 2026

Salvador is a Spanish action drama television series created by Aitor Gabilondo and directed by Daniel Calparsoro. It stars Luis Tosar and Claudia Salas.

== Plot ==
The life of ambulance driver Salvador Aguirre upends after rescuing his daughter Milena from a pre-arranged brawl between football ultras and finding out that she belongs to White Souls, a neo-Nazi group championing racist, violent, and homophobic values.

== Cast ==
- Luis Tosar as Salvador Aguirre
- Claudia Salas as Julia
- Leonor Watling as Carla
- Patricia Vico as inspectora Martín
- Fariba Sheikhan as Marjane
- Candela Arestegui as Milena
- César Mateo as Nacho
- Alejandro Casaseca as Max
- Marcos Marini as Isra
- Richard Holmes as Mateo
- Lucas Ares as Tibu
- Guillermo Lasheras as Toni
- Andrés Gertrúdix as attorney Dorado

== Production ==
The 8-episode series is an Alea Media production. It was created by Aitor Gabilondo, who wrote it along with Joan Barbero and Anna Casado. It was shot in Madrid and the final episode in Alicante the Playa de los Saladares-Urbanova.

== Release ==
The series was released on Netflix on 6 February 2026.

== See also ==
- 2026 in Spanish television
