= Luisa Mayol =

Chilean actress (born 1981)

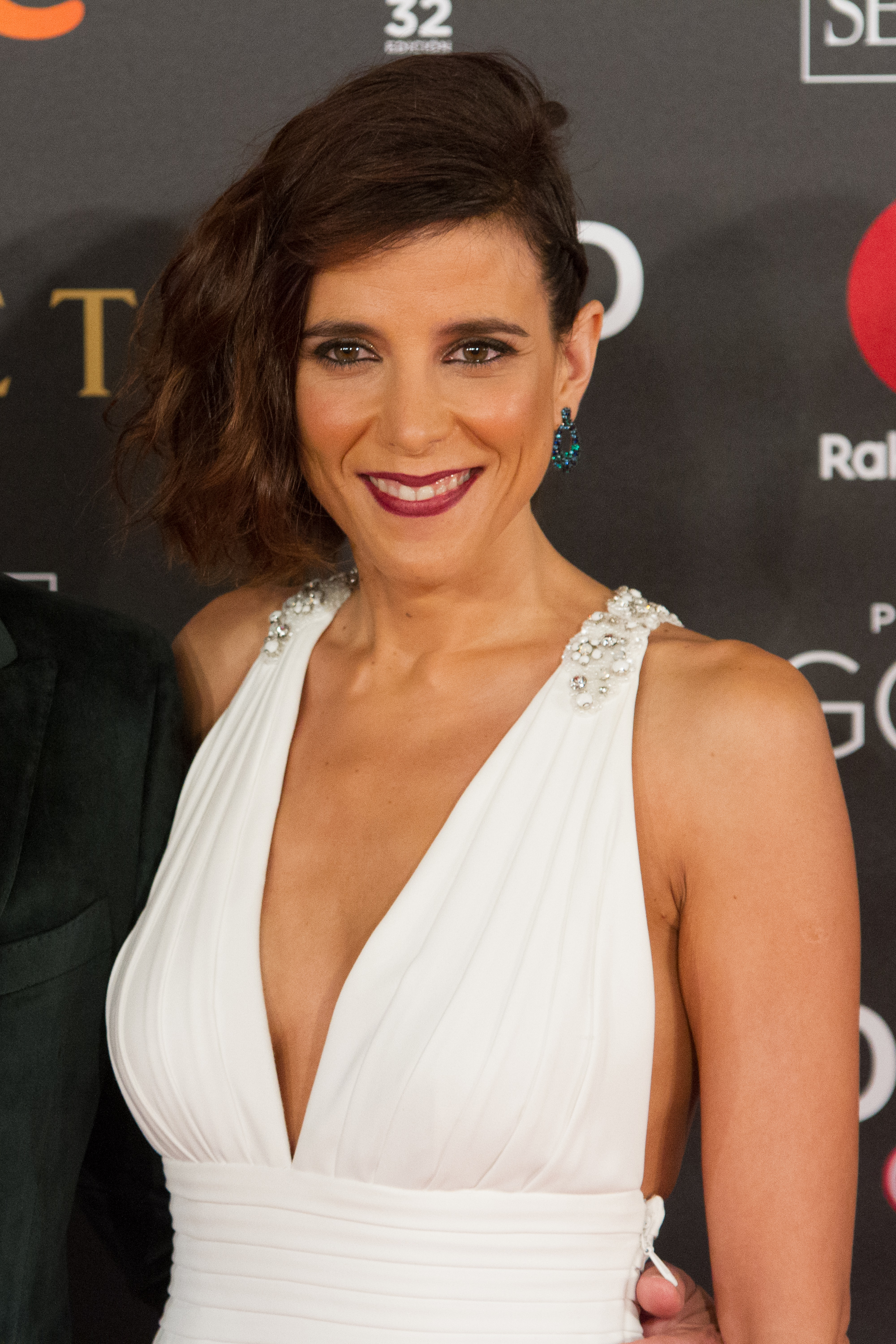
- At the 2018 Goya Awards
- Born: María Luisa Mayol Labbé; 20 February 1981; Santiago, Chile
- Other names: Malú
- Occupation(s): Actress, presenter
- Partners: Boris Quercia (2004–2014); Luis Tosar (2015–present)
- Children: 2

María Luisa Mayol Labbé (born 20 February 1981) is a Chilean actress living in Spain.

== Biography ==
María Luisa Mayol was born in Santiago on 20 February 1981. She trained at the Fernando González Acting Academy, and her first job was on Magi-K, a children's series on the channel Mega, which aired for two seasons in 2005 and 2006.

After making several special appearances, in 2011 she was part of the cast of Esperanza on TVN, the first Chilean telenovela in daytime hours.

In parallel, she began a career as a panelist for TV programs, first on the morning show Mujeres primero on La Red. A few months later, she rose to fame with her comic character Malú on the show Intrusos on the same channel.

Mayol was the presenter of Primer plano during the 2013 summer season. That was followed by an offer from TVN, where she cohosted Vitamina V with José Miguel Viñuela.

She resumed acting in 2014 with the role of Soledad in the nighttime telenovela No abras la puerta on TVN.

In 2015, Mayol moved to Spain and joined the third season of the Spanish series Gym Tony on Cuatro.

In 2018, she played the role of Irene in the Telecinco Cinema film Sara's Notebook, starring Belén Rueda.

In 2019, she appeared in Eye for an Eye by director Paco Plaza.

== Personal life ==
Mayol began a romantic relationship with actor Luis Tosar in 2015, and they have two children together.

== Filmography ==
=== Films ===
Key
†	Denotes film or TV productions that have not yet been released

Year	Title	Role	Director
2008	Santos	Police officer	Nicolás López
2010	Fuck My Life	Model	Nicolás López
2018	Sara's Notebook	Irene	Norberto López Amado
2019	Eye for an Eye	Ana	Paco Plaza
2021	Alegría	Esther	Violeta Salamana
2022	Fatum	Lidia	Juan Galiñanes
2024	Amanece en Samaná †	Ale	

=== Television series ===
Year	Title	Role	Channel
2005–2006	Magi-K	Matilde Farías	Mega
2007	Corazón de María		TVN
2007	Huaiquimán y Tolosa		Canal 13
2009	Nadie me entiende	Estíbaliz	Canal 13
2010	Los 80	Madre Paty	Canal 13
2011	Esperanza	Dolores "Luly" Fernández	TVN
2012	Infieles	Lucía	
2014	No abras la puerta	Soledad Vivanco	TVN
2015	Gym Tony	Sabina Kempes	Cuatro
2020	Relatos con-fin-a-dos	Angélica	Prime Video

=== Television programs ===
Year	Title	Role	Channel
2011	Mujeres primero	Fashion commentator	La Red
2011–2012	Intrusos	Malú	La Red
2012	Los profesionales	Panelist	La Red
2012	Pareja perfecta	Malú	Canal 13
2013	Primer plano	Host	Chilevisión
2013	Vive Viña en TVN	Panelist	TVN
2013	Juga2	Captain (replacement)	TVN
2013	Vitamina V	Cohost	TVN

=== Music videos ===
Year	Title	Artist	Director
2014	"Hey Hey Hey"	Los Tres	Boris Quercia
