= Pablo Rivero =

Spanish actor (born 1980)

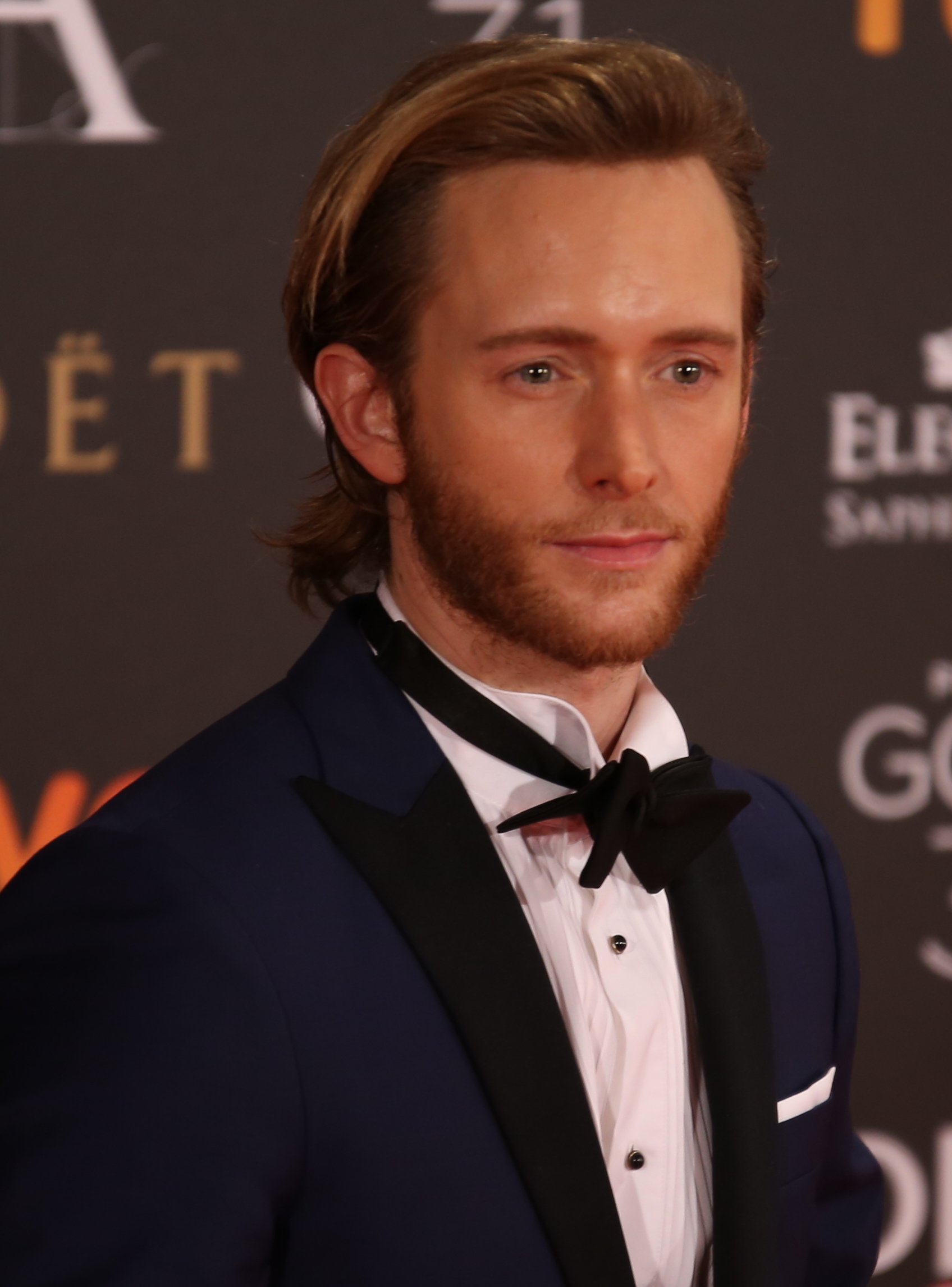
- Rivero at the 31st Goya Awards in 2017
- Born: Pablo José Rivero Rodrigo; 11 October 1980 (age 45); Madrid, Spain
- Occupations: Actor, writer

Pablo José Rivero Rodrigo (born 11 October 1980) is a Spanish actor and writer who became popular in Spain for his over twenty-year long performance as Toni Alcántara in the television prime-time series Cuéntame cómo pasó. As of 2024, he has published six novels.

== Works ==
=== Novels ===
- No volveré a tener miedo (2017)
- Penitencia (2020)
- Las niñas que soñaban con ser vistas (2021)
- La cría (2022)
- Dulce hogar (2023)
- La matriarca (2024)

== Filmography ==
=== Film ===
Year	Title	Role	Ref
2005	The Night of the Brother	Álex	
2010	Three Steps Above Heaven	Gustavo	
2011	Chrysalis	Manuel	
2017	Paella Today!	Pep	

=== Television ===
Year	Title	Role	Notes	Ref
2001–2023	Cuéntame cómo pasó	Toni Alcántara		
2021	Celebrity Bake Off	Himself	Contestant: Winner	
2023	El pueblo	Raúl Ardiles	3 episodes	
