= The Red Fish =

Red Fish
- Spanish film poster
- Directed by: José Antonio Nieves Conde
- Written by: Carlos Blanco
- Starring: Arturo de Córdova; Emma Penella
- Cinematography: Francisco Sempere
- Edited by: Margarita de Ochoa
- Music by: Miguel Asins Arbó
- Distributed by: Suevia Films
- Release date: 12 September 1955
- Running time: 100 minutes
- Country: Spain
- Language: Spanish

Red Fish (Spanish: Los peces rojos) is a 1955 Spanish thriller film directed by José Antonio Nieves Conde and written by Carlos Blanco with original idea by Carlos Blanco.

== Plot ==
Ivón, a chorus girl, and Hugo, a failed writer, turn up at a provincial hotel on a stormy night. They have come from Madrid with Carlos, Hugo's son, born nineteen years earlier after a casual affair. They decide to lean over the cliffs to look at the angry waves down below – and Carlos falls to his death.

== Bibliography ==
- Mira, Alberto. Historical Dictionary of Spanish Cinema. Scarecrow Press, 2010.
