= The Law of the Sea (TV series) =

Spanish television series

- Spanish: La ley del mar
- Created by: Flipy; Victoria Pedreira; Tatiana Rodríguez; David Troncoso
- Written by: Tatiana Rodríguez; Víctor Pedreira
- Directed by: Alberto Ruiz Rojo
- Starring: Blanca Portillo; Luis Tosar; Sonia Almarcha; Víctor Clavijo; Alfonso Lara; Àlex Monner; Ramón Ródenas; Carlos Serrano; Lamine Thior; Eva Marciel; Pau Durà
- Original languages: Spanish; Valencian
- No. of seasons: 1
- No. of episodes: 3

Production
- Executive producers: Flipy; Rafa Parbus
- Production companies: Studio60; MCFLY Prod AIE; RTVE; À Punt Mèdia

Original release
- Network: À Punt
- Release: 15 January – 16 January 2024
- Network: La 1
- Release: 21 January 2024

The Law of the Sea (Spanish: La ley del mar) is a Spanish adventure drama television miniseries created by Flipy, Victoria Pedreira, Tatiana Rodríguez, and David Troncoso. It stars Blanca Portillo and Luis Tosar.

== Plot ==
The plot tells the story of a small fishing boat from Santa Pola (the "Francisco y Catalina") who rescued a group of 51 African migrants in international waters close to Malta in 2006 under the purview of the law of the sea disobeying European authorities and were forced to wait for nine days for a decision.

== Cast ==
- Luis Tosar as José Durá "Pepe"
- Blanca Portillo as Andrea de Velasco Lorente
- Sonia Almarcha as Pepi
- Víctor Clavijo as Vicent
- Àlex Monner as Miquel
- Lamine Thior as Barack
- Carlos Serrano as Lolo
- Alfonso Lara as Paco
- Ramón Ródenas as Rober
- Teresa Hurtado
- Eva Marciel
- Paula Muñoz
- Pau Durà

== Production ==
The series is a Studio60 and MCFLY Prod AIE production for Radiotelevisión Española and À Punt Mèdia. It was shot on location in Madrid, Alicante, and Santa Pola, and at the Ciudad de la Luz film studios.

== Release ==
The series was presented at the Cádiz-based South International Series Festival in October 2023. The two first episodes premiered on À Punt on 15 January 2024 while the finale aired on 16 January 2024. La 1 aired the full series on 21 January 2024.

== Accolades ==
| Year | Award | Category | Nominee(s) | Result | Ref. |
|---|---|---|---|---|---|
| 2025 | 26th Iris Awards | Best Actor | Luis Tosar | Nominated | |

== See also ==
- 2024 in Spanish television
