= Atilano for President =

- Theatrical release poster
- Spanish: Atilano, presidente
- Directed by: La Cuadrilla
- Screenplay by: La Cuadrilla
- Produced by: José María Lara
- Starring: Manuel Manquiña; Ramón Barea; Laura Conejero; Fernando Vivanco; Carlos Lucas; Luis Tosar; Luis Prendes; Saturnino García
- Cinematography: Flavio Mtnez. Labiano
- Edited by: Cristina Otero
- Music by: Alexandre Desplat
- Production companies: Shangri-La PC; DMVB Films; Fabrica de Imagens
- Distributed by: Cine Company
- Release date: 25 September 1998 (Spain)
- Countries: Spain; France; Portugal
- Language: Spanish

Atilano for President (Spanish: Atilano, presidente) is a 1998 black comedy film directed and written by La Cuadrilla (Santiago Aguilar and Luis Guridi) which stars Manuel Manquiña alongside Ramón Barea and Laura Conejero.

== Plot ==
A group of bankers find low-key funeral worker and conman Atilano an apt prospect for becoming President of the Government, so the interests of the Church and Big Business be safeguarded.

== Cast ==
- Manuel Manquiña as Atilano
- Ramón Barea as Ortega
- Laura Conejero as Sol
- Fernando Vivanco as Antúnez
- Carlos Lucas as Marcelino
- Luis Tosar as Cazorla
- María Isbert as Eloísa
- Saturnino García as el Ahorcado
- Marta Fernández-Muro as moderadora TV
- Luis Prendes as don Aníbal

== Production ==
The film is a Shangri-La PC, DMVB Films, and Fabrica de Imagens Spanish-French-Portuguese co-production. It was shot in Madrid in 1998.

== Release ==
Distributed by Cine Company, the film was released theatrically in Spain on 25 September 1998.

== Reception ==
Jonathan Holland of Variety deemed the film to be a "an energetic, Berlanga-esque take on Spanish politics ’90s style".

== See also ==
- List of Spanish films of 1998
