= All the Names of God =

- Theatrical release poster
- Spanish: Todos los nombres de Dios
- Directed by: Daniel Calparsoro
- Written by: Gemma Ventura
- Starring: Luis Tosar; Inma Cuesta; Nourdin Batán; Patricia Vico; Lucas Nabor; Antonio Buil; Roberto Enríquez; Fernando Cayo
- Cinematography: Tommie Ferreras
- Edited by: Antonio Frutos
- Music by: Carlos Jean
- Production companies: Todos los Nombres de Dios AIE; Tripictures; Second Gen Pictures; Wanda Visión
- Distributed by: Tripictures
- Release date: 15 September 2023
- Country: Spain
- Language: Spanish
- Box office: €0.96 million

All the Names of God (Spanish: Todos los nombres de Dios) is a 2023 Spanish action thriller film directed by Daniel Calparsoro and written by Gemma Ventura which stars Luis Tosar alongside Inma Cuesta.

== Plot ==
In the wake of a terrorist attack, taxi driver Santiago Gómez Lasarte "Santi" is taken hostage by the surviving terrorist Hamza and subsequently becomes a walking human bomb in Gran Vía.

== Cast ==
- Luis Tosar as Santi
- Inma Cuesta as Pilar Montero
- Nourdin Batán as Hamza
- Patricia Vico
- Lucas Nabor
- Antonio Buil
- Roberto Enríquez as Gerardo
- Fernando Cayo

== Production ==
All the Names of God was written by Gemma Ventura. The film was produced by Todos los Nombres de Dios AIE alongside Tripictures, Second Gen Pictures and Wanda Visión, and it had the collaboration of Amazon Prime Video, and the participation of RTVE, Telemadrid, and Mogambo. Shooting locations included Gran Vía and the Ciudad Real Airport.

== Release ==
Distributed by Tripictures, the film was released theatrically in Spain on 15 September 2023.

== Reception ==
Sergio F. Pinilla of Cinemanía rated the film 4 out of 5 stars, deeming it to be "a frenetic action thriller".

Raquel Hernández Luján of HobbyConsolas rated the film with 65 points ('acceptable'), positively citing Tosar's performance, the bathroom scene, and the chemistry between senior and young cast members, while negatively citing script issues and the overly derivative Guardia Civil subplot.

== See also ==
- List of Spanish films of 2023
