= My Life Without Me =

- U.S. theatrical poster
- Directed by: Isabel Coixet
- Screenplay by: Isabel Coixet
- Based on: Pretending the Bed Is a Raft by Nanci Kincaid
- Produced by: Esther García; Gordon McLennan
- Starring: Sarah Polley; Amanda Plummer; Scott Speedman; Leonor Watling; Deborah Harry; Maria de Medeiros; Mark Ruffalo
- Cinematography: Jean-Claude Larrieu
- Edited by: Lisa Robison
- Music by: Alfonso Vilallonga
- Production companies: El Deseo; Milestone Entertainment
- Distributed by: Alliance Atlantis Releasing (Canada); Warner Sogefilms (Spain)
- Release date: December 17, 2003
- Running time: 106 minutes
- Countries: Canada; Spain
- Language: English
- Budget: $2.5 million
- Box office: $12.3 million

My Life Without Me is a 2003 Canadian drama film directed by Isabel Coixet and starring Sarah Polley, Mark Ruffalo, Scott Speedman, and Leonor Watling. Based on the 1997 short story collection Pretending the Bed Is a Raft by Nanci Kincaid, it tells a story of a 23-year-old woman, with a husband and two daughters, who finds out she is going to die soon. The film is an El Deseo and My Life Productions co-production.

== Plot ==
We first see Ann as she is experiencing the rain, mentally describing how it makes her feel.

Working a janitorial job, Ann's coworker Lori is envious that 23-year-old Ann keeps thin, while she has to always be careful. After work, Ann picks up her negative mother from her bakery job, who is critical of Ann's husband Don's unemployment.

After Don takes their two young daughters Patsy and Penny to school, Ann doubles over in pain. Her mother takes her to the hospital due to the collapse. The doctor diagnoses her with metastatic ovarian cancer and tells her she has only two months to live.

Reflecting upon her life, Ann marvels at how careful she has been to not drink or abuse her body but her life is still going to be cut short. Having gotten pregnant as a young teen, she has only ever known Don romantically. And she has not seen her jailed father for ten years.

After Ann sees her daughters off to school, as she has decided not to tell anyone of her condition, using the cover of anemia, Ann makes a list of things to do before she dies. She decides to change her hair, record birthday messages for the girls for every year until they are 18, find a replacement for the girls and Don and experience sex with another man, getting him to fall in love with her.

The next evening, Ann leaves a note saying she is going to the laundromat, but first tries going to a bar. Feeling out of place, she ends up at a 24-hour laundromat. There, she meets Lee. Falling asleep, he watches Ann as she sleeps and helps her by finishing her laundry for her.

Lee admits he had seen Ann in the café a few days ago. He loans her his coat, and when she gets home, she finds he has included his book with his phone number inside the laundry bag, thus giving her the opportunity to contact him.

At her janitorial job, during her break Ann records the messages for Patsy and Penny's future birthdays. Then, while working, as she vomits during her shift, her weight-obsessed coworker assumes she is ill from a radical diet.

After her shift Ann, longing to experience a life that was never available to her, she seeks out Lee. As he has no furniture, she supposes his last partner took it, but he has not replaced it as he hopes she will return. A surveyor, Lee has worked in many far-away places.

After Ann shows Lee photos of her girls, he says they are beautiful, like their mother. He then mentions that his sister regularly sends music compilation tapes, so he and Ann go out to his car to listen to one. They each find the other daring to kiss, which they do passionately.

At the hospital, Ann's doctor scolds her for not coming every week. Ann explains she is working on a bucket list, and hands him the box of cassettes she recorded for her daughters. He hands her a bag of the sweets she liked on her last visit, and gets her to promise to pop in for painkillers, even though she refuses more tests or other medication.

Hoping her friend and workmate Lori hits it off with her family, Ann invites her to dinner. Despite her hopes that it will go well, Penny calls her a pig. Later, as the couple lay in bed, Don talks about how grateful he is that they found each other although life has been hard.

In the morning, as the girls are playing in the yard they meet a new friendly neighbor, a young woman also called Ann. Leaving the girls with her, Ann takes advantage and goes to spend some time with Lee, who is out surveying.

On her return, Ann's namesake invites her over for coffee. She is a nurse, and when Ann asks her if she wants kids, she tells our protagonist a tragic story about siamese twins who shared too many organs to be separable at birth. She had offered to stay with them so they would not die alone, but the over 24 hour experience traumatized her so much, she switched to geriatric nursing.

Ann gets her mother to tell her where her dad is incarcerated. She visits him, shows him photos of the six and four year-olds, shares a positive memory she has of him, and he apologizes for not being present for them.

As she gets weaker, Ann insists her weakness is anemia. Then later she records her apologetic explanation to Don, she did not want them all to be seeing each other in the hospital as she lay dying.

Ann's experiment with Lee not only lets Ann experience how it feels to be in a sexual relationship with someone other than her husband, but also takes an emotional toll. Not only does he ends up madly in love with her so is left heartbroken when she breaks it off with him, but she also suffers from the pain. When Lee meets with her one last time, he says that he would do anything to make her happy, taking care of her daughters and even finding her husband a new job.

Although Ann ends their relationship and never tells him that she is dying, she prepares an explanatory tape. So, at the end of the film, Ann's leaves recorded messages to both Don and Lee both telling each she loves them. Her doctor then delivers them all after her death.

== Cast ==
- Sarah Polley as Ann
- Scott Speedman as Don, Ann's Husband
- Mark Ruffalo as Lee
- Deborah Harry as Ann's Mother
- Jessica Amlee as Penny, Ann's Daughter
- Kenya Jo Kennedy as Patsy, Ann's Daughter
- Amanda Plummer as Laurie, Ann's Friend
- Leonor Watling as Ann, The Neighbor
- Maria de Medeiros as The Hairdresser
- Julian Richings as Dr. Thompson
- Alfred Molina as Ann's Father

== Reception ==
=== Box office ===
The film was released on September 26, 2003 and ran for 12 weeks. It grossed $400,948 in the USA and $9,326,006 from markets in other countries, for a worldwide total of $9,726,954.

=== Critical response ===
My Life Without Me received generally positive reviews from film critics. Review aggregator Rotten Tomatoes reports a 65% approval rating, with an average rating of 6.32/10, based on 100 reviews. The site's consensus reads: "Sarah Polley keeps this production afloat with her moving performance". Metacritic, another review aggregator, gives the film an average score of 57/100 based on 31 critics, indicating "mixed or average reviews".

=== Accolades ===
The film won many international and festival awards, including the Genie Award for Best Actress (Polley), the Goya Award for Best Adapted Screenplay (Coixet), and Best Song ("Humans Like You" by Chop Suey).

Award	Date of ceremony	Category	Recipient(s)	Result	Ref(s)
European Film Awards	6 December 2003	Best Film	Isabel Coixet	Nominated	
European Film Awards	6 December 2003	Best Director	Isabel Coixet	Nominated	
Genie Awards	1 May 2004	Best Actress	Sarah Polley	Won	
Goya Awards	31 January 2004	Best Film	Isabel Coixet	Nominated	
Goya Awards	31 January 2004	Best Director	Isabel Coixet	Nominated	
Goya Awards	31 January 2004	Best Adapted Screenplay	Isabel Coixet	Won	
Goya Awards	31 January 2004	Best Actress	Sarah Polley	Nominated	
Goya Awards	31 January 2004	Best Original Song	Chop Suey	Won	
Vancouver Film Critics Circle	2003	Best Actress in a Canadian Film	Sarah Polley	Won	

== See also ==
- List of Spanish films of 2003
- List of Canadian films of 2003
