= Operation E =

2012 film

- Directed by: Miguel Courtois
- Starring: Luis Tosar; Martina García
- Release date: 1 July 2012
- Running time: 1h 49min
- Countries: France; Spain; Colombia
- Language: Spanish

Operation E (Spanish: Operación E) is a 2012 Spanish-French-Colombian drama film directed by Miguel Courtois.

The film was inspired by the story of José Crisanto, a Colombian peasant who was sentenced to 33 years in prison after nursing the son of Clara Rojas who was kidnapped by the FARC.
