= Patricia Vico =

Spanish actress (born 1972)

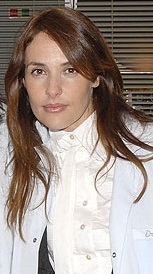
- Born: Patricia Vico González; 27 August 1972 (age 53); Madrid, Spain
- Occupation: Actress
- Years active: 1992–present
- Spouse: Daniel Calparsoro

Patricia Vico González (born 27 August 1972) is a Spanish actress. She gained early fame for her role as Fifa in comedy television series La casa de los líos (1996–2000). She also portrayed lesbian character Maca in Hospital Central from 2004 to 2011, henceforth becoming an LGBT icon.

== Life and career ==
Patricia Vico González was born in Madrid on 27 August 1972. She dropped out from studies on advertising to gain her acting skills under training of Argentine-born playwright, director and acting coach Cristina Rota.

From 2004 to 2011, Vico was a cast member on the medical drama series Hospital Central, portraying lesbian doctor Maca Fernández, in a relationship with nurse Esther García (Fátima Baeza).

She married filmmaker Daniel Calparsoro.

In 2015, she was a main character in the horror television series Rabia.

== Filmography ==
=== Television ===
- La noche de Hermida (1992) Antena 3
- Encantada de la vida (1993) Antena 3
- Los ladrones van a la oficina (1993) Antena 3
- Hermanos de leche (1994) Antena 3
- Sólo para inteligentes TVE
- Yo, una mujer (1996) Antena 3
- La casa de los líos (1996) Antena 3
- Paraíso (2000–2003) TVE
- Diez en Ibiza (2004) TVE
- 7 vidas (2000) Telecinco
- Esencia de poder (2001) Telecinco
- Hospital Central (2004–2010) Telecinco
- La Ira (2009)
- El Señor de los Cielos (2017) Telemundo
- Hasta el cielo (2023) as Mercedes

=== Film ===
Year	Title	Role	Notes	Ref.
1995	Dile a Laura que la quiero	Irene		
1996	Libertarias	Patro		
1996	Un asunto privado	Clienta ('customer')		
1997	Sabor latino	Marta		
2003	Pacto de brujas (Witchery Deal)	Luisa		
2004	El asombroso mundo de Borjamari y Pocholo (The Amazing World of Borjamari and Pocholo)			
2014	Perdona si te llamo amor (Sorry If I Call You Love)	Simona		
2016	Cien años de perdón (To Steal from a Thief)	Sandra		
2019	El crack cero	Remedios		
2020	Hasta el cielo (Sky High)	Mercedes		
2022	Centauro	Regina		
2023	Todos los nombres de Dios (All the Names of God)			
