= We Treat Women Too Well =

2024 Spanish-French black comedy film

- Film poster
- Spanish: Tratamos demasiado bien a las mujeres
- Directed by: Clara Bilbao
- Screenplay by: Miguel Barros
- Based on: On est toujours trop bon avec les femmes by Raymond Queneau
- Starring: Carmen Machi; Antonio de la Torre; Luis Tosar; Isak Férriz; Óscar Ladoire; Julián Villagrán; Diego Anido
- Cinematography: Imanol Nabea
- Edited by: Ascen Marchena
- Music by: Nacho Masttreta; Marina Sorín
- Production companies: Ficción Producciones; Noodles Production
- Distributed by: Filmax
- Release dates: 3 March 2024 (Málaga); 15 March 2024 (Spain)
- Countries: Spain; France
- Language: Spanish

We Treat Women Too Well (Spanish: Tratamos demasiado bien a las mujeres) is a 2024 Spanish-French black comedy film directed by Clara Bilbao (in her full-length directorial debut) from a screenplay by Miguel Barros based on the novel by Raymond Queneau. It stars Carmen Machi.

== Plot ==
Set in 1945, during the dictatorship that followed the Spanish Civil War, the plot follows the plight of stubborn Nationalist woman Remedios Buendía, determined not to let some Maquis guerrilla fighters spoil her day.

== Cast ==
- Carmen Machi as Remedios Buendía
- Antonio de la Torre as Doce
- Luis Tosar as Antonio
- Isak Férriz as Bocas
- Óscar Ladoire as Soria
- Julián Villagrán as Julian
- Diego Anido as Anton
- Gonzalo de Castro as Aguado
- Cris Iglesias as Aurora

== Production ==
The film is based on the novel On est toujours trop bon avec les femmes by Raymond Queneau. It is a Spanish-French co-production by Ficción Producciones alongside Noodles Production with backing from Xunta de Galicia, TVG, TVE, and Prime Video. It was lensed by Imanol Nabea, edited by Ascen Marchena and scored by Nacho Mastretta and Marina Sorín. Filming began in March 2023. Shooting locations in Galicia included the parish of San Simón da Costa, Vilalba.

== Release ==
The film was presented in the competitive slate of the 27th Málaga Film Festival's official selection on 3 March 2024. Distributed by Filmax, it is scheduled to be released theatrically in Spain on 15 March 2024.

== Reception ==
Jonathan Holland of ScreenDaily deemed the film to be an "intriguing if uneven mashup of dark comedy, anti-war satire, slasher horror, feminist fable and more" with "a delightfully deranged performance" delivered by Machi.

== See also ==
- List of French films of 2024
- List of Spanish films of 2024
