= Even the Rain =

2010 film directed by Icíar Bollaín

- Theatrical release poster
- Spanish: También la lluvia
- Directed by: Icíar Bollaín
- Written by: Paul Laverty
- Based on: 2000 Cochabamba protests
- Produced by: Juan Gordon; Pilar Benito; Eric Altmayer; Monica Lozano Serrano; Emma Lustres
- Starring: Luis Tosar; Gael García Bernal; Juan Carlos Aduviri; Karra Elejalde; Raúl Arévalo
- Cinematography: Alex Catalán
- Edited by: Ángel Hernández Zoido
- Music by: Alberto Iglesias
- Production companies: Morena Films; Alebrije Cine y Video; Mandarin Cinema
- Distributed by: Vitagraph Films
- Release dates: September 16, 2010 (TIFF); January 5, 2011 (France and Spain)
- Running time: 104 minutes
- Countries: Spain; Mexico; France
- Languages: Spanish; Quechua; English
- Box office: $5.8 million

Even the Rain (Spanish: También la lluvia) is a 2010 drama film directed by Icíar Bollaín and written by Paul Laverty. It is one of Icíar Bollaín's most ambitious films, internationally co-produced film by companies from Spain, Mexico and France. Shot in Bolivia, in the Chapare jungle, and in the city of Cochabamba, the film is a large production with more than 4,000 extras in total, with about 300 of the extras being indigenous people, as well as a team of 130 people and more than 70 locations, almost all of them outdoors.

The film received nominations and awards internationally, including an Ariel Award for Best Ibero-American Film and three Goya Awards. It was selected as the Spanish entry for the Best Foreign Language Oscar for the 83rd Academy Awards, making the January shortlist.

== Plot ==
Mexican filmmaker Sebastián and his Spanish executive producer Costa arrive in Cochabamba, Bolivia, accompanied by the cast and crew, to create a historical film depicting Christopher Columbus's first voyage to the New World, the imposition of Spanish authority over the natives of Hispaniola, and the subsequent indigenous rebellion by Hatuey. Cognizant of his limited budget, Costa decides to film in Bolivia, the poorest country in South America. Hundreds of Bolivian locals show up and wait in long lines in response to the open casting pamphlet. Costa is enthusiastic about saving thousands of dollars by having underpaid extras perform tasks on set meant to be done by experienced engineers.

Sebastián casts Daniel, a local man, in the role of Hatuey, the Taíno chief who led a rebellion against Columbus. Daniel's daughter Belén lands a crucial role as well. Their first encounter with Daniel is during the casting process. When casting directors start to turn people away in line, Daniel makes a scene and states that everyone should get a chance to audition, as the pamphlet advertised. This makes Costa oppose the hiring of Daniel, but Sebastián sees Daniel's fire and liveliness as perfect for the role. Sebastián is unaware that Daniel is leading demonstrations against the new government-protected water company during the water privatisation plan. Filming begins smoothly despite the alcoholism of Anton, the actor cast as Columbus, but when Costa observes Daniel's revolutionary involvement, he becomes increasingly uneasy about Sebastián's decision.

While filming, Costa starts speaking badly of the natives in English, not knowing that Daniel understands that language. Because of this, Daniel becomes more aware of how Costa and the rest of the crew are taking advantage of the natives. After seeing that Daniel understands that abuse, Costa becomes more cognizant of it himself and starts feeling guilty.

As the crew begins to wrap up the film, the exasperation of the natives intensifies. They begin to consider fighting for their rights to water by protesting in the streets. All these efforts are led by Daniel, who, despite being asked to lie low in exchange for a bigger pay, continues to protest. Costa reaches his breaking point with Daniel when the latter gets beaten by the police during the riots. He tries to bribe Daniel, offering him several thousand dollars to stay silent for a few weeks. Daniel accepts the money but uses it to fund the protesters and remains involved, eventually becoming imprisoned. Sebastián experiences moral conflict and begins to doubt the likelihood of the film's completion, but is reassured by Costa, who bribes the police for Daniel's temporary release to film a key scene, in which Colón and his conquistadors execute Hatuey and his rebels. Upon this scene's completion, the police arrive and detain Daniel again, but are besieged by the film's extras, who allow him to escape.

That night, actors Juan and Alberto see the news reports of violence in Cochabamba and become worried, demanding to leave. Sebastián begs them to stay, and they agree begrudgingly. The next day, as the cast and crew prepare to depart for filming, Costa is met by Daniel's wife, Teresa, who implores him to assist her in finding Belén, who has disappeared into the protests and is reportedly wounded and in need of hospitalization. Despite Costa trying to turn her down he is eventually won over by Teresa's persistence, and despite Sebastián's equally impassioned insistence against it, he leaves with her.

Riding through the streets of Cochabamba, Costa sees the damage done to the city, finally realizing the seriousness of their current situation.

After Costa and Teresa's obstacle-laden drive, Belén's life is saved, but her leg is badly injured and may never fully heal. Meanwhile, the rest of the crew is stopped by a military blockade, and all except Antón leave Sebastián to journey home. The revolution ends shortly thereafter with the departure of the multinational water company, but Cochabamba is left in ruins from the conflict. Costa expresses hope that the film will be finished after all, and Daniel emotionally presents him with a vial of Bolivian water in appreciation for saving his daughter.

== Cast ==
- Luis Tosar as Costa, executive producer in the movie
- Gael García Bernal as Sebastián, director in the movie
- Juan Carlos Aduviri as Daniel, Bolivian native cast as Hatuey
- Karra Elejalde as Antón, alcoholic Spanish actor cast as Colón
- Raúl Arévalo as Juan, Spanish actor cast as Montesinos
- Carlos Santos as Alberto, Spanish actor cast as Las Casas
- Cassandra Ciangherotti as María, assistant director to Sebastián
- Milena Soliz as Belén, Daniel's daughter cast as Panuca in the movie
- Leónidas Chiri as Teresa, Bolivian native and Daniel's wife
- Ezequiel Días as Bruno

== Release ==
On 16 September 2010, the film premiered at the Toronto International Film Festival. In October, it released in the United States (Los Angeles, California), Britain (London Film Festival), and Spain (Valladolid Film Festival). It made its French debut at the Les Arcs Film Festival in December 2010. It was screened in the Panorama section at the 61st Berlin International Film Festival, followed by the 2011 Sydney Film Festival. After special screenings in Cochabamba's Southern Zone and for the Bolivian press, it opened in Bolivia on twelve screens on March 17, 2011.

== Reception ==
=== Critical response ===
The film received generally positive reviews. Even the Rain has an approval rating of 88% on review aggregator website Rotten Tomatoes, based on 64 reviews, and an average rating of 7/10. Metacritic assigned the film a weighted average score of 69 out of 100, based on 20 critics, indicating "generally favourable reviews".

Roger Ebert admires the filmmakers' courage in choosing the Bolivian water crisis as subject matter, but notes potential hypocrisy, writing, "…at the end I looked in vain for a credit saying, 'No extras were underpaid in the making of this film.'" The New York Times writer Stephen Holden also raises this concern, asserting, "You can't help but wonder to what degree its makers exploited the extras recruited to play 16th-century Indians." Also, Holden addresses Costa's transformation, writing, "Mr. Tosar goes as far as he can to make the character's change of heart believable, but he can't accomplish the impossible." Contrarily, Marshall Fine of the Huffington Post views Tosar's efforts as praiseworthy, calling him "perfect as the producer: bull-headed, charming, conniving and wheedling when he needs to be – but a man with a vision, who ultimately gets his mind changed. Tosar makes his conflict not only credible but palpable." Praising the film overall, Ann Hornaday of The Washington Post calls Even the Rain "a story in which personal connections can transcend even the most crushing structures of history and politics."

=== Awards and nominations ===
Academy Award entry

The film was selected in September 2010 over Daniel Monzón's Cell 211 which also stars Luis Tosar, as the Spanish entry for the Best Foreign Language Film category at the 83rd Academy Awards. In January 2011, it landed a spot on the list of the top nine films in its category. However, it was not selected to be among the final five films nominated for the Oscar.

Ariel Awards

- Best Ibero-American Film

Berlin International Film Festival

- Panorama Audience Award, Fiction Film

Cinema Writers Circle Awards

Won

- Best Cinematography (Alex Catalán)
- Best Director (Icíar Bollaín)
- Best Film (Icíar Bollaín)
- Best Score (Alberto Iglesias)
- Best Original Screenplay (Paul Laverty)
- Best Supporting Actor (Karra Elejalde)

Nominated

- Best Actor (Luis Tosar)
- Best Editing (Ángel Hernández Zoido)

European Film Awards Nomination

- Audience Award, Best Film

Goya Awards

Won

- Best Original Score (Alberto Iglesias)
- Best Production Supervision (Cristina Zumárraga)
- Best Supporting Actor (Karra Elejalde)

Nominated

- Best Actor (Luis Tosar)
- Best Costume Design (Sonia Grande)
- Best Director (Icíar Bollaín)
- Best Editing (Ángel Hernández Zoido)
- Best Film (Juan Gordon)
- Best Make-Up and Hairstyles (Karmele Soler & Paco Rodríguez)
- Best New Actor (Juan Carlos Aduviri)
- Best Original Screenplay (Paul Laverty)
- Best Sound (Nacho Royo, Emilio Cortés, & Pelayo Gutiérrez)
- Best Special Effects (Gustavo Harry Farias & Juan Manuel Nogales)

Palm Springs International Film Festival

- Bridging the Borders Award

Latin ACE Awards

- Cinema – Best Director (Icíar Bollaín)
- Cinema – Best Film (Icíar Bollaín)
- Cinema – Best Supporting Actor (Gael García Bernal)

Spanish Music Awards

- Best Score (Alberto Iglesias)

== Historical context ==
The mayor and the Bolivian government were wrong to insist on an expensive and unnecessary dam. But the bigger problem was that [the state utility company] Semapa's water tariffs had been too low for too long, starving the system of investment. Had the tariffs been raised earlier, more cash would have been available to improve service. These twin failings meant that any new contract, public or private, was bound to lead to unacceptable price rises.

— The Economist

The restoration of civilian rule to Bolivia in 1982 ended decades of military dictatorships, but did not bring economic stability. In 1985, with hyperinflation at an annual rate of 25 thousand percent, few foreign investors would do business in the country. The Bolivian government turned to the World Bank as a last refuge against economic meltdown. For the next 20 years, successive governments followed the World Bank's provisions in order to qualify for continued loans from the organization. In order to move towards independent development, Bolivia privatised its railways, telephone system, national airlines, and hydrocarbon industry. In October 1999, the privatization of Cochabamba's municipal water supply followed, allowed by a new law and the investment of a new firm, Aguas del Tunari – a joint venture involving San Francisco-based Bechtel Corporation. The agreement involved the firm investing in a long-envisioned dam so they dramatically raised water rates.

Protests, largely organized through the Coordinadora in Defense of Water and Life, a community coalition, erupted in January, February, and April 2000, culminating in tens of thousands marching downtown and battling police in the 2000 Cochabamba protests. In April 2000, the national government reached an agreement with the Coordinadora to reverse the privatization. The wave of demonstrations and police violence was described as a public uprising against water prices.

== Fact and fiction ==
The film conveys messages against colonialism and is based on the 2000 Cochabamba Water War. Strikes and protests eventually led engineering company Bechtel to abandon the Bolivian market after its water contract was cancelled, and a new company was installed under public control. However, in 2005, half of the 855,000 people in Cochabamba were still without water and the rest only received intermittent service (some for as little as three hours a day).

== See also ==
- Cinema of Spain
- List of submissions to the 83rd Academy Awards for Best Foreign Language Film
- List of Spanish submissions for the Academy Award for Best Foreign Language Film
- Bolivian presidential election, 2005
- Water supply and sanitation in Bolivia
- The Corporation (2003), documentary that features the Cochabamba protests, directed by Mark Achbar and Jennifer Abbott
- Blue Gold: World Water Wars (2008) directed by Sam Bozzo
- Quantum of Solace (2008), a James Bond movie whose main theme is the water supply issue in Bolivia
