= The Weakness of the Bolshevik =

- Theatrical release poster
- Spanish: La flaqueza del bolchevique
- Directed by: Manuel Martín Cuenca
- Screenplay by: Lorenzo Silva; Manuel Martín Cuenca
- Based on: La flaqueza del bolchevique by Lorenzo Silva
- Starring: Luis Tosar; Mar Regueras; María Valverde; Nathalie Poza; Manolo Solo; Yolanda Serrano
- Cinematography: Alfonso Parra
- Edited by: Ángel Hernández Zoido
- Music by: Roque Baños
- Production company: Rioja Audiovisual
- Distributed by: United International Pictures
- Release date: 31 October 2003
- Running time: 95 minutes
- Country: Spain
- Language: Spanish
- Budget: $275,792

The Weakness of the Bolshevik (Spanish: La flaqueza del bolchevique) is a 2003 Spanish psychological drama film directed by Manuel Martín Cuenca from a screenplay he co-wrote with Lorenzo Silva, based on Silva's novel La flaqueza del bolchevique.

== Plot ==
In Madrid, a middle-aged man driving his car rams into the rear of another car that is driven by a woman named Sonsoles. They argue and then the frustrated businessman harasses her by sending lewd remarks on her phone. He stalks her and this eventually leads him to the school where her 15-year-old sister María studies. He follows her and introduces himself to her with a false name and profession. They start spending time together, going to a park and afterwards to the swimming complex. María later learns that the person she is seeing is named Pablo López. However, after an initial reluctance, she gives in and they again start to see each other. On the other hand, a colleague of Pablo is wooing him hard, but he disperses her advances as he has grown to have feelings for María. Meanwhile, Sonsoles's older lover fixes a device in her landline which traces unknown numbers and hence she knows that Pablo is behind the act. However, she does not know about her sister's involvement with him and so she sends goons after him to teach him a lesson. But when the goons target Pablo, María is with him, and she is molested by the goons. Pablo tries hard to save her, but he is captured, and when María tries to save herself by hitting one of the goons with her knee, she is thrown against a rock and dies on the spot. Pablo, overcome by sorrow and grief, stays by her until the police arrive and is arrested. In prison, he sees a flashback of María and becomes elated.

== Cast ==
- Luis Tosar as Pablo López
- Mar Regueras as Sonsoles
- María Valverde as María
- Nathalie Poza as Eva
- Manolo Solo as Francisco
- Jordi Dauder as Alfredo
- Yolanda Serrano as Alba
- Enriqueta Carballeira as Dolores
- Ángela Herrera as Elsa
- Rubén Ochandiano as Manu
- Roberto Drago as Raúl
- Daniel Grao as Perico
- José Antonio Izaguirre as Armando

== Production ==
The film is a Rioja Audiovisual production. It was shot in Madrid.

== Release ==
Distributed by United International Pictures, the film was theatrically released in Spain on 31 October 2003.

== Reception ==
Jonathan Holland of Variety considered the film to be a "superbly helmed and played parable of moral breakdown and recovery", "let down only by a weak conclusion".

Mirito Torreiro of Fotogramas gave the film 4 out of 5 stars, writing about the "effective, devastating and unquestionably moral" story, praising the discovery of the new talent María Valverde, whereas negatively assessing "a finale that deflates the earlier drama".

== Accolades ==
Year	Award	Category	Nominee(s)	Result	Ref.
2004	18th Goya Awards	Best Adapted Screenplay	Manuel Martín Cuenca, Lorenzo Silva	Nominated	
2004	18th Goya Awards	Best New Actress	María Valverde	Won	
2004	13th Actors and Actresses Union Awards	Best Film Actor in a Minor Role	Rubén Ochandiano	Nominated	
2004	13th Actors and Actresses Union Awards	Best New Actress	María Valverde	Nominated	

== See also ==
- List of Spanish films of 2003
