= The Night of the Brother =

- Theatrical release poster
- Spanish: La noche del hermano
- Directed by: Santiago García de Leániz
- Screenplay by: Santiago García de Leániz; Tatiana Rodríguez; Josep Bonet
- Produced by: Santiago García de Leániz; Enrique González Macho
- Starring: Jan Cornet; María Vázquez; Pablo Rivero; Iciar Bollain; Joan Dalmau; Luis Tosar
- Cinematography: Carles Gusi
- Edited by: Ángel Hernández Zoido
- Music by: Eva Gancedo
- Production companies: La Iguana; Alta Producción
- Distributed by: Alta Films
- Release date: 26 August 2005
- Country: Spain
- Language: Spanish

The Night of the Brother (Spanish: La noche del hermano) is a 2005 Spanish drama film directed by Santiago García de Leániz (in his directorial debut feature), who also co-wrote the screenplay. It stars Jan Cornet, María Vázquez, Pablo Rivero, Iciar Bollain, Joan Dalmau, and Luis Tosar.

== Plot ==
The story is set in the fictional town of Fortuna. Following the brutal murder of their parents by Álex, his younger brother Jaime is faced with the challenge of deciding his own future. This includes the possibility of selling the family's land and navigating a budding relationship with butcher Maria, all while contending with the looming presence of his brother in prison.

== Cast ==
- Jan Cornet as Jaime
- María Vázquez as María
- Pablo Rivero as Álex
- Joan Dalmau
- Iciar Bollain as Julia
- Luis Tosar as Lorenzo
- José Ángel Egido as Boluda

== Production ==
The film is a La Iguana and Alta Producción production. It was shot in locations of the Region of Murcia.

== Release ==
Distributed by Alta Films, the film was released theatrically in Spain on 26 August 2005.

== Critical reception ==
Jonathan Holland of Variety assessed that the film manages to combine "subtlety and intensity into a rich, understated and well-played whole".

Mirito Torreiro of Fotogramas rated the film 3 out of 5 stars writing that the helmer nails "a crime drama with perhaps a little too much hieratism in some of the characters" while otherwise appreciating the "description of the weight of the family inheritance and its extreme consistency".

== Accolades ==
Year	Award	Category	Nominee(s)	Result	Ref.
2006	20th Goya Awards	Best Original Score	Eva Gancedo	Nominated	
2006	20th Goya Awards	Best Original Song	Eva Gancedo, Yamil	Nominated	

== See also ==
- List of Spanish films of 2005
