= Icíar Bollaín =

Spanish actress, film director and screenwriter

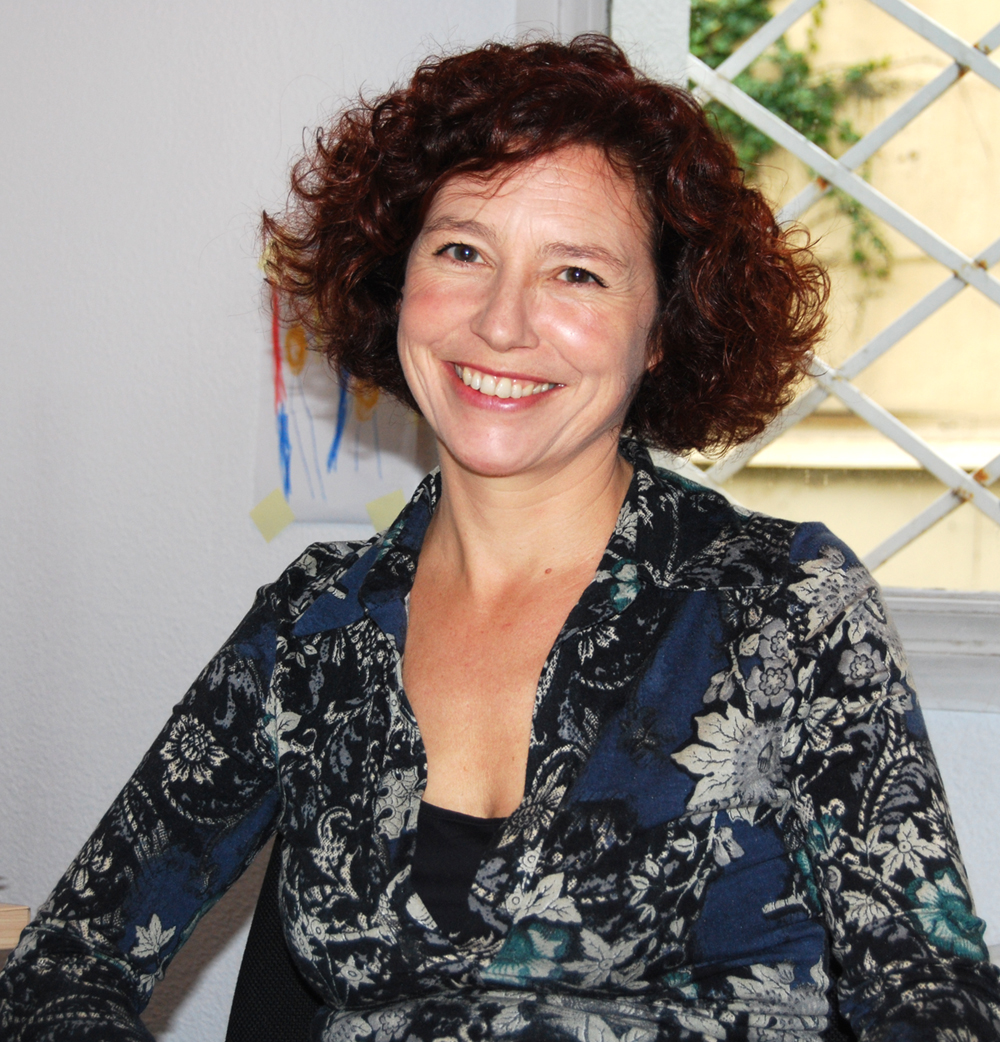
- Bollaín in 2010
- Born: Icíar Bollaín Pérez-Mínguez; 12 June 1967 (age 58); Madrid, Spain
- Occupations: Director; screenwriter; actress
- Years active: 1995–present

Icíar Bollaín Pérez-Mínguez (born 12 June 1967) is a Spanish filmmaker and actress. She is best known for directing Te Doy Mis Ojos (Take My Eyes), which won 7 Goya Awards. Bollaín has won other awards for acting and script-writing, as well as for directing.

== Early life and education ==
Icíar Bollaín Pérez-Mínguez was born in Madrid on 12 June 1967. She was one of twin girls to a father who was an aeronautical engineer and a mother who was a music teacher. She grew up in a liberal household in which each member was allowed to follow their own inclination. Icíar and her twin sister Marina showed an early interest in the arts; Icíar was inclined towards filmmaking while her sister studied to become an operatic singer. Bollaín was cast in Víctor Erice's El Sur (1983), for her acting debut.

== Career ==
Since then Icíar Bollaín has acted in fourteen films. At age 18, with her twin sister Marina, she was cast by their uncle Juan Sebastián Bollaín in two films: Las dos orillas (1987); several years later the twins appeared in Dime una mentira (1992). Icíar Bollaín also took roles in films directed by Felipe Vega, Manuel Gutiérrez Aragón and José Luis Borau. Her red hair was partly what led Ken Loach to choose her for his film, Land and Freedom (1995), about the Spanish Civil War. Her experience working with Loach led her to write the book: Ken Loach: un observador solitario.

Bollain, at age 23, formed a production company which she named La Iguana, and made two short films: Baja Corazón (1992) and Los Amigos del muerto (1994). With support from Fernando Colomo, she made her first feature film as director: Hola, ¿estás sola? (Hi, are you alone? in English) (1995), a story about two young girls who dream of finding an earthly paradise and undertake a long trip towards the sea. Her second feature film was Flores de otro mundo (Flowers from another world in English) (1999), which she co-wrote with Julio Llamazares. It is the story of three women who travel to rural Spain with the hopes of finding love. Her film Te Doy Mis Ojos (Take My Eyes) (2003) won seven Goya Awards, including Best Film and Best Director. Starring Luis Tosar and Laia Marull, the movie is about a man's abuse of his wife during their marriage, and their struggles to change the pattern of their lives.

Her 2010 film Even the Rain (Tambien la lluvia) was selected as the Spanish entry for the Best Foreign Language Film at the 83rd Academy Awards. In January 2011, the film made the final nine shortlist. A film within a film, it is set in the Bolivian highlands in 2000. A Spanish film company's work on Columbus' arrival in the New World gets caught up in local violence related to current exploitation of peasants. It stars Gael García Bernal as the director and Luis Tosar as the film producer. Carlos Aduviri, an Aymara who plays a native leader in the "film," takes the lead in organizing a resistance to water privatization; he was nominated for a Best Newcomer Award at the Goya Awards. In 2020, she was invited to membership in the AMPAS.

== Representative films ==
=== Flowers from Another World (Flores de otro mundo) (1999) ===
This movie can also be seen as a means of instruction for foreign students. It shows several key aspects of both the history of Spain and the socio-cultural evolution of the country. It tells the story of three women, Milady, from Cuba, Patricia, from the Dominican Republic and Marirrosi, from Bilbao. They have several existential problems and concerns regarding their future. These problems are similar to those suffered by three young men from Santa Eulalia, a village from the Province of Guadalajara, which is an unimportant small town without marriageable women. Damian, Alfonso and Carmelo (these young men) come into contact with the three women at a party organized by single people of the village. There they got to know each other and this gives place to a bittersweet story.

This cinematographic work is useful from an academic point of view, not only for its historical value, but also because it is presented as an open window that allows the viewer to take the place of the characters, suffering with them the same surprises and impressions, since the point of arrival of the women to Santa Eulalia. Other essential aspects of the film are that it offers the opportunity to understand one of the main points of the novel: the problems of the Spanish countryside. At the same time, Icíar Bollaín preserves the classic stereotypes of the typical Spanish town, where the bar is the most important forum for meetings and ideological defenses. But Bollaín doesn't leave behind the important issue of the leading sexism of the time, and she is also concerned to mitigate it largely by introducing characters like Doña Gregoria, who is the mother of one of the young men and also the reflection of the rural matriarchy.

Foreignness is another key point in this story. At the beginning of the film, with the arrival of the three women to the village, the feeling of strangeness and rejection towards the foreigners appears. However it starts disappearing with the development of loving relationships between them and the young men of Santa Eulalia. This is a clear solution to the problem of foreignness. Icíar Bollaín doesn't present a problem without the corresponding solution, introducing an integrative ideology that breaks with cultural and racial barriers, which is another important pillar of the film that is a recognized pedagogical intention.

Bollaín sets the film during the Spanish property bubble to reflect the issues and consequences that even today directly affect Spanish society. Flowers from Another World analyses not only the racial issue but also the role of women at that time. This can even be compared to other similar cases in which women start a movement for social integration, as in the case of the Mexican immigrant women in the United States. Everything is portrayed through the figures of the three women who star in this story.

=== Take my eyes (Te doy mis ojos) (2003) ===
This film is characterized for introducing a new element: the Painting. The use of pictorial art enriches the staging and the story itself, analyzing the narrative function that the works of this style can have within the Cinematography. While the painting does not carry a major role in the story of Pilar, a victim of domestic violence, it is crucial to the development of the main character. Thus, the Painting may be seen as a connector rather than a main narrative axis.

Somehow, through the painting, it is observed throughout the film how Pilar gets rid of the chains of the violence and abuse made by her husband. As Icíar Bollaín said, "Pilar meets art and thus begins to grow up emotionally and as a result she escapes from her difficult situation".This could be taken as an example for all the women who have the same problem, so that they can stop the abuse and free themselves from those chains as Pilar does in the movie. Throughout the film different pictures (mainly Mythology ones) are used to reflect the development of the main character on a personal and social level.

=== Even the Rain (También la lluvia) (2010) ===
This film by Icíar Bollaín could be perfectly defined as a "film within a film" because it uses two storylines to tell the tense situation that exists in Bolivia. All related to the heritage and colonial legacy. On the one hand, in this film, there is a low budget film about Christopher Columbus and the Discovery of America in 1492 being recorded. While, on the other hand, the famous Water War (Bolivia) of Cochabamba (April 2000) is taking place.

== Personal life ==
Bollaín has been in a relationship with Scottish-Irish screenwriter and lawyer Paul Laverty since 1995, after meeting on the set of Land and Freedom. The couple live in Edinburgh with their three children.

In September 2025, she signed an open pledge with Film Workers for Palestine pledging not to work with Israeli film institutions "that are implicated in genocide and apartheid against the Palestinian people."

== Filmography ==
=== As director ===
Year	English title	Original title	Notes
1993		Baja, corazón	Short Film
1994		Los amigos del muerto	Short Film
1995	Hi, Are You Alone?	Hola, ¿estás sola?	
1999	Flowers From Another World	Flores de otro mundo	
2000		Amores que matan	Short Film. Inspired her movie Te doy mis ojos
2002		Viajes con mi abuela	Short Film
2003	Take My Eyes	Te doy mis ojos	
2007	Mataharis	Mataharis	
2010	Even the Rain	Tambien la lluvia	Spanish official entry for Academy Awards
2011	Katmandu	Katmandú, un espejo en el cielo	
2016	The Olive Tree	El olivo	
2018	Yuli: The Carlos Acosta Story	Yuli	
2020	Rosa's Wedding	La boda de rosa	
2021	Maixabel	Maixabel	Political drama about a victim of terrorism and second chances.
2024	I'm Nevenka	Soy Nevenka	Feminist movie about sexual harassment.

=== As actress ===
Year	Title	Notes
2005	La noche del hermano	
2003	La balsa de piedra	
2002	Nos miran	
2002	Sara, una estrella	
2000	Leo	
1997	Subjudice	
1997	Niño nadie	
1996	Menos de cero	
1995	El techo del mundo	
1994	Land and Freedom	
1993	Jardines colgantes	
1993	Tocando fondo	
1993	Dime una mentira	
1992	Entretiempo	
1992	Un paraguas para tres	
1991	Sublet	
1990	Polvo enamorado	
1990	Doblones de a ocho	
1990	El mejor de los tiempos	
1989	Venecias	
1989	Malaventura	
1987	Mientras haya luz	
1987	Al acecho	
1986	Las dos orillas	
1983	El Sur	

=== Music videos ===
Year	Title	Notes
2009	Romper (Album: Dramas y Caballeros)	Singer: Luis Ramiro

== Awards ==
Year	Award	Category	Title	Result	Notes
1999	Cannes Film Festival	International Critics' Week Grand Prix award	Flowers from Another World (Flores de otro mundo)	Won	
2004	Goya Awards	Best Film	Te Doy Mis Ojos (Take My Eyes)	Won	
2004	Goya Awards	Best Director	Te Doy Mis Ojos (Take My Eyes)	Won	
2004	Goya Awards	Best Original Screenplay	Te Doy Mis Ojos (Take My Eyes)	Won	

== Bibliography ==
- Bollaín, Icíar (1996). Ken Loach, un observador solitario. El País-Aguilar. ISBN 8403597347.
