= Hola, ¿estás sola? =

1995 film directed by Icíar Bollaín

- Directed by: Icíar Bollaín
- Written by: Icíar Bollaín; Julio Médem
- Produced by: Fernando Colomo; Beatriz de la Gándara; Santiago García de Leániz
- Starring: Silke; Candela Peña; Álex Angulo; Elena Irureta; Arcadi Levin; Daniel Guzmán
- Music by: Bernardo Bonezzi
- Production company: Producciones JRB
- Distributed by: Alta Films
- Release date: 1995
- Running time: 92 minutes
- Country: Spain
- Languages: Spanish; Russian; English
- Box office: $1.14 million (Spain)

Hola, ¿estás sola? (Hi, Are You Alone?) is a 1995 Spanish film, a road movie, starring Silke and Candela Peña. It marked the debut of Icíar Bollaín as a film director. She also co-wrote the script.

== Synopsis ==
Nina is a twenty-year-old girl from Valladolid who lives with her divorced father. She and her friend Trini go on a risky voyage to Madrid and later to the Costa del Sol.
