= Fatum (2023 film) =

- Theatrical release poster
- Directed by: Juan Galiñanes
- Screenplay by: Juan Galiñanes; Alberto Marini
- Produced by: Emma Lustres; Borja Pena
- Starring: Luis Tosar; Álex García; Arón Piper; Luisa Mayol; Elena Anaya
- Cinematography: Alex de Pablo
- Edited by: Lu Rodríguez
- Music by: Manuel Riveiro
- Production companies: Vaca Films; Playtime Productions
- Distributed by: Universal Pictures International Spain
- Release date: 28 April 2023 (Spain)
- Countries: Spain; France
- Language: Spanish

Fatum is a 2023 Spanish-French thriller film directed by Juan Galiñanes from a screenplay by Alberto Marini and Galiñanes which stars Álex García, Luis Tosar, Arón Piper, Luisa Mayol, and Elena Anaya.

== Plot ==
Ludomaniac Sergio attends a gambling house to recover his lost money upon learning about a rumour concerning a purported fixed football fixture result which turns out to be true, but armed Alejo assaults the place. National Police agent Costa tasks GEO sniper Pablo, in a dire personal situation, to serve during the robbing attempt.

== Cast ==
- Luis Tosar as Sergio
- Arón Piper as Alejo
- Álex García as Pablo
- Elena Anaya as comisaria Costa
- Luisa Mayol as Lidia
- Pepa Gracia
- Ethan Álvarez
- Valentina Quiza
- Derek León

== Production ==
The screenplay was penned by Juan Galiñanes and Alberto Marini. The film was produced by Vaca Films alongside Playtime Productions, and it had the participation of RTVE, Amazon, TVG and support from ICAA and Agadic. Shooting locations in Galicia included A Coruña. Lu Rodríguez worked as film editor and Manuel Riveiro was responsible for the score, whilst Alejandro de Pablo lensed the film.

== Release ==
Distributed by Universal Pictures International Spain, the film was released theatrically in Spain on 28 April 2023.

== Reception ==
Juan Pando of Fotogramas rated Fatum 3 out of 5 stars, deeming it to be a "good spectacle" owing to a "a well-squared script, with well-defined characters, unusual yet plausible situations and a well-dosed increasing suspense leading towards an uncertain denouement", while decrying the makeup and hairdressing of Tosar's character.

Raquel Hernández Luján of HobbyConsolas rated Galiñanes' debut with 73 points ('good'), deeming it to be a "very satisfying" film thanks to the social criticism vis-à-vis betting shops, the "magnificent" performances by Anaya and García and a script "that keeps you gripped until the last minute", while citing how Tosar's character becomes very obnoxious, with "no possibility of empathizing with him", as a negative point.

== Accolades ==
Year	Award	Category	Nominee(s)	Result	Ref.
2024	22nd Mestre Mateo Awards	Best Film		Nominated	
2024	22nd Mestre Mateo Awards	Best Director	Juan Galiñanes	Nominated	
2024	22nd Mestre Mateo Awards	Best Screenplay	Olga Osorio, Araceli Gonda	Nominated	
2024	22nd Mestre Mateo Awards	Best Actor	Luis Tosar	Nominated	
2024	22nd Mestre Mateo Awards	Best Editing	Lu Rodríguez	Nominated	
2024	22nd Mestre Mateo Awards	Best Costume Design	María Porto Romero	Nominated	

== See also ==
- List of Spanish films of 2023
