= Flowers from Another World =

- Theatrical release poster
- Spanish: Flores de otro mundo
- Directed by: Icíar Bollaín
- Written by: Icíar Bollaín; Julio Llamazares
- Produced by: Santiago García de Leániz; Enrique González Macho
- Starring: José Sancho; Luis Tosar; Lissete Mejía
- Cinematography: Teo Delgado
- Edited by: Ángel Hernández Zoido
- Music by: Pascal Gaigne
- Production companies: La Iguana; Alta Films
- Release date: 28 May 1999
- Running time: 105 minutes
- Country: Spain
- Language: Spanish

Flowers from Another World (Spanish: Flores de otro mundo) is a 1999 Spanish film, directed and co-written by Icíar Bollaín and starring José Sancho, Luis Tosar and Lisete Mejía. The plot follows three women who arrive in a village in rural Spain looking for love and to start a new life. Very well received, the film won the International Critics' Week Grand Prix award at the Cannes Film Festival.

== Plot ==
A group of women arrive by bus to a small town in the depopulated central Province of Guadalajara, where there is a scarcity of single women and economic opportunities. The men have organized an annual party to get to know available ladies with the hopes of falling in love and finding a wife. Women hope to find stability, companionship, immigration papers or a combination of the three.

The group of women include Marirrosi, a divorced nurse from Bilbao who is lonely and looking for love; Patricia, a young woman with two children from the Dominican Republic who has been in Spain illegally and is having difficulty finding decent work; and (joining later) Milady, a young Cuban who wants to see the world at any cost. They come to the town filled with eager men but few opportunities other than farming.

Patricia settles with Damian, a hardworking farmer who lives with his mother, Gregoria. Looking to find stability for her young children and a hard worker herself, Patricia tries in vain to find common ground with her stern mother-in-law, who seems to reject her because of her skin color and the fact that her son is no longer under her control. Patricia, with more time and experience in Spain, befriends the newcomer, Milady.

Milady settles with Carmelo, an older Spanish man who wooed her in Havana. Carmelo tries to impress her with a big television and modern kitchen, but what she really wants to do is go to discos and have fun. She is in no way ready to settle down. Her dream of a life in Europe is very different from his fantasy of life with a gorgeous young wife. Milady is flirty and does not love Carmelo. Wanting to see the sea in Valencia, she takes a ride from a truck driver. When she comes back to town, the jealous Carmelo gives her a beating. Milady wishes she could leave him, but she has few friends and no real place to go.

Marirrosi, the oldest of the three women, has a grown-up son and is tired of her job in Bilbao. She finds love with Alfonso, a gentle soft-spoken gardener. However, she is unwilling to give up city life for fields and cows, while he is unwilling to even consider living in a city. Unable to resolve their differences, she eventually breaks up with him.

At the farm, Patricia is visited by some of her friends. This creates a confrontation with Gregoria, but Damian comes to Patricia's defense, and the relation between the two women improves. However, the father of Patricia's two children reappears, wanting to take advantage of her steadier situation. In a frank talk with Damian, Patricia admits that if she could have found work and been able to take care for herself either in the Dominican Republic or Spain, she probably would not have married him. But now that she is there, she realizes that she wants to be his companion and stable love. Damian and Patricia have an argument after her honest revelation. He believes that she is taking advantage of him and tells her to leave with her children. At the last minute, persuaded by his mother, Damian reconciles with Patricia. Later on, Patricia's daughter is seen celebrating her first communion in the local church.

Milady captures the attention of Oscar, a young man infatuated with her. He helps her escape the town but in a stop in a hotel, she leaves him, taking the road on her own. Carmelo deals alone with his disappointment of Milady's sudden departure.

Alfonso is devastated when he receives Marirrosi's letter breaking up with him. At the village's bar, Alfonso gives some advice to the local single men. Another bus, full of hopeful single women, is arriving in town.

== Cast ==
- José Sancho as Carmelo
- Luis Tosar as Damián
- Lissete Mejía as Patricia
- Chete Lera as Alfonso
- Marilyn Torres as Milady
- Elena Irureta as Marirrosi
- Amparo Valle as Gregoria
- Rubén Ochandiano as Oscar
- Ángela Herrera as Lorna
- Doris Cerdá as Daisy
- Chiqui Fernández as Aurora
- Carlos Kaniowsky as Felipe
- Isabel de los Santos as Janay
- Antonio de la Torre as truck driver

== Influence ==
The film was inspired by Spanish country bachelors, such as those from Plan, who organized parties to attract marriable women from cities, since rural women tended to emigrate to the cities. These "caravans of women" took inspiration from the Western Westward the Women.

== DVD release ==
Flores de otro mundo (flowers from another world) was released on DVD in the United States on October 18, 2005. The film is in Spanish with English subtitles. There are no extras features.

== See also ==
- List of Spanish films of 1999

== Bibliography ==
- Benavent, Francisco Maria. Cine Español de los Noventa. Ediciones Mensajero, 2000.
