= Take My Eyes =

- Theatrical release poster
- Spanish: Te doy mis ojos
- Directed by: Icíar Bollaín
- Written by: Icíar Bollaín; Alicia Luna
- Produced by: Santiago García de Leániz
- Starring: Laia Marull; Luis Tosar; Candela Peña; Rosa María Sardá; Sergi Calleja; Kiti Manver
- Cinematography: Carles Gusi
- Edited by: Ángel Hernández Zoido
- Music by: Alberto Iglesias
- Distributed by: Sogepaq
- Release date: 2003
- Running time: 109 min.
- Country: Spain
- Language: Spanish

Take My Eyes (Spanish: Te Doy Mis Ojos, lit. 'I Give You My Eyes') is a 2003 Spanish drama film directed and co-written by Icíar Bollaín, starring Laia Marull and Luis Tosar. Critically acclaimed for its unclichéd treatment of domestic violence, it won seven Goya Awards in 2004, including Best Picture, Best Director, Best Lead Actor, Best Lead Actress, and Best Supporting Actress. Shooting locations included Toledo.

== Plot ==
Pilar, a meek housewife living in Toledo, gathers a few belongings one night and flees her apartment with her seven-year-old son, Juan. They find shelter with Pilar's sister, Ana, who is to marry her Scottish live-in boyfriend. Pilar's husband, Antonio, tries to make her change her mind, but she is tired and fearful due to his abusive behavior. Determined to start a new life on her own, Pilar sends her sister to retrieve her belongings from the apartment she shared with Antonio. Once there, Ana discovers through medical bills that her sister has been physically abused by Antonio. When he arrives, Ana confronts him.

Trying to bring Pilar back, Antonio joins an anger management group for married men. With her sister's encouragement, Pilar finds a job in the gift shop of a local tourist attraction, where Ana also works restoring paintings. Pilar begins to study in order to become a tour guide.

Despite Ana's protests, her mother Aurora invites Antonio to Juan's birthday party. Pilar still has feelings towards Antonio despite his abusive behavior. Juan misses his father and Pilar begins to soften her attitude towards her husband. When they have a chance to talk, Antonio tells her he wants to change and is enrolled in group therapy. Pilar soon warms up to him again, and they begin to sneak out for secret meetings and romantic encounters. Pilar, with the full support of her mother, takes Antonio to Ana's wedding. The two sisters argue after Pilar tells Ana that she is going back to her husband. At first, Pilar and Antonio seem happy together. Encouraged by his wife, Antonio continues with his anger management therapy. However, he feels threatened by Pilar's economic independence, as she continues to work in the gift shop.

Pilar applies for a job as a tour guide in a museum in Madrid. They would have to leave Toledo and live in Madrid, but Antonio is afraid to move, fearing it would be difficult for him to find an equivalent level of job in Madrid. Pilar's efforts to convince him that if she gets the job and they move to Madrid it would be beneficial fall on deaf ears. The day of her job interview, as a coworker is waiting for her outside the flat to take her there, Antonio explodes in anger. He tears off Pilar's clothes and locks her stark naked in the balcony for all the neighbors to see. After this humiliation, Pilar threatens to leave Antonio, who responds by attempting suicide by cutting. After this final assault, Pilar leaves Antonio for good.

== Cast ==
- Laia Marull as Pilar
- Luis Tosar as Antonio
- Candela Peña as Ana
- Rosa María Sardá as Aurora
- Kiti Manver as Rosa
- Sergi Calleja as Therapist
- Elisabet Gelabert as Lola
- Nicolás Fernández Luna as Juan
- David Mooney as John
- Chus Gutiérrez as Raquel
- Elena Irureta as Carmen

== Reception ==
Critics praised it for its internal conflict and mature depiction of domestic violence.

== Accolades ==
Year	Award	Category	Nominee(s)	Result	Ref.
2004	18th Goya Awards	Best Film		Won	
2004	18th Goya Awards	Best Director	Iciar Bollain	Won	
2004	18th Goya Awards	Best Original Screenplay	Iciar Bollain, Alicia Luna	Won	
2004	18th Goya Awards	Best Actor	Luis Tosar	Won	
2004	18th Goya Awards	Best Actress	Laia Marull	Won	
2004	18th Goya Awards	Best Supporting Actress	Candela Peña	Won	
2004	18th Goya Awards	Best New Actress	Elisabet Gelabert	Nominated	
2004	18th Goya Awards	Best Sound	Eva Valiño, Pelayo Gutiérrez, Alfonso Pino, José Luis Crespo	Won	
2004	18th Goya Awards	Best Editing	Ángel Hernández Zoido	Nominated	
2004	13th Actors and Actresses Union Awards	Best Film Actress in a Leading Role	Laia Marull	Won	
2004	13th Actors and Actresses Union Awards	Best Film Actor in a Leading Role	Luis Tosar	Won	
2004	13th Actors and Actresses Union Awards	Best Film Actress in a Secondary Role	Candela Peña	Won	
2005	47th Ariel Awards	Best Ibero-American Film		Nominated	

== See also ==
- List of Spanish films of 2003
