= Luis Tosar =

Spanish actor (born 1971)

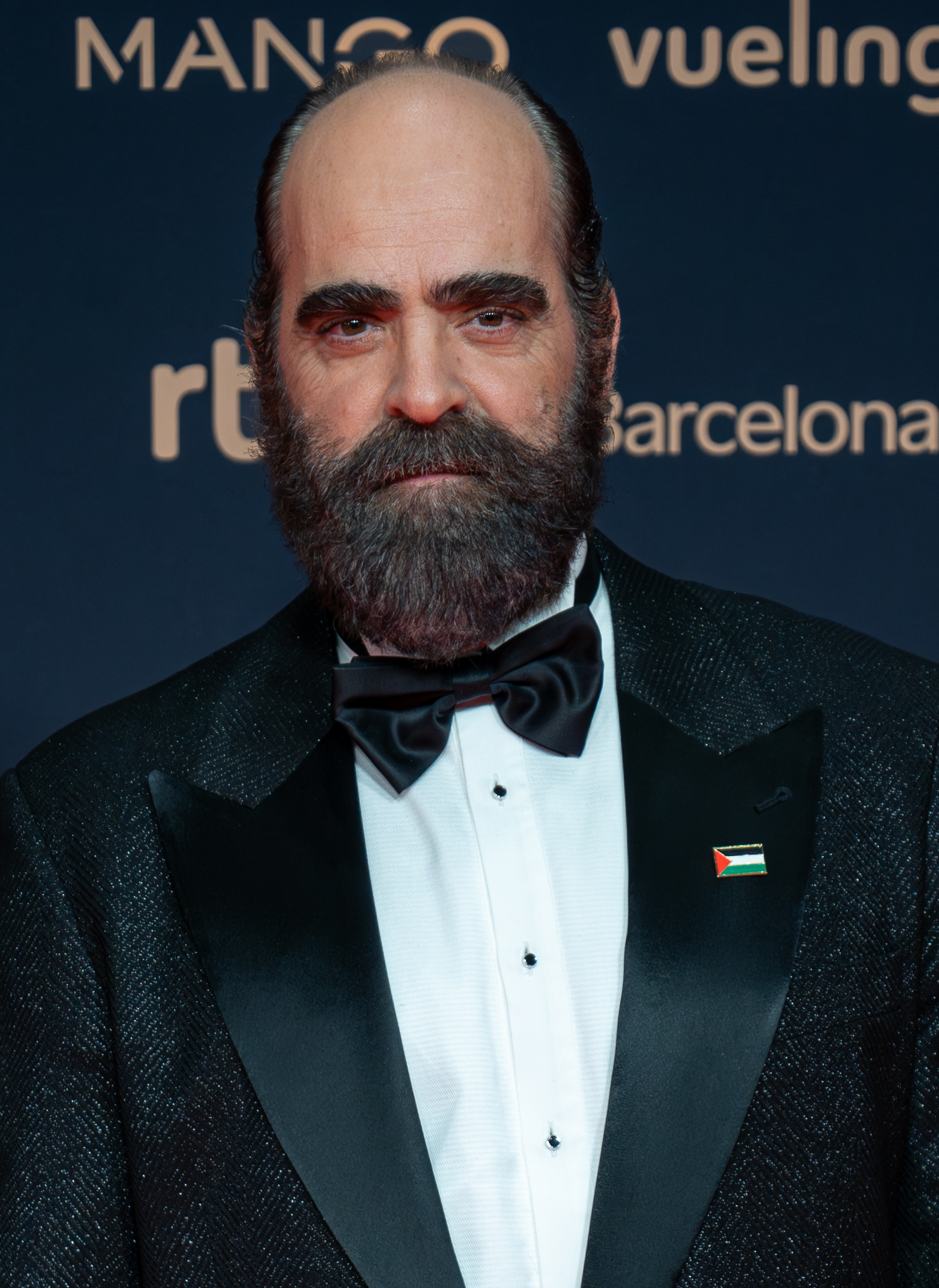
- Tosar in 2026
- Born: Luis López Tosar; 13 October 1971 (age 54); Lugo, Galicia, Spain
- Occupations: Actor; film producer
- Years active: 1994–present
- Spouse: María Luisa Mayol (m. 2015)
- Children: 2

Luis López Tosar (born 13 October 1971) is a Spanish actor from Galicia. He is one of the most recognizable and versatile actors in Spain.

He landed his film debut in Atilano for President (1998), followed by other roles in feature films such as Flowers from Another World (1999), Common Wealth (2000) and No News from God (2001). He won early acclaim and recognition for his performances in Mondays in the Sun (2002) and Take My Eyes (2003).

After a career turning point in the wake of his performance as Malamadre in Cell 211 (2009), he has often been typecast in thriller films, going on to star in titles such as El Niño (2014), Retribution (2015), Gun City (2018), Eye for an Eye (2019), Code Name: Emperor (2022), On the Fringe (2022), All the Names of God (2023), Fatum (2023), Undercover (2024), and Golpes (2025).

== Early life ==
Tosar was born on 13 October 1971 in Lugo, although he usually prefers to identify with the parish of Xustás (in the municipality of Cospeito, also in the province of Lugo), where he spent his childhood and teenage years.

For two years (coincididing with the 1st- and 2nd-year of BUP), he had reportedly become a somewhat introspective and weird teenager, developing an acute interest for survival books and solo trips into the wilderness to set animal traps. At the time, he considered joining the Armed Forces, as "it was the only place" that offered him what he was looking for. He later became a conscientious objector.

== Screen career ==
He began his career playing theater and shorts, but he gained notoriety in Galicia for his performance in 1998 television series Mareas Vivas (Televisión de Galicia).

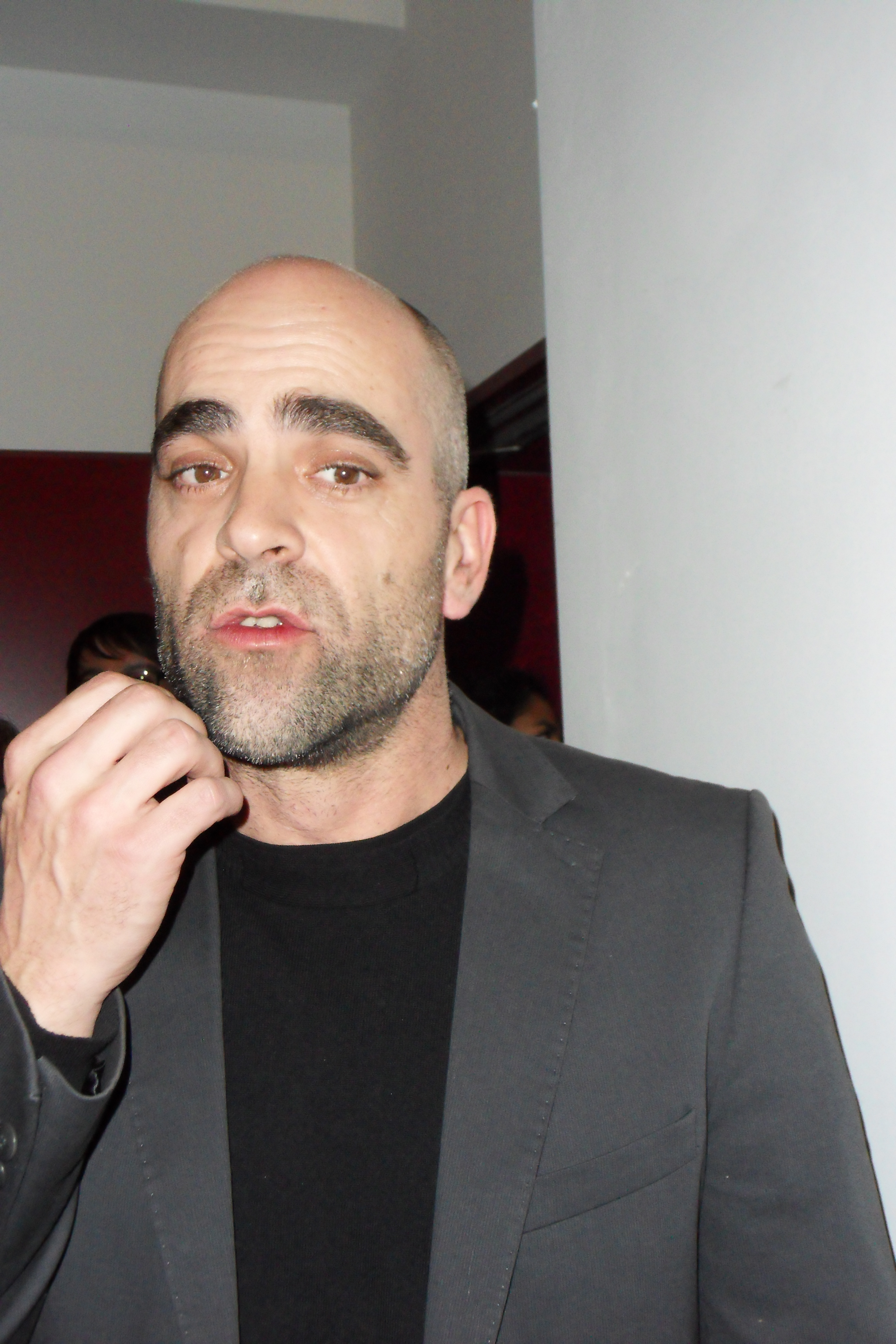
Tosar attending a screening of Even the Rain at the 2011 Berlinale.

Tosar made his big screen debut with a minor role in the comedy film Atilano for President (1998).

His supporting performance as Damián in 1999 immigration-themed film Flowers from Another World earned him a nomination for the Goya Award for Best New Actor.

Critically acclaimed for his supporting role in the unemployment drama Mondays in the Sun, abusive husband in Take My Eyes, an executive producer in Even the Rain, and doorman in Sleep Tight, his most acclaimed performance was from 2009 hit Cell 211 which stars Tosar as Malamadre, a prisoner that instigates a riot and befriends an undercover prison guard in the process. His only major role in an American film was Michael Mann's Miami Vice (2006), playing Colombian druglord Montoya. Besides that he has appeared in other English films The Limits of Control and Mr. Nice.

In 2012 he dubbed George Washington for the videogame Assassin's Creed III.

He starred in the action thriller Retribution (2015) as a bank executive threatened by a bomb under his car seat. He billed the role as the most demanding of his career from an emotional standpoint and for reaching such extreme moods. For his work in the film, he clinched a nomination for the Goya Award for Best Actor.

On 17 November 2018 he received a star in the Almeria Walk of Fame for the films El Niño (2014) and Toro (2016).

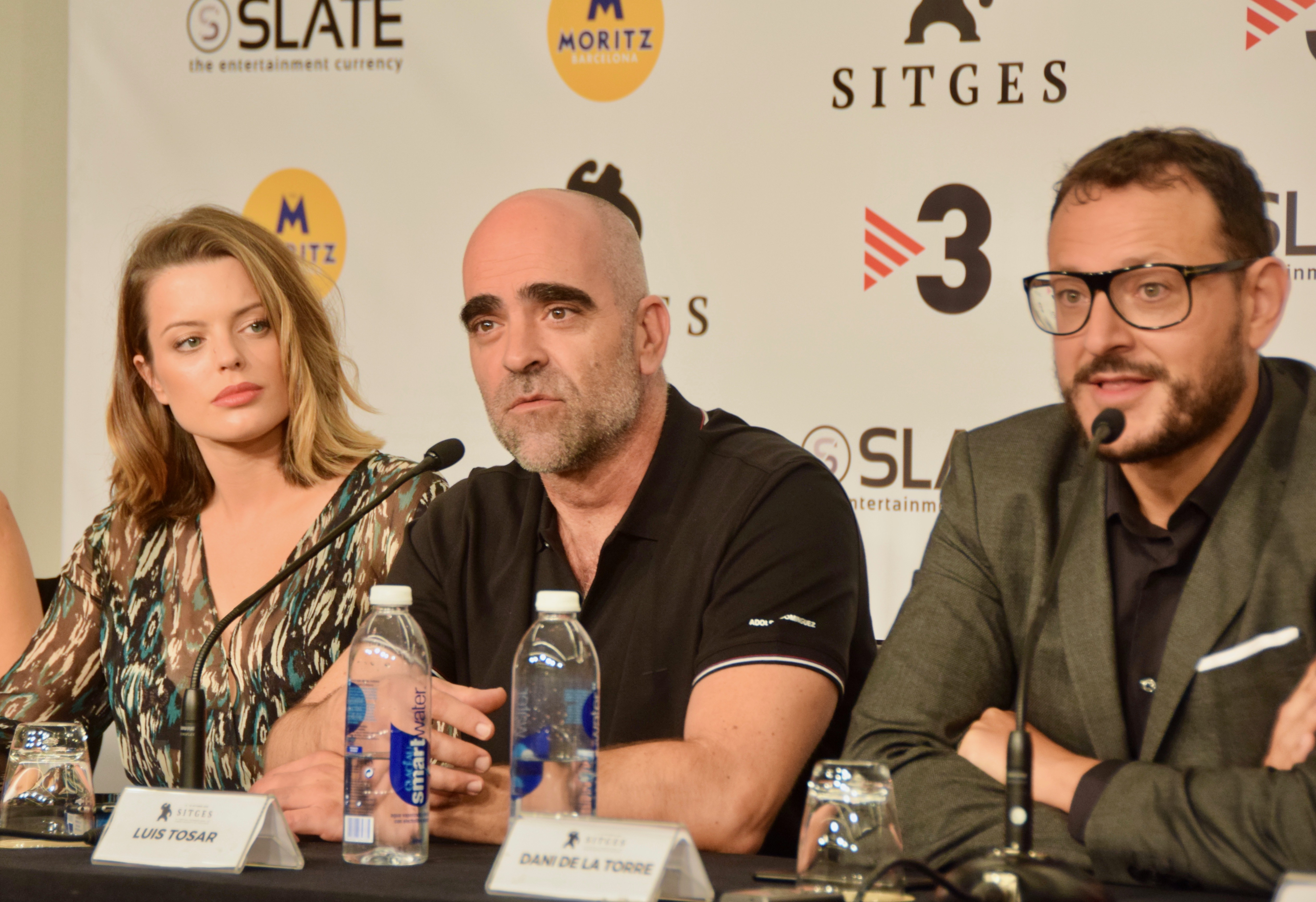
Tosar (centre) with Adriana Torrebejano and Dani de la Torre during a panel for the presentation of Gun City at the 2018 Sitges Film Festival.

He played a hardboiled and taciturn cop with a past marked by the Morocco War in the gangster film Gun City (2018) set in 1920s Barcelona.

Tosar landed another nomination for the Goya Award for Best Leading Actor for his work in the thriller film Eye for an Eye (2019) playing Mario, a nurse consumed by resentment. Tosar was drawn to the character for his "moral complexity".

He starred as one of the killers of Juan Mari Jaúregui in the drama film Maixabel (2021) opposite Blanca Portillo exploring the relationship between ETA victims and victimizers. He met the ETA member he portrayed in order to prepare for the role. For his performance in the film, he obtained a nomination for Best Leading Actor at the 36th Goya Awards. He landed another nomination in the following year for his performance as a lawyer in the eviction-themed thriller On the Fringe.

He went on to star in the spy thriller film Code Name: Emperor (2022) as a CNI agent involved in murky tasks pertaining the Spanish deep state. He prepared his role in the film by "reading newspapers". He played a taxi driver turned into a walking human bomb in the action thriller All the Names of God (2023). While the film shares a similar premise to Retribution (2015), Tosar stated that his respective characters in both films were different, as unlike the morally dubious character of the 2015 film, his character in the 2023 film is a completely normal dude wrapped up in something extraordinary.

In 2024, he played the police chief in charge of a counterterrorism team in Undercover, receiving another nomination for the Best Supporting Actor Goya. He played a cop clashing with his criminal brother in the neo-quinqui thriller film Golpes (2025).

In December 2025, he was announced as recipient of the Gold Medal of Merit in the Fine Arts.

He starred as a recovering alcoholic and EMT finding out about the extreme right affiliations of his daughter in the action thriller miniseries Salvador, released on Netflix in 2026.

== Music ==
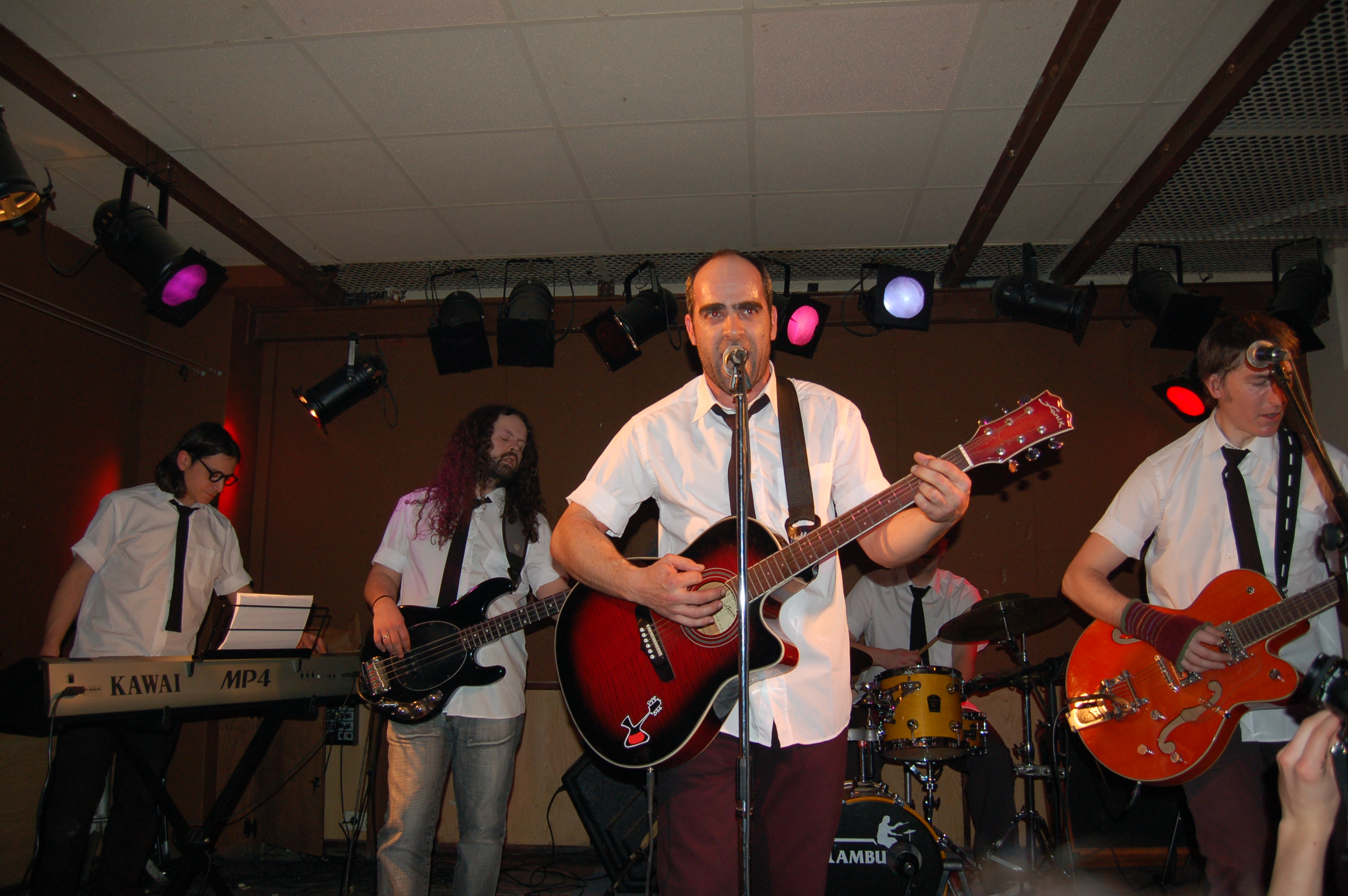
Tosar performing with The Ellas in 2007

Tosar is a member of a band called Di Elas (originally The Ellas).

== Views and stances ==
Tosar lent vocal support to the Nunca Máis platform formed as a response to the 2002 Prestige oil spill.

Close to the Galician Nationalist Bloc in the 2010s, Tosar ran as candidate in the Galeusca list to the 2004 European Parliament election.

In July 2025, Tosar signed a letter sent to the Government of Spain along with over 1,200 professionals demanding an immediate and comprehensive embargo of arms and defense material on Israel by means of a Royal Decree-Law. Also in 2025, Tosar joined the manifesto promoted by FiSahara decrying the filming of The Odyssey in Moroccan-occupied Western Sahara.

In September 2026, he co-signed the manifesto "against the genocide in Palestine and in defense of freedom of expression" alongside other professionals in the Spanish film industry demanding "an immediate end to the genocide being perpetrated by the State of Israel in Gaza and compliance with UN resolutions calling for its withdrawal from the occupied territories" as well as dennouncing "the censorship, persecution and threats" against NAZA directors Yuval Abraham and Rachel Szor.

== Family ==
In 2015, Tosar married actress María Luisa Mayol. They have two children.

== Accolades ==
Tosar won the Málaga Lifetime Achievement Award at the 2011 Málaga Spanish Film Festival.

Year	Award	Category	Work	Result	Ref.
2000	14th Goya Awards	Best New Actor	Flowers from Another World	Nominated	
2003	17th Goya Awards	Best Supporting Actor	Mondays in the Sun	Won	
2003	12th Actors and Actresses Union Awards	Best Film Actor in a Secondary Role	Mondays in the Sun	Won	
2003	51st San Sebastián International Film Festival	Silver Shell for Best Actor	Take My Eyes	Won	
2004	18th Goya Awards	Best Actor	Take My Eyes	Won	
2004	13th Actors and Actresses Union Awards	Best Film Actor in a Leading Role	Take My Eyes	Won	
2010	15th Forqué Awards	Best Actor	Cell 211	Won	
2010	24th Goya Awards	Best Actor	Cell 211	Won	
2010	19th Actors and Actresses Union Awards	Best Film Actor in a Leading Role	Cell 211	Won	
2010	23rd European Film Awards	Best European Actor	Cell 211	Nominated	
2011	16th Forqué Awards	Best Actor	Even the Rain	Won	
2011	66th CEC Medals	Best Actor	Even the Rain	Nominated	
2011	25th Goya Awards	Best Actor	Even the Rain	Nominated	
2012	17th Forqué Awards	Best Actor	Sleep Tight	Nominated	
2012	4th Gaudí Awards	Best Actor	Sleep Tight	Won	
2012	26th Goya Awards	Best Actor	Sleep Tight	Nominated	
2013	68th CEC Medals	Best Actor	Operation E	Nominated	
2015	7th Gaudí Awards	Best Actor	El Niño	Nominated	
2016	21st Forqué Awards	Best Actor	Retribution	Nominated	
2016	3rd Feroz Awards	Best Actor	Retribution	Nominated	
2016	71st CEC Medals	Best Actor	Retribution	Nominated	
2016	71st CEC Medals	Best Supporting Actor	Ma Ma	Nominated	
2016	30th Goya Awards	Best Actor	Retribution	Nominated	
2019	17th Mestre Mateo Awards	Best Actor	Gun City	Won	
2020	75th CEC Medals	Best Actor	Eye for an Eye	Nominated	
2020	34th Goya Awards	Best Actor	Eye for an Eye	Nominated	
2020	18th Mestre Mateo Awards	Best Actor	Eye for an Eye	Nominated	
2021	27th Forqué Awards	Best Actor	Maixabel	Nominated	
2022	77th CEC Medals	Best Actor	Maixabel	Nominated	
2022	36th Goya Awards	Best Actor	Maixabel	Nominated	
2022	30th Actors and Actresses Union Awards	Best Film Actor in a Leading Role	Maixabel	Nominated	
2022	9th Platino Awards	Best Actor	Maixabel	Nominated	
2022	28th Forqué Awards	Best Film Actor	On the Fringe	Nominated	
2023	10th Feroz Awards	Best Actor in a Film	On the Fringe	Nominated	
2023	37th Goya Awards	Best Actor	On the Fringe	Nominated	
2023	21st Mestre Mateo Awards	Best Actor	Code Name: Emperor	Nominated	
2023	10th Platino Awards	Best Actor	On the Fringe	Nominated	
2024	22nd Mestre Mateo Awards	Best Actor	Fatum	Nominated	
2025	26th Iris Awards	Best Actor	The Law of the Sea	Nominated	
2025	80th CEC Medals	Best Supporting Actor	Undercover	Won	
2025	39th Goya Awards	Best Supporting Actor	Undercover	Nominated	
2025	12th Platino Awards	Best Actor	Undercover	Nominated	
2026	81st CEC Medals	Best Supporting Actor	Golpes	Nominated	
2026	24th Mestre Mateo Awards	Best Actor	Golpes	Pending	

=== Celda 211 (Cell 211) (2009) ===
- 2010 Cinema Writers Circle Awards, Spain
  - Best Actor (Mejor Actor)
- 2010 Fotogramas de Plata
  - Best Movie Actor (Mejor Actor de Cine)
- 2010 Premios ACE
  - Cinema - Best Actor
- 2010 Seattle International Film Festival
  - Best Actor

=== Te doy mis ojos (Take My Eyes) (2003) ===
- 2005 Cartagena Film Festival
  - Best Actor (Mejor Actor)
- 2004 Cinema Writers Circle Awards, Spain
  - Best Actor (Mejor Actor) for: Take My Eyes (2003) and The Weakness of the Bolshevik (2003)
- 2004 Copenhagen International Film Festival
  - Best Actor
- 2004 Fotogramas de Plata
  - Best Movie Actor (Mejor Actor de Cine)
- 2004 Seattle International Film Festival
  - Best Actor
- 2004 Turia Awards
  - Best Actor

=== Los lunes al sol (Mondays in the Sun) (2002) ===
- 2003 Cinema Writers Circle Awards, Spain
  - Best Supporting Actor (Mejor Actor Secundario)
- 2003 Sant Jordi Awards
  - Best Spanish Actor (Mejor Actor Español)
