= Manuela Vellés =

Spanish actress

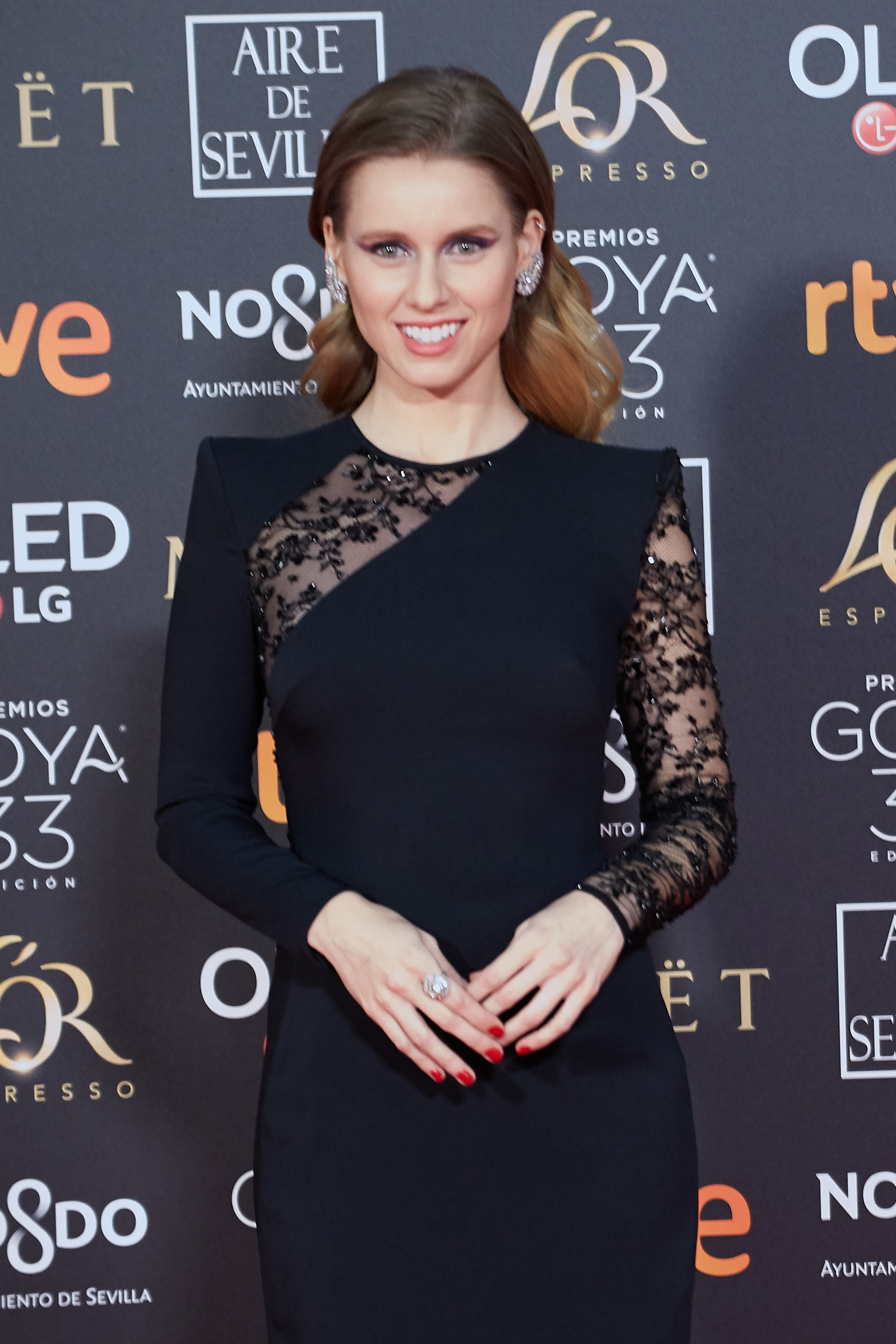
- At the 2019 Goya Awards
- Born: Manuela Vellés Casariego; 16 January 1987 (age 39); Madrid, Spain
- Occupations: Actress, singer
- Years active: 2007–present

Manuela Vellés Casariego (born 16 January 1987) is a Spanish actress best known for her appearances in television series and films.

== Biography ==
Manuela Vellés comes from a family of artists, writers, and designers, and her parents are architects. She began her theatrical acting studies at the school of Argentine director Juan Carlos Corazza, in the course "Theater for Youth". She continued her training with Jorge Eines, Augusto Fernandes, and Fernando Leones, and later, in 2010, she attended The Acting School of London.

In addition to working as an actress, she has developed a parallel career as a musician. She has performed songs in several movies and series, and composes her own songs on guitar.

== Professional career ==
Vellés made her cinematic debut in 2007, after Julio Medem selected her in a casting to be the protagonist of Caótica Ana.

She then obtained her first regular role as the second lead of the Antena 3 series La chica de ayer, based on the British Life on Mars. In 2009 she joined the cast of the third season of the TVE telenovela La Señora.

In 2010 she appeared on one of the productions for which she has received the most recognition, Hispania, la leyenda. Vellés played Elena during the series' three seasons. That same year she also premiered the mini-series La piel azul directed by Gonzalo López-Gallego and the films Kidnapped by Miguel Ángel Vivas and Retornos by Luis Avilés.

In 2012, after the end of Hispania, Vellés focused on her film career until 2014, when she was added to the cast of the period series Velvet. Vellés played Luisa Rivas during the first three seasons of the series, although in the third season she only appeared as a guest star in one episode.

On the big screen she has been part of the cast of productions such as Al final todos mueren, The Bride by Paula Ortiz, and Muse by Jaume Balagueró.

In 2015 she participated in the theatrical production The Trickster of Seville by playwright Tirso de Molina and directed by Darío Facal. In 2017 she returned to work under Facal in the play Punk&Love, which she starred in with Daniel Grao.

Besides being an actress, Vellés has also worked as a singer, giving various concerts throughout Spain. Her first album Subo, bajo was released in October 2018.

== Filmography ==
=== Television ===
- Special Amar en tiempos revueltos: Flores para Belle, as Belle (2008)
- La chica de ayer, as Rosa de Santos (2009)
- La Señora, as Carlota de Castro Santibáñez (2009)
- La piel azul, as Sophie. Miniseries (2010)
- Hispania, la leyenda, as Helena (2010–2012)
- Infames, as Irene Simón/Isabel Rouge, one episode (2012)
- Velvet, as Luisa Rivas (2014–2015)
- High Seas, as Louisa/Sofía Plazaola (2019–2020)
- El Ministerio del Tiempo, as Carolina Bravo (2020)
- Memento Mori (2023)

=== Feature films ===
- Caótica Ana, as Ana. Dir. Julio Medem (2007)
- Camino, as Nuria. Dir. Javier Fesser (2008)
- Kidnapped, as Isa. Dir. Miguel Ángel Vivas (2010)
- Retornos, as Mar. Dir. Luis Avilés (2010)
- Buscando a Eimish, as Eimish. Dir. Ana Rodríguez Rosell (2012)
- Somos gente honrada, as Julia. Dir. Alejandro Marzoa (2013)
- Al final todos mueren, as Noelia. Dir. David Galán Galindo, Roberto Pérez Toledo, Pablo Vara, Javier Botet, and Javier Fesser (2013)
- The Bride, as a girl. Dir. Paula Ortiz (2015)
- Lobos sucios, as Candela. Dir. Simón Casal de Miguel (2015)
- Las siete muertes, as Clara. Dir. Gerardo Herrero (2017)
- Muse, as Beatriz. Dir. Jaume Balagueró (2017)
- Alegría tristeza, as Luna. Dir. Ibon Cormenzana (2018)
- La influencia, as Alicia. Dir. Denis Rovira van Boekholt (2019)

=== Short films ===
- La unión, as Sara. Dir. Carlos A. Sambricio (2009)
- Lo siento, te quiero, as Bárbara. Dir. Leticia Dolera (2009)
- Avevamo vent'anni, as Sara. Dir. Ivan Silvestrini (2010)
- El orden de las cosas, as Julia. Dir. César Esteban Alenda and José Esteban Alenda (2010)
- Amor sacro, as Lucía. Dir. Javier Yáñez Sanz (2011)
- The Room, cast. Dir. Miguel Ángel Vivas (2011)
- Inertial Love, as a girl. Dir. César Esteban Alenda and José Esteban Alenda (2012)
- Hibernation, as Claire Martínez. Dir. Jon Mikel Caballero (2012)
- Solsticio, as Marina. Dir. Juan Francisco Viruega (2013)
- Hay dos clases de personas, as She. Dir. Eva Moreno and Juan Carlos Vellido (2013)
- 1:58, cast. Dir. Rodrigo Cortés (2014)
- IPDENTICAL: Imagine a world without creativity, Dir. Marco Huertas (2018)

== Theater ==
- Amor Casual, by Nicolás Casariego. Dir. Nicolás Casariego (2012)
- The Trickster of Seville, by Tirso de Molina, as Tisbea. Dir. Darío Facal (2015)
- Punk&Love, by Pedro Cantalejo. Dir Darío Facal (2017)

== Awards and nominations ==
- 2010: Nominated for the Mestre Mateo Award for Best Female Lead Performance, for Retornos
- 2010: Vila International Short Film Festival award for Best Female Performance, for El orden de las cosas
- 2010: Nominated for the Luna de Islantilla award for Best Actress, for El orden de las cosas
