= Sister Death =

- Promotional release poster
- Spanish: Hermana Muerte
- Directed by: Paco Plaza
- Written by: Jorge Guerricaechevarría; Paco Plaza
- Produced by: Enrique López Lavigne; Diego Suárez Chialvo; Pablo Cruz
- Starring: Aria Bedmar; Maru Valdivielso; Luisa Merelas; Almudena Amor; Chelo Vivares; Sara Roch; Olimpia Roch; Adriana Camarena; Martina Delgado; Claudia Fernández Arroyo
- Cinematography: Daniel Fernández Abelló
- Edited by: Martí Roca; Guillermo de la Cal
- Music by: Mikel Salas
- Production company: El Estudio
- Distributed by: Netflix
- Release dates: 5 October 2023 (Sitges); 27 October 2023 (Spain)
- Country: Spain
- Language: Spanish

Sister Death (Spanish: Hermana Muerte) is a 2023 Spanish supernatural horror film directed by Paco Plaza and written by Jorge Guerricaechevarría and Plaza which stars Aria Bedmar. A prequel to the 2017 film Verónica, the plot follows the paranormal experiences of a novice (Bedmar) enrolled as a teacher in a convent operating a girls school in 1940s Spain.

The film world premiered as the opener of the 56th Sitges Film Festival on 5 October 2023 and was subsequently released on Netflix on 27 October 2023.

== Plot ==
In 1939 Spain, a young girl is revered by the townsfolk for her seemingly holy visions. Ten years later, Narcisa arrives at a convent that has been reformed into a school for girls following the Red Terror during the Spanish Civil War. Narcisa is greeted by Sister Julia and the Mother Superior; the latter of whom is enthused to have the "holy girl" from the news, who inspired the community, among their ranks. The Mother Superior explains to Narcisa that she will take over the duty of teaching the girls, which had previously belonged to Sister Inés, who had earlier left the convent.

In her new room, Narcisa discovers a cigar box with letters, scissors, and a funerary photograph of Sister Socorro. Not long after her arrival, Narcisa begins to experience horrific nightmares and inexplicable supernatural phenomena: a chair repeatedly falls on its own in her room; an incomplete hangman drawing appears on her wall; and one of her students is frightened by Narcisa simply writing her name on the blackboard. At confession, Narcisa admits her insecurities regarding her supernatural gifts and her faith.

One night, two girls find the scissors from the cigar box in the bathroom, and have a supernatural encounter. However, Sister Julia dismisses their concerns, and punishes one of the girls, Rosa, for causing trouble. Narcisa visits Rosa in confinement for answers. Rosa explains that the convent is haunted by an entity they refer to as "the girl", and that if one's name is written by the spirit on the blackboard, they are cursed, explaining why Sister Inés had fled.

While Narcisa lectures the girls on an upcoming solar eclipse, Rosa's name appears written on the blackboard. Narcisa seeks to communicate with the spirit and asks Rosa for help; together, the two of them complete the hangman drawing. Rosa notices a spirit behind Narcisa before she vanishes. Frantically searching the convent for her student, Narcisa has a disturbing paranormal encounter in the confessional booth before finding Rosa hanged behind the lattice.

While the others mourn Rosa, Sister Julia blames Narcisa for her death. Narcisa decides to leave the convent, but is caught under the solar eclipse. She looks at it, which blinds her eyes, and she goes into a trance and witnesses the plunder and sexual violence that befell the convent during the war.

Narcisa is returned to the convent for treatment; in her room, the spirit of Sister Socorro appears. Through visions, Narcisa learns that Socorro was raped during the war and conceived a daughter, whom the other nuns decided to keep concealed within the convent. When the child fell ill some years later, Socorro insisted on taking her to a hospital. The nuns, wanting the child's existence to remain a secret, locked Socorro in her room while taking the child to the bathroom; while struggling to force Socorro's daughter into the bath to lower her fever, the child fatally hit her head on the tub. Upon realizing her daughter had died, Socorro hanged herself in what would become Narcisa's room. Narcisa unleashes Socorro's spirit, which exacts its vengeance on Sister Julia and the Mother Superior, killing them both. The spirits of Socorro and her daughter reunite in the bathroom.

Decades later, the now-elderly Sister Narcisa is introduced to her new class, some of whom mockingly call her "Sister Death". There, Narcisa encounters student Verónica.

== Cast ==
- Aria Bedmar as Narcisa
- Almudena Amor as Hermana Socorro
- Maru Valdivielso as Hermana Julia
- Luisa Merelas as Madre Superiora ('Mother Superior')
- Chelo Vivares as Hermana Sagrario
- Sara Roch as Rosa
- Olimpia Roch as Elvirita
- Adriana Camarena as Ana María
- Martina Delgado as Marina
- Claudia Fernández Arroyo
- Consuelo Trujillo as Hermana Muerte
- Sandra Escacena as Verónica

== Production ==
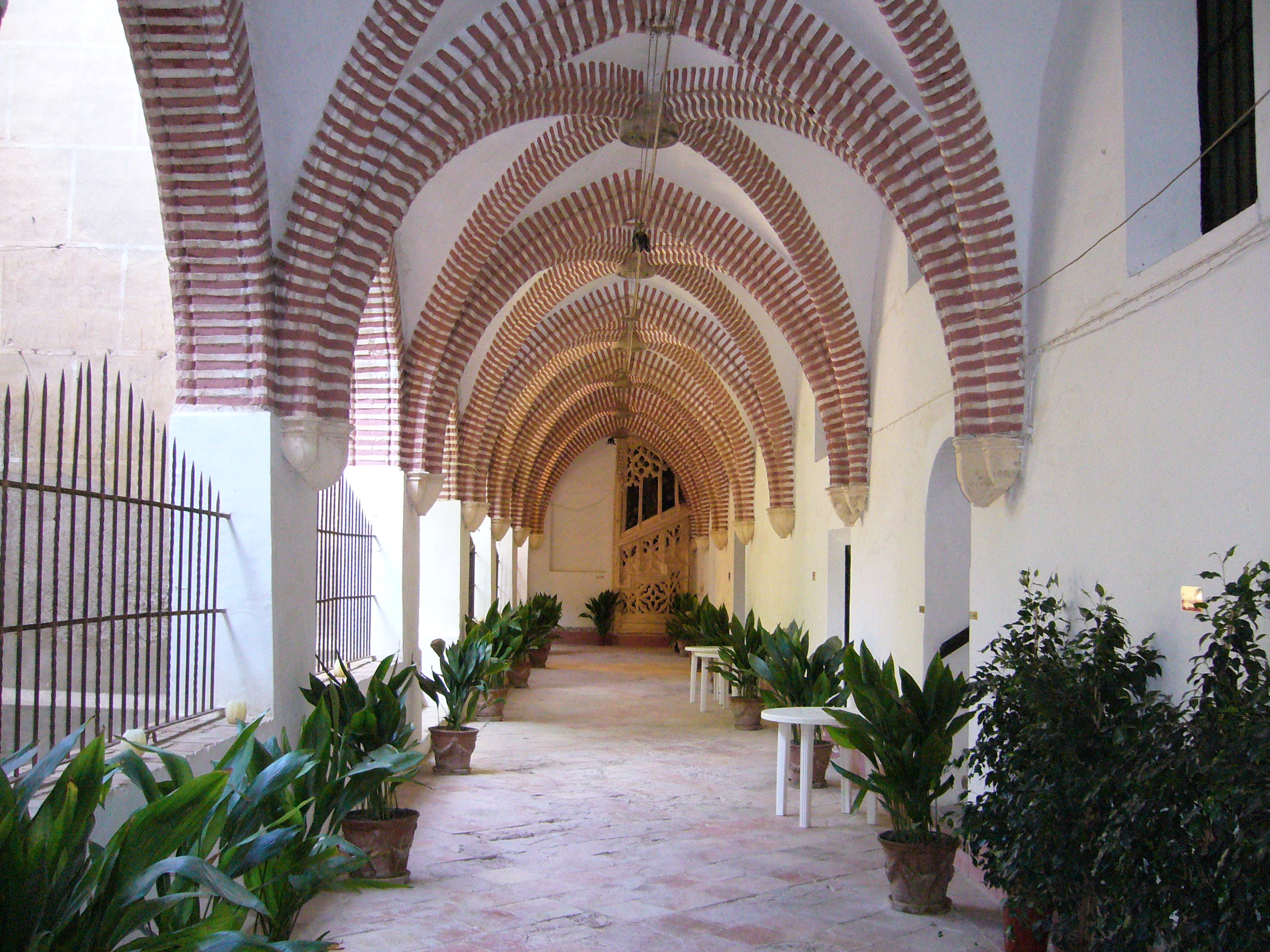
The Monastery of Sant Jeroni de Cotalba was used to portray the fictional setting of the convent and girls school.

The film was written by Jorge Guerricaechevarría and Paco Plaza. The film is an El Estudio production. Filming began in the Valencia region in March 2022. The Monastery of Sant Jeroni de Cotalba was chosen as shooting location to portray the school and convent where the fiction takes place. Enrique López Lavigne, Pablo Cruz and Diego Suarez Chialvo took over production duties, whereas Daniel F. Abelló did so with cinematography, Guillermo de la Cal and Martí Roca with editing, Laia Ateca with art direction and Alberto Álvarez with production supervision.

== Release ==
The film was presented as the opening film of the 56th Sitges Film Festival on 5 October 2023. It was distributed by Netflix, with a streaming release set for 27 October 2023.

== Reception ==
According to the American review aggregation website Rotten Tomatoes, Sister Death has an 88% approval rating based on 16 reviews from critics, with an average rating of 7.2/10.

Miguel Ángel Romero of Cinemanía rated the film 4 out of 5 stars, underscoring Plaza's consolidation as a master of Spanish horror cinema as a verdict.

Jesse Hassenger of Decider.com gave the film a positive recommendation, deeming it to be "an efficient and well-made horror picture".

Elsa Fernández-Santos of El País assesses that Plaza delivers one of his best films owing to a staging combining a "Gothic tale background with Spartan architecture and an aura of fierce fatality and martyrdom", writing that the film is built "with visual elements that are as simple as they are disturbing".

Sister Death has been classified in Collider as a nunsploitation film.

=== Top ten lists ===
The film appeared on a number of critics' top ten lists of the best Spanish films of 2023:

- 5th — El Periódico de Catalunya (critics)
- 7th — El Confidencial (consensus)

== Accolades ==
Year	Award	Category	Nominee(s)	Result	Ref.
2024	11th Feroz Awards	Best Poster	Iñaki Villuendas, José Haro	Nominated	

== See also ==
- List of Spanish films of 2023
