= List of films featuring eclipses =

There is a body of films featuring stellar eclipses and eclipses of natural satellites. Compared to other astronomical events featured in films, such as full moons and asteroid strikes, solar eclipses are less commonly seen. When they have featured in films, they often drive the plot and have a portentous presence. NPR's Glen Weldon said that films use eclipses "to signal to audiences that the normal rules have temporarily lifted, and things are about to get weird". The first film to feature a solar eclipse was the 1907 silent film The Eclipse, or the Courtship of the Sun and Moon that featured a solar eclipse as a fantastical consummation between the Sun and the Moon. Eclipses have been seen as bad omens throughout history, so filmmakers leverage that belief "as visual cues or key plot points", according to The Oregonian's Amy Wang. The most accurate depiction of a solar eclipse in film is seen in the 1961 religious epic film Barabbas due to the filming of an actual solar eclipse during its crucifixion scene (see solar eclipse of February 15, 1961).

== List of films ==
Film	Year	Description
2001: A Space Odyssey	1968	The American science fiction film's opening sequence shows an eclipse of the Sun by both the Earth and the Moon. The three bodies and the camera (which is farther out in space) are aligned; the sequence starts with the Sun fully eclipsed to the camera, and shows the eclipse ending and the Sun becoming visible past the Earth and Moon.
Almanach 1999-2000	1999	The Canadian documentary film explores divination in a humorous way and includes eclipses as part of its subject matter.
Ambuli	2012	The Tamil-language paranormal film features a monster that was born when a pregnant woman living in a village went outside during a solar eclipse, despite her people's beliefs, and gave birth.
Angela's Ashes	1999	The night before the protagonist leaves Ireland to emigrate to America, his family witnesses a lunar eclipse, and his uncle Pat tells him it is a sign of good luck.
Apocalypto	2006	The Yucatec Mayan-language action-adventure film, set in pre-Columbian Yucatan and Guatemala around the year 1511, Mayan leaders take advantage of a solar eclipse as a sign of an angry god whose blood thirst is satisfied by the leaders. The moon is shown as being near full, rather than as a new moon, on the night after the eclipse.
Avatar: The Way of Water	2022	An eclipse occurs during a pivotal moment in the final battle of the film.
Barabbas	1961	In the religious epic film about Barabbas, a solar eclipse takes place during a crucifixion scene. A real eclipse was filmed for the scene (see solar eclipse of February 15, 1961).
Bloody Birthday	1981	In the American horror film's opening, three children are born during a solar eclipse, which leads them to grow up with violent personalities.
A Connecticut Yankee in King Arthur's Court	1949	The American film, based on Mark Twain's 1889 novel A Connecticut Yankee in King Arthur's Court, features an American protagonist from 1912 who wakes up in Arthurian Britain in AD 528 and uses his knowledge of an upcoming solar eclipse to his advantage.
Darkness	2002	The English-language horror film features a house that was built for a supernatural ritual to sacrifice seven children for a solar eclipse that happens every forty years.
Dolores Claiborne	1995	In the American psychological thriller film, a housekeeper is sent home by her boss to witness a solar eclipse. In the midst of the eclipse, she confronts her abusive and alcoholic husband.
Dragonslayer	1981	The American fantasy film features the climactic battle with a dragon during a solar eclipse.
Dune: Part Two	2024	In the science fiction film's opening scene, a solar eclipse occurs during the Fremen's ambush of hostile Sardaukar troops.
Eclipse	1994	The Canadian drama film features a kid who films a documentary about an upcoming solar eclipse.
The Eclipse, or the Courtship of the Sun and Moon	1907	The French silent film shows a solar eclipse resulting from a consummation between the Sun and the Moon.
Fantasia	1940	In one of the segments of the American animated film, a solar eclipse takes place after dinosaurs go extinct, and the landscape is changed into a sea.
Farinelli	1994	The biographical drama film, set in 18th-century Europe, features a scene of singing during a solar eclipse.
From Dusk Till Dawn 2: Texas Blood Money	1999	Vampires in a criminal gang raid a bank and attack people they find one night. Dawn appears to defeat them, but a solar eclipse turns the tide turns back in their favor.
Gerald's Game	2017	The American psychological horror film, based on Stephen King's novel Gerald's Game, features a solar eclipse in a memory flashback in which the female main character, a preteen at the time, is sexually assaulted.
Hellboy	2004	In the American superhero film, Hellboy has to open a gate to hell during a lunar eclipse.
The House of the Devil	2009	The American horror film, set in the 1980s, features a small-town university student who is hired to stay at a house in the middle of nowhere to take care of an old woman on the night of a full lunar eclipse.
Judy Berlin	1999	In the American drama film, the town of Babylon, New York experiences an hours-long solar eclipse, and it affects the world of the characters who wander the streets in memory and in search of meaning to their suburban lives.
The Kid Who Would Be King	2019	The English-language fantasy film features a solar eclipse that fully empowers the wicked sorceress Morgana.
King Solomon's Mines	1937	The British adventure film features in its climax one of the protagonists predicting a solar eclipse to their advantage.
A Knight in Camelot	1998	The American television film features a scientist who is zapped back to the time of King Arthur, and she predicts a solar eclipse to avoid being burned at the stake.
Ladyhawke	1985	The ending of this American medieval fantasy film, set in 13th-century Europe, features a solar eclipse foretold by a divine riddle. It brings an end to an infernal curse.
The Land Before Time X: The Great Longneck Migration	2003	The American animated family film about dinosaurs features a solar eclipse whose occurrence scares off predators.
Lara Croft: Tomb Raider	2001	The English-language action-adventure film features a solar eclipse as part of a rare planetary alignment that allows access to a relic that can control space and time.
Little Shop of Horrors	1986	In the American horror comedy film, the monstrous houseplant Audrey II appears during a solar eclipse.
Little Sinner	1935	Episode of the Our Gang series. When a solar eclipse creates confusion, two white boys escape church to go fishing. They come across a black church revival whose members are also confused, and afraid. Professor Lisa Yaszek said of the racist depiction, "Apparently somehow these black Americans don't know what an eclipse is, so they have that very stereotypical reaction of confusion and fear, which causes chaos for the boys... the way it plays out is so stereotypical and really horrible."
Matador	1986	A Spanish movie about a male and a female serial killer, and a young boy that is mentally connected to them. During a total exclipse he is able to lead the police to them, but they kill themselves during the eclipse as they reach sexual climax.
Perfect Strangers	2017	The Spanish dark comedy film features a dinner party that takes place on the night of a lunar eclipse.
Pharaoh	1966	In the Polish production, with the story set in Ancient Egypt, Egyptian priests use the occurrence of a solar eclipse to subdue the crowds.
Pitch Black	2000	In the American science fiction film, a criminal and other people trapped on a desert planet have to evade underground predatory creatures who go above ground when an eclipse occurs.
Rogue One: A Star Wars Story	2016	In the Star Wars film, the Death Star–a spherical space station–briefly causes a solar eclipse over the holy city of Jedha shortly before firing on the city.
Sister Death	2023	In the supernatural horror film, a prequel to the 2017 film Verónica, a nun stares at a solar eclipse and damages her eyesight and eventually goes blind by Verónica.
The Seventh Sign	1988	The American horror film, which focuses on the Book of Revelation and a battle over an unborn child, features a solar eclipse as a key plot device.
Verónica	2017	In 1991 Madrid, while the rest of her classmates watch the solar eclipse of July 11, 1991, a teenager becomes possessed by a demon after using a Ouija board. In reality, the eclipse was not visible anywhere in Europe.
The Watcher in the Woods	1980	The American young-adult horror film features the mystery of a girl who disappears in the woods of New England decades ago and concludes with a climactic scene featuring a solar eclipse.
The Wild Thornberrys Movie	2002	The American animated family film features a solar eclipse at the film's climax.
Wolf Creek	2005	In the Australian horror film features a solar eclipse during a serial killer's pursuit of a victim. Peter Shelley wrote in Australian Horror Films, 1973-2010, "The solar eclipse that is shown adds a yin-yang element to the treatment. The shadow over [the victim] Ben and a dark profile of the Swedish backpacker wearing a Mick-type hat creates the expectation of [the serial killer] Mick finding him."
