= Therica Wilson-Read =

English actress

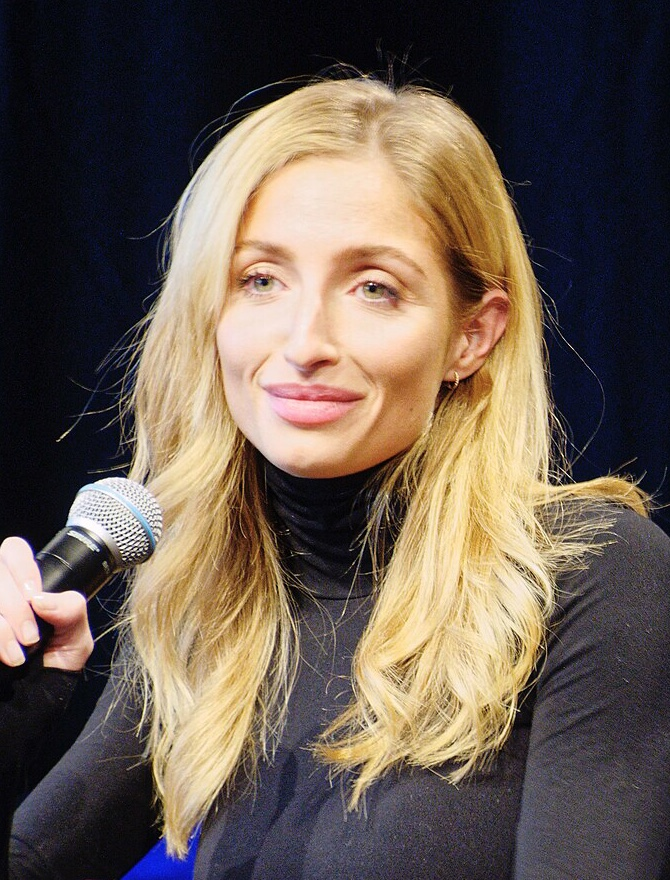
- Wilson-Read at 2022 Comic-Con Germany Stuttgart
- Born: Therica Alice Wilson-Read; 12 August 1993 (age 32)
- Years active: 2014–present

Therica Alice Wilson-Read (born August 12, 1993) is an English actress. She is most notable for her roles as Sabrina Glevissig in the Netflix television series The Witcher (2019–2024), and as Polly in the film Stopmotion (2023). Other credits include Young Wallander (2020), Coyote (2023) and Back to Black (2024).

== Early life ==
Wilson-Read was born in the North London Borough of Camden. When she was young, Wilson-Read expressed interest in pursuing Law or Psychology, however she attended Drama school at the suggestion of her mother as she always loved acting.

== Career ==
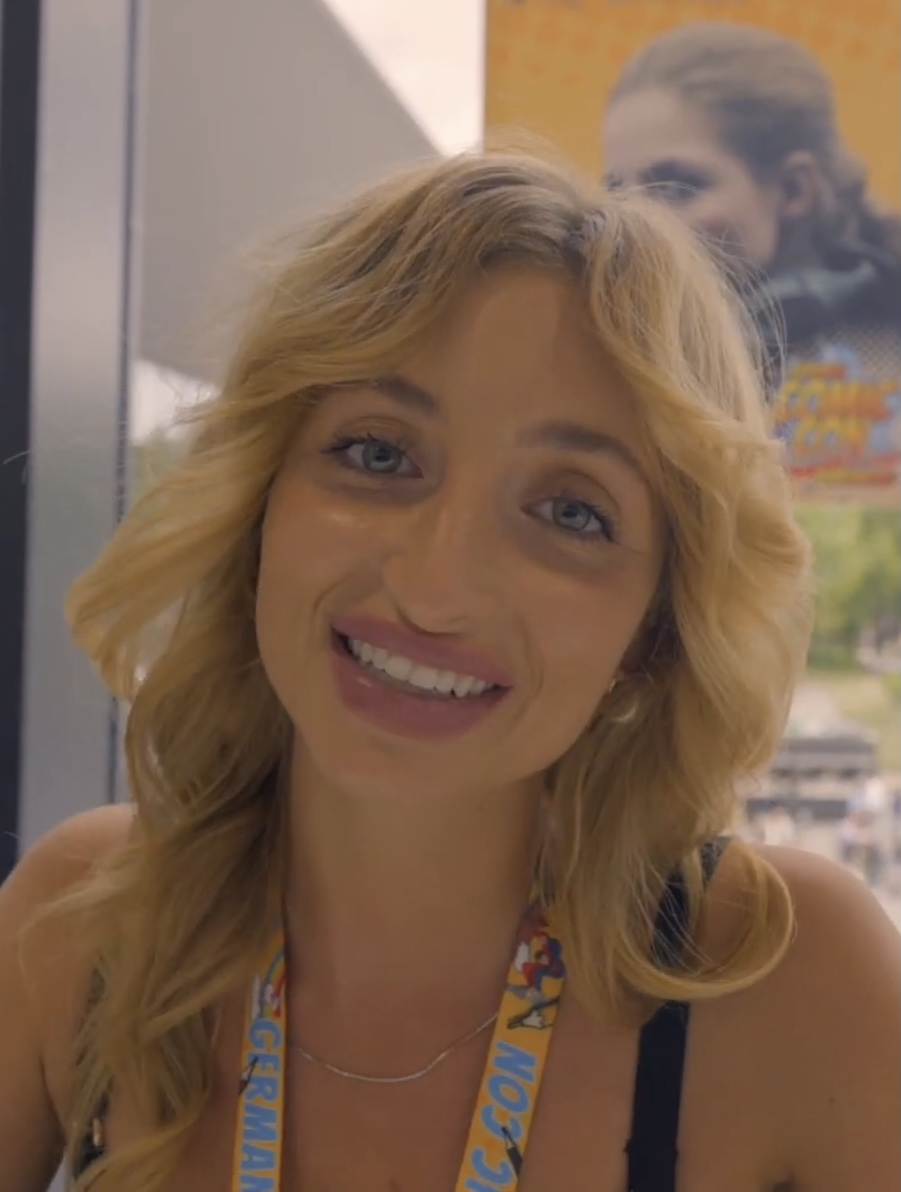
Wilson-Read in 2021

In 2019 she was cast in the Netflix television series The Witcher as Sabrina Glevissig, a sorceress in the Brotherhood of Sorcerers. Wilson-Read described her character as "powerful, feisty, opinionated and influential in the political arena" and remarked that playing Sabrina has helped bring out her own personal confidence. She appeared at the September 2023 ACME Comic Con as a notable guest in support of the show.

In 2023, she played the lead role in the film Coyote, a love story set in a human trafficking ring in a dystopian future setting. Wilson-Read was nominated for best actress for her performance as the protagonist at the Unrestricted View Film Festival Awards 2024. In 2023, she played a main role as Polly, alongside Aisling Franciosi, in the Robert Morgan directed psychological horror film Stopmotion (2023).

In 2024, she appeared as Becky in the 2024 Amy Winehouse biographical drama film Back to Black.

== Personal life ==
On 23 August 2025, Wilson-Read announced that she was expecting a child. Her child was born in late November 2025.

== Filmography ==
=== Film ===
Year	Title	Role	Notes
2016	Fred	Melissa	Short
2016	Waiting Game	Becky	Short film; also writer
2016	Fox Trap	Anna	
2017	Sinners	Kanthana (Vampire Queen)	
2017	Tony	Daisy	
2017	Suicide Club	Kelly Resznick	
2018	Profile	Kelly	
2018	Surfactant	Jo	Short
2023	Coyote	Ekaterina	
2023	Stopmotion	Polly	
2024	Back to Black	Becky	

=== Television ===
Year	Title	Role	Notes
2019–present	The Witcher	Sabrina Glevessig	10 episodes
2020	Young Wallander	Helena	1 episode

== Awards and nominations ==
Year	Award	Category	Work	Result	Ref
2024	Unrestricted View Film Festival Awards	Best Actress	Coyote	Nominated	
