= Kidnapped (2010 film) =

2010 film directed by Miguel Ángel Vivas

- Film poster
- Spanish: Secuestrados
- Directed by: Miguel Ángel Vivas
- Written by: Javier García; Miguel Ángel Vivas
- Produced by: Emma Lustres Gómez; Borja Pena
- Starring: Fernando Cayo; Manuela Vellés; Ana Wagener; Guillermo Barrientos; Dritan Biba; Martijn Kuiper; Xoel Yáñez
- Cinematography: Pedro J. Márquez
- Edited by: José Manuel Jiménez
- Music by: Sergio Moure
- Production companies: Vaca Films; Blur Producciones; Attic Films; La Fabrique 2
- Distributed by: Vértice Cine (es)
- Release dates: 25 September 2010 (Fantastic Fest); 25 February 2011 (Spain)
- Running time: 85 minutes
- Countries: Spain; France
- Language: Spanish
- Budget: €100,000

Kidnapped (Spanish: Secuestrados) is a 2010 horror-thriller film directed by Miguel Ángel Vivas and written by Javier García, which stars Fernando Cayo, Manuela Vellés, and Ana Wagener alongside Guillermo Barrientos, Dritan Biba, Martijn Kuiper and Zoel Yáñez.

== Plot ==
Jaime, his wife Marta and their daughter Isa have just moved into a new home. Isa has plans to attend a party with her boyfriend while Marta and Jaime are arguing about how to raise their daughter. In the midst of this, three masked thieves break in. They are from the moving crew and in the film credits are listed as Head Thief, Young Thief, and Strong Thief.

Head Thief takes Jaime to a bank machine several miles away from home, while the other two stay with the mother and daughter. He tells Jaime that if there is any deviation from the plan, or if he tries to alert anyone to his predicament, he will call the house and have the other two kill Marta. Jaime takes the risk, and tries to convince a woman at the bank machine to call the police, but she believes he's trying to rob her, and gives him all her money. This causes Head Thief to call the house and tell Strong Thief to do whatever he wants to Marta. Jaime, hearing Marta's screams over the phone, begs Head Thief to give him another chance. Head Thief agrees and takes Jaime to another bank machine further away.

Meanwhile, César calls to pick up Isa for their date. Young Thief and Strong Thief pull him into the house, but find that Marta and Isa have fled to the basement and locked themselves in a back room. The men drag César downstairs and threaten to kill him unless the women open the door. When they don't, Strong Thief shoots César, injuring him, and breaks into the room with a sledgehammer, taking the women hostage again.

A security guard comes to the door to say that the neighbours have complained about the television being on too loud; he asks if he may come in and look around. Strong Thief pretends to be Marta's husband and, when the guard grows suspicious, slits his throat. Strong Thief then decides to rape Isa. Marta offers herself in Isa's place, but he laughs and breaks her arm. Young Thief, disgusted with all that has happened, pulls him off and the two men fight. When Strong Thief tries to rape Isa again, she grabs a statuette and crushes his head. Young Thief manages to talk her out of shooting him with Strong Thief's gun and leaves.

While this is happening, Jaime and Head Thief are in the car, driving around. The idea is for the clock to turn to the next day, so that Jaime can take out more money from the bank. Instead, Jaime speeds up and runs the car into a telephone pole, knocking himself and Head Thief unconscious. When Jaime comes to, he takes Head Thief's gun and returns home. He and Young Thief meet each other outside the house, but both are too traumatised and Young Thief escapes.

Jaime and Isa go to the basement and release Marta and César, who have been handcuffed together. Jaime gives the gun to Marta, then calls the police; while he is on the phone, Head Thief returns to the house and kills him with the sledgehammer. Marta tries to shoot Head Thief, but misses. He takes the gun from her and shoots her in the head. César comes up from the basement and Head Thief kills him too. Isa falls to her knees and stares at her mother in shock while he stabs her repeatedly in the stomach.

== Cast ==
- Fernando Cayo as Jaime
- Manuela Vellés as Isa
- Ana Wagener as Marta
- Guillermo Barrientos as Asaltante Joven
- Dritan Biba as Asaltante Jefe
- Martijn Kuiper as Asaltante Fuerte
- Xoel Yáñez as César
- Luis Iglesia as Javier
- Pepo Suevos as Guardia de Seguridad
- Eduardo Torroja as Conductor
- César Díaz as Encargado

== Production ==
Kidnapped was produced by Vaca Films alongside Blur, Attic and La Fabrique 2 (France), with participation of Filmanova Invest, Xunta de Galicia, TVG and Creative Europe's MEDIA. It was directed by Miguel Ángel Vivas. "The main theme of our film is terror – caused by fear and violence," explains the producer duo Borja Pena and Emma Lustre. "During the filming, we pay special attention to realism, so that the viewer experience the same emotions as our protagonists. The issue is quite relevant in our society." The film stars Fernando Cayo, Ana Wagener and Manuela Vellés. Blur Producciones began the filming on 22 February 2010 in Las Rozas. The film is particularly well known for consisting of only 12 long takes.

== Release ==
Distributed by Vértice Cine, the film premiered in Spain on 25 February 2011. The film had a UK and US release in spring 2011 as Kidnapped.

== See also ==
- List of Spanish films of 2011
- List of films featuring home invasions
