= Stopmotion (film) =

- Official release poster
- Directed by: Robert Morgan
- Written by: Robert Morgan; Robin King
- Produced by: Alain de la Mata; Christopher Granier-Deferre
- Starring: Aisling Franciosi
- Cinematography: Léo Hinstin
- Edited by: Aurora Vögeli
- Music by: Lola de la Mata
- Production companies: BFI blueLight
- Distributed by: IFC Films; Shudder
- Release dates: 24 September 2023 (Austin Fantastic Fest); 23 February 2024
- Running time: 94 minutes
- Country: United Kingdom
- Language: English
- Box office: $804,000

Stopmotion is a 2023 British live-action/adult animated psychological horror-thriller film directed by Robert Morgan in his feature-length debut, from a screenplay he wrote with Robin King.

The film stars Aisling Franciosi as a stop motion animator who becomes increasingly obsessed with a film she is working on. Stopmotion was released on 23 February 2024 to critical acclaim.

== Plot ==
Unable to use her hands due to arthritis, renowned stop-motion animator Suzanne Blake enlists her daughter Ella's help in completing her most recent film, often overworking and abusing Ella. When Suzanne suffers a stroke and falls comatose, Ella resolves to finish the film on her own.

Ella's boyfriend, Tom, invites her to live with him while Suzanne recovers, but Ella instead moves into a semi-abandoned apartment building managed by Tom to continue finishing the film. She encounters a young girl living in the same building who shows an interest in the film. She calls the story "boring" and presents Ella with a different story about a young girl lost in the woods. Ella discards the original project and begins working on the new film. The girl complains that the figures don't look real enough, insisting Ella use spoiled steak for the dolls to emulate flesh. Ella initially hesitates, then complies.

The girl states that the girl in the film is hiding from an entity called the "Ash Man". Ella creates a model of the Ash Man, but the girl dismisses it, insisting that he must be crafted out of "something dead," and takes Ella into the forest where they find a dead fox. Ella refuses to use it, and the girl withholds the rest of the story from Ella. Ella resolves to finish the story on her own, though a creative block ensues.

At a party, Ella asks Tom's sister Polly to give her some LSD, hoping it will inspire new ideas. Ella remakes the Ash Man puppet using the fox carcass, then envisions the Ash Man staring at her through her peephole, mirroring a segment from the film. Tom finds her passed out and wakes her. After she tells him what she saw, Tom notices recent animated Ash Man footage and tells Ella she must have been hallucinating. Ella finds the drugs Polly gave her in her shoe, still untouched. Ella goes with Tom to his flat but continues to have disturbing hallucinations.

Polly, also a stop-motion animator, sets Ella up with a job at the studio she works for. Ella accepts and starts crafting eyeballs for stop-motion figures. Taking a break, she wanders around the studio and discovers that Polly has plagiarised her film. Enraged, she argues with Polly and destroys the set Polly created. Ella visits her comatose mother and imagines she calls Ella a puppet who can't control her creation.

The little girl continues telling the story, stating that the Ash Man returns a second night and touches the girl, but Ella refuses to include it, instead declaring that the girl successfully escapes. After experiencing another hallucination of the Ash Man pursuing her in her apartment, Ella awakens in the hospital with an injured leg. She is visited by Tom, who tells her that the project has gone too far and that he will destroy her set and delete all of the footage. Ella panics and insists she do it, and Tom agrees on the condition that he accompany her. Ella then learns her mother has died.

Returning to her apartment, Ella strangles the girl to death only for her to reappear unharmed seconds later and comfort Ella as she cries. The girl demands that the Ash Man be remade with "something bleedy". Ella tears open the stitches on her leg and pulls out a strip of her own flesh. She is discovered by Tom and Polly, who attempt to restrain her and take her back to the hospital, but she attacks and kills them both and uses their flesh to create figures of the little girl and the Ash Man. The Ash Man stalks towards Ella and the girl, who fearfully proclaims "this isn't part of the story". Ella allows the Ash Man to eat from her face, now made of mortician's wax. Ella enters a cabin in the forest that looks like the one in the film she was making. There the girl is watching footage of Ella bleeding to death on her apartment floor. She tells Ella she loves the film. Ella smiles at her before stepping into a satin-lined trunk and closing the lid.

== Cast ==
- Aisling Franciosi as Ella Blake
- Stella Gonet as Suzanne
- Tom York as Tom
- Therica Wilson-Read as Polly
- Caoilinn Springall as Little Girl
- James Swanton as The Ash Man
- Joshua J. Parker as Will
- Jaz Hutchins as Brett
- Bridgitta Roy as Doctor

== Production ==
Ahead of the Cannes Film Market in June 2021, Wild Bunch International revealed the project by Robert Morgan, who will make the jump from short films to his directorial debut feature film from a script he wrote with Robin King. Aisling Franciosi was cast as the lead for the film. The film received the fourth largest amount of production funding from the British Film Institute for 2022, at £905,000.

Principal photography began in February 2022, and was completed by April.

== Release ==
Stopmotion had its world premiere at the 2023 Fantastic Fest in Austin, Texas on 24 September 2023. It was then screened at the 2023 BFI London Film Festival on 7 October 2023.

The film was released in select theaters in the United States on 23 February 2024 by IFC Films.

== Reception ==
=== Critical response ===
On the review aggregator website Rotten Tomatoes, 91% of 68 critics' reviews are positive, with an average rating of 7.4/10. The website's consensus reads: "Stopmotion takes the conflict between art and artist to chilling, visually thrilling extremes, distinguished by director Robert Morgan's excellent effects work." Metacritic, which uses a weighted average, assigned the film a score of 65 out of 100, based on 11 critics, indicating "generally favorable" reviews.

In a positive review, Meagan Navarro of Bloody Disgusting wrote, "When so many filmmakers opt for style over substance, the style is substance here. Morgan surprises with an immersive sensory assault. Art and storytelling collide in breathtaking yet revolting fashion. Morgan's knockout debut opens up the veins of a turbulent artist, delivering one creepy melding of mediums to an unsettling, powerful degree." Variety's Dennis Harvey wrote, "Robert Morgan unquestionably has a knack for the extraordinary; it is both a measure of his talent and of its limits that this debut feature stumbles only when it tries to do something on the ordinary side." The New York Times's Jeannette Catsoulis said, "Like the art form it celebrates, Stopmotion is careful, patient and almost punishingly focused, with Franciosi bringing the same intensity that made her role in The Nightingale (2018) so devastating."

In a more negative review, Peter Sobczynski of RogerEbert.com wrote, "Although it clearly wants to be seen as some kind of wild hallucinatory exploration into the heart of madness, Stopmotion eventually reveals itself to be little more than a collection of barf-bag visuals and tired conventions that are occasionally enlivened by some nifty animation and the strong performance from Franciosi." Steven Scaife of Slant Magazine wrote, "beyond the methodical scenes of Ella at work, the live-action sequences that dominate the film add little to the lengthy history of horror stories about someone slowly unraveling in isolation... It's as if the film's plot is puppeteered by earlier horror films, and in a similar fashion to the initial scene of Ella dutifully following her mother's instructions."

=== Accolades ===
In the main competition at the 2023 Fantastic Fest, Morgan won Best Director for his work on Stopmotion. It was also awarded the Special Jury Award in the Official Fantàstic Selection at the 56th Sitges Film Festival in Catalonia, Spain.
