= Almudena Amor =

Spanish actress

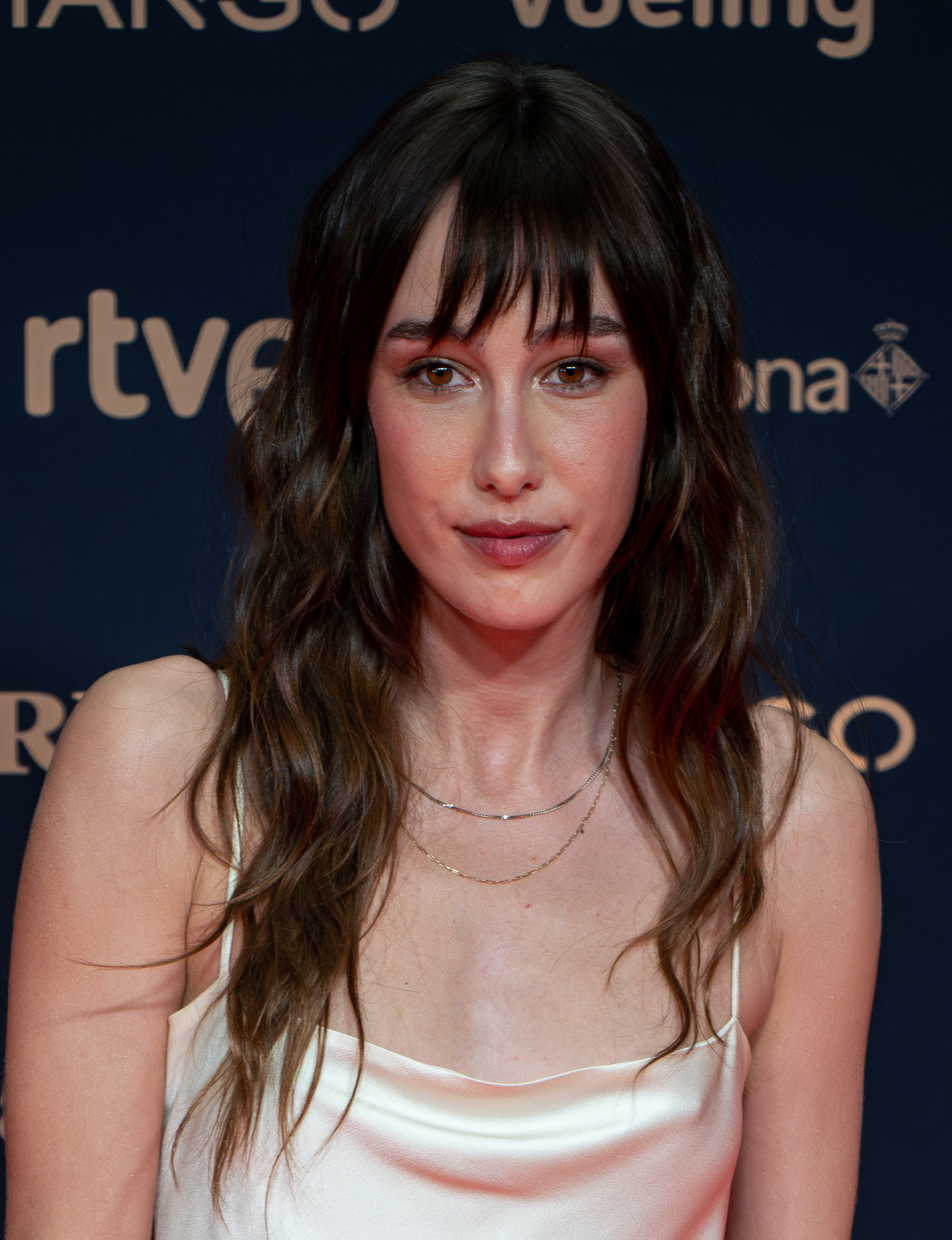
- Amor in 2026
- Born: Almudena Parejo Amor; 30 March 1994 (age 32); Madrid, Spain
- Occupation: Actress

Almudena Parejo Amor (born 30 March 1994) is a Spanish actress. She has starred in the films The Good Boss and The Grandmother.

== Early life and education ==
Almudena Parejo Amor was born on 30 March 1994 in Madrid. Part of her family comes from Lagartera (Toledo), a village in which she spent many summers and weekends during her youth.

Raised in the Concepción neighborhood, she developed an interest in acting during some theatrical courses organised in her high school in Ciudad Lineal. She trained her acting chops in Carabanchel at the Mar Navarro acting school. She earned a degree in publicity and a master's degree in design.

== Career ==
She worked for a time as a model afterwards. Determined to develop an acting career, she performed in some short films, commercials and music videos. After performing in a teaser video by Gonzaga Manso titled Millones de años, she was inked by agent Diana Ellerker, and she ensuingly landed the leading role in Paco Plaza's The Grandmother, playing the role of Susana, a young model who has to return home to take care of her grandmother. She also made a minor appearance in the Plaza-directed episode "Freddy" from the anthology television series Stories to Stay Awake. Her breakthrough role as Liliana (a young company intern from a well-off family infatuated with the boss) in Fernando León de Aranoa's The Good Boss earned her a nomination to the Goya Award for Best New Actress and a nomination to the Feroz Award for Best Supporting Actress in a Film.

== Filmography ==
Film

Key
†	Denotes films that have not yet been released

Year	Title	Role	Notes	Ref.
2021	El buen patrón (The Good Boss)	Liliana		
2021	La abuela (The Grandmother)	Susana		
2023	Hermana Muerte (Sister Death)	Hermana Socorro		
2024	La mujer dormida (The Sleeping Woman)	Ana		
2025	V/H/S/Halloween	Abogada	Segment: "Ut Supra Sic Infra"	
2025	Pose	Jemima		
TBA	Ancestral †	TBA		

Television

Year	Title	Role	Notes	Ref.
2023	El silencio (Muted)	Ana Dussuel	Main role	

== Accolades ==
Year	Award	Category	Work	Result	Ref.
2022	9th Feroz Awards	Best Supporting Actress (film)	The Good Boss	Nominated	
2022	77th CEC Medals	Best New Actress	The Good Boss	Won	
2022	36th Goya Awards	Best New Actress	The Good Boss	Nominated	
2022	30th Actors and Actresses Union Awards	Best New Actress	The Good Boss	Won	
2022	9th Platino Awards	Best Supporting Actress	The Good Boss	Nominated	
