= Semen, A Love Story =

- Theatrical release poster
- Spanish: Semen, una historia de amor
- Directed by: Daniela Fejerman; Inés París
- Screenplay by: Daniela Fejerman; Inés París
- Produced by: César Benítez
- Starring: Ernesto Alterio; Leticia Dolera; Héctor Alterio; María Pujalte; María Isbert
- Cinematography: Néstor Calvo
- Edited by: Iván Aledo
- Music by: Christopher Slaski
- Production companies: BocaBoca Producciones; Future Films Limited
- Distributed by: DeAPlaneta (es)
- Release dates: 28 April 2005 (Málaga); 15 July 2005 (Spain)
- Countries: Spain; United Kingdom
- Language: Spanish

Semen, A Love Story (Spanish: Semen, una historia de amor) is a 2005 Spanish-British screwball comedy film directed and written by Daniela Fejerman and Inés París} which stars Ernesto Alterio and Leticia Dolera alongside Héctor Alterio.

== Plot ==
Artificial insemination clinic neurotic worker Serafín falls in love with trapeze artist Ariadna (client of the centre) and decides to use his own sperm to inseminate her.

== Cast ==
- Ernesto Alterio as Serafín
- Leticia Dolera as Ariadna / Penélope
- Héctor Alterio as Emilio
- María Pujalte
- María Isbert

== Production ==
The film is a Spanish-British co-production by BocaBoca Producciones and Future Films Limited, and it had the participation of TVE and Canal+.

== Release ==
The film was presented in April 2005 at the Málaga Film Festival. Distributed by DeAPlaneta, the film was released theatrically in Spain on 15 July 2005.

== Critical reception ==
Jonathan Holland of Variety assessed that "witty premise" notwithstanding, the film quickly "becomes a standard, lab-produced screwballer badly in need of a heart".

Mirito Torreiro of Fotogramas rated the film 3 out of 5 stars highlighting the Alterio & Alterio duo as the best thing about the film.

== See also ==
- List of Spanish films of 2005
