= Carlos Álvarez-Nóvoa =

Spanish actor (1940–2015)

Carlos Álvarez
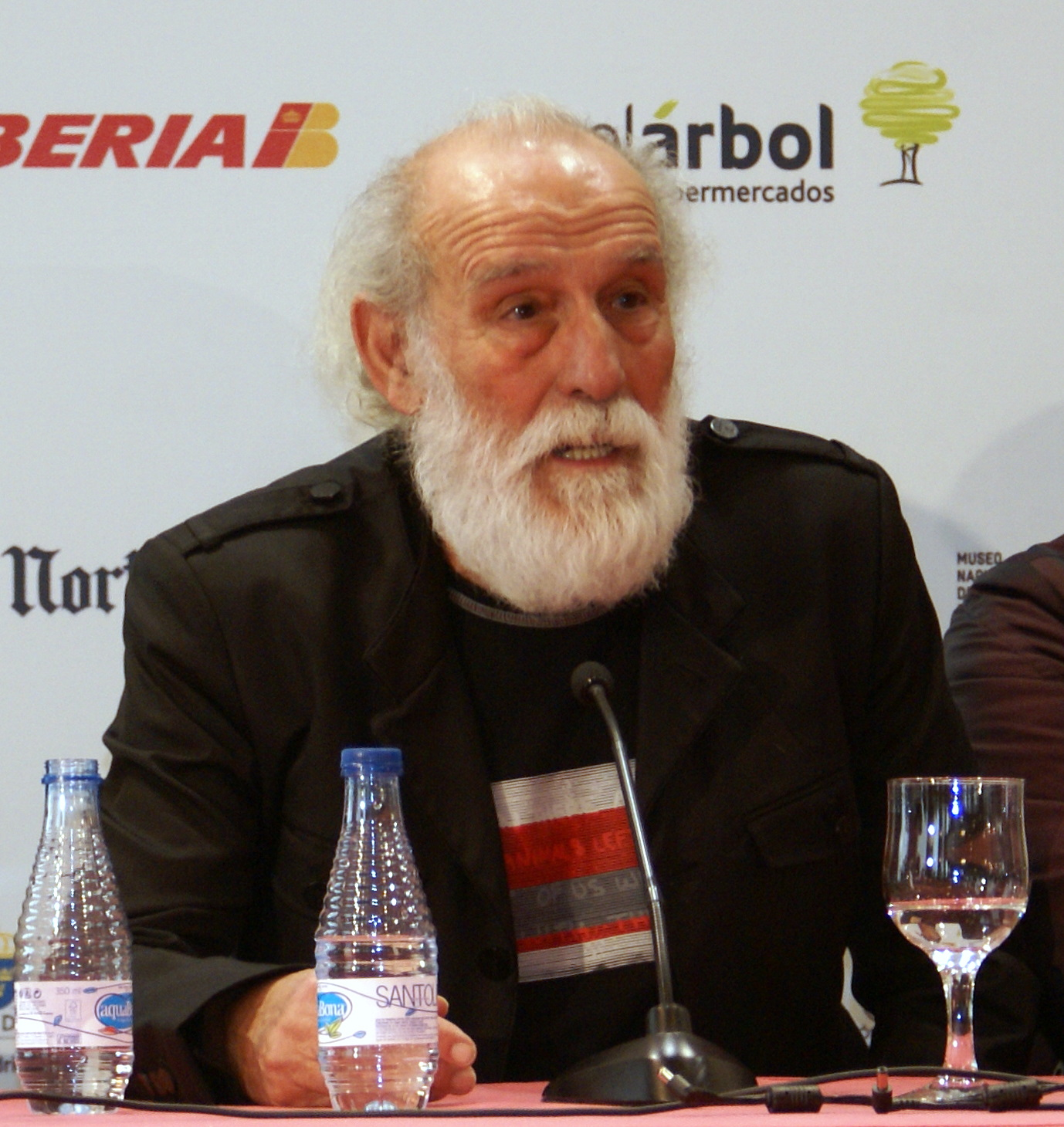
- Carlos Álvarez in 2011
- Born: Carlos Álvarez-Nóvoa Sánchez; 1940; La Felguera, Langreo
- Died: 23 September 2015 (aged 75); Sevilla
- Occupation(s): Writer, professor and actor

Carlos Álvarez-Nóvoa Sánchez (1940 in La Felguera – 23 September 2015) was a Spanish theatre director, writer, actor and lecturer. He won the 2000 Goya award for Best New Actor for his performance as Vecino in Solas. He died on 23 September 2015 from lung cancer at the age of 75.

== Selected filmography ==
Film
| Year | Title | Role | Notes |
|---|---|---|---|
| 1997 | Lucía, Lucía | | |
| 1999 | Solas | | |
| 2002 | Magic Bay | | |
| 2005 | Elsa & Fred | | |
| 2011 | Chrysalis | | |
| 2015 | The Bride | Padre | |
| 2015 | Carlos, rey emperador | Leonardo da Vinci | TV series |
