= Pose (film) =

- Theatrical release poster
- Directed by: Jamie Adams
- Written by: Jamie Adams
- Produced by: Shaun Sanghani; Cara Shine Ballarini; Rebecca Miller
- Starring: James McAvoy; Lucas Bravo; Leila Farzad; Almudena Amor; Aisling Franciosi
- Cinematography: Jan Vrhovnik
- Edited by: Matt Platts-Mills
- Music by: John Meirion Rea
- Production companies: SSS Film Capital; SSS Entertainment; Good Pals
- Distributed by: Vertical (United States); Altitude Film Distribution (United Kingdom)
- Release dates: November 12, 2025 (TBNFF); December 12, 2025 (United States)
- Running time: 80 minutes
- Countries: United States; United Kingdom
- Language: English

Pose is a 2025 thriller film written and directed by Jamie Adams. The film stars James McAvoy, Lucas Bravo, Aisling Franciosi, Leila Farzad and Almudena Amor.

== Cast ==
- James McAvoy as Thomas
- Lucas Bravo as Peter
- Leila Farzad as Dolly
- Almudena Amor as Jemima
- Aisling Franciosi as Patricia

== Production ==
On October 31, 2023, a thriller film starring James McAvoy, Lucas Bravo, Aisling Franciosi and Almudena Amor, was announced. Shooting for the project began the following month in the United Kingdom.

== Release ==
By November 2025, the film had been retitled to Pose, and it premiered at the Tallinn Black Nights Film Festival on November 12, 2025. It was released in the United States on December 12, 2025.
