= The Bride (2015 Spanish film) =

- Original theatrical release poster
- Spanish: La novia
- Directed by: Paula Ortiz
- Written by: Paula Ortiz; Javier García Arredondo
- Based on: Blood Wedding by Federico García Lorca
- Starring: Inma Cuesta; Álex García; Asier Etxeandia; Luisa Gavasa; Carlos Álvarez-Nóvoa; Consuelo Trujillo; Leticia Dolera; Manuela Vellés; Verónica Moral; María Alfonso Rosso
- Cinematography: Migue Amoedo
- Edited by: Javier García
- Music by: Shigeru Umebayashi
- Production companies: Get In The Picture Productions; Mantar Film; Rec Films; Cine Chromatix KG
- Release dates: 23 September 2015 (San Sebastián); 11 December 2015 (Spain)
- Running time: 93 minutes
- Countries: Spain; Turkey; Germany
- Language: Spanish
- Box office: $1.7 million

The Bride (Spanish: La novia) is a 2015 drama film directed by Paula Ortiz which stars Inma Cuesta, Álex García and Asier Etxeandia. The screenplay is based on Blood Wedding, the 1933 tragedy by Federico García Lorca. It was screened in the Zabaltegi section of the 2015 San Sebastián International Film Festival. It was also named as one of three films that could be chosen as the Spanish submission for the Best Foreign Language Film at the 89th Academy Awards, but it was not selected.

== Plot ==
Leonardo, The Groom and The Bride have been an inseparable triangle since they were children, but Leonardo and The Bride possess an invisible, ferocious, unbreakable thread. The years go by and she, in anguish, is getting prepared for her wedding with The Groom in the middle of the white desert where she lives with her father. The day before the ceremony, a beggar knocks on her door and offers her a present and a piece of advice: "Don't get married if you don't love him", while she gives her two crystal daggers. The Bride's body shudders.

== Cast ==
- Inma Cuesta as la novia ('the Bride')
- Asier Etxeandia as el novio ('the Groom')
- Álex García as Leonardo
- Luisa Gavasa as madre ('mother')
- Carlos Álvarez-Nóvoa as padre ('father')
- Ana Fernández as vecina ('neighbour')
- Consuelo Trujillo as criada ('maid')
- Leticia Dolera as mujer de Leonardo ('Leonardo's wife')
- María Alfonsa Rosso as mendiga ('beggar')
- Manuela Vellés as muchacha 1 ('young girl 1')
- Verónica Moral
- Mariana Cordero as suegra ('mother-in-law')
- Pedro Rebollo as cura
- Laura Gómez-Lacueva as chica

== Awards and nominations ==
Year	Award	Category	Nominee(s)	Result	Ref.
2016	3rd Feroz Awards	Best Drama Film		Won	
2016	3rd Feroz Awards	Best Director	Paula Ortiz	Won	
2016	3rd Feroz Awards	Best Screenplay	Paula Ortiz, Javier García Arredondo	Nominated	
2016	3rd Feroz Awards	Best Main Actress	Inma Cuesta	Won	
2016	3rd Feroz Awards	Best Supporting Actor	Carlos Álvarez-Nóvoa	Nominated	
2016	3rd Feroz Awards	Best Supporting Actress	Luisa Gavasa	Won	
2016	3rd Feroz Awards	Best Original Soundtrack	Shigeru Umebayashi	Won	
2016	3rd Feroz Awards	Best Trailer		Won	
2016	3rd Feroz Awards	Best Film Poster		Nominated	
2016	30th Goya Awards	Best Film		Nominated	
2016	30th Goya Awards	Best Director	Paula Ortiz	Nominated	
2016	30th Goya Awards	Best Adapted Screenplay	Paula Ortiz, Javier García Arredondo	Nominated	
2016	30th Goya Awards	Best Actor	Asier Etxeandia	Nominated	
2016	30th Goya Awards	Best Actress	Inma Cuesta	Nominated	
2016	30th Goya Awards	Best Supporting Actress	Luisa Gavasa	Won	
2016	30th Goya Awards	Best New Actor	Álex García	Nominated	
2016	30th Goya Awards	Best Cinematography	Miguel Ángel Amoedo	Won	
2016	30th Goya Awards	Best Art Direction	Jesús Bosqued Maté and Pilar Quintana	Nominated	
2016	30th Goya Awards	Best Sound	Clemens Grulich, César Molina and Ignacio Arenas	Nominated	
2016	30th Goya Awards	Best Makeup and Hairstyles	Esther Guillem and Pilar Guillem	Nominated	
2016	30th Goya Awards	Best Original Score	Shigeru Umebayashi	Nominated	
2016	25th Actors and Actresses Union Awards	Best Film Actress in a Leading Role	Inma Cuesta	Won	
2016	25th Actors and Actresses Union Awards	Best Film Actor in a Leading Role	Asier Etxeandia	Nominated	
2016	25th Actors and Actresses Union Awards	Best Film Actress in a Secondary Role	Luisa Gavasa	Won	
2016	25th Actors and Actresses Union Awards	Best Film Actor in a Secondary Role	Carlos Álvarez-Nóvoa	Nominated	
2016	25th Actors and Actresses Union Awards	Best Film Actress in a Minor Role	Ana Fernández	Won	
2016	25th Actors and Actresses Union Awards	Best Film Actress in a Minor Role	María Alfonsa Rosso	Nominated	

== See also ==
- List of Spanish films of 2015
