= Verónica (2017 Spanish film) =

2017 film

- Theatrical release poster
- Directed by: Paco Plaza
- Screenplay by: Paco Plaza; Fernando Navarro
- Produced by: Enrique López Lavigne
- Starring: Sandra Escacena; Claudia Placer; Bruna González; Iván Chavero; Ana Torrent
- Cinematography: Pablo Rosso
- Edited by: Martí Roca
- Music by: Chucky Namanera
- Production companies: Apache Films; El Expediente La Película AIE
- Distributed by: Sony Pictures Releasing International
- Release date: 25 August 2017
- Running time: 105 minutes
- Country: Spain
- Language: Spanish
- Box office: $6.3 million

Veronica (Spanish: Verónica) is a 2017 Spanish supernatural horror film directed by Paco Plaza which stars Sandra Escacena alongside Claudia Placer, Bruna González, Iván Chavero and Ana Torrent. It is loosely based on true events from a 1991 Vallecas case in which Estefanía Gutiérrez Lázaro died mysteriously after a séance using a ouija board.

== Plot ==
The film opens in medias res, with emergency services responding to a call from a young girl made on June 15, 1991. She sounds panicked and screams about something coming to get her brother before the call cuts off. The film goes back in time three days.

Fifteen-year-old Verónica lives with her family in the working-class district of Vallecas, Madrid. After her father's death, her mother works long hours to support the family, leaving Verónica in charge of her younger siblings: twins Lucia and Irene, and Antoñito.

On the day of the 1991 solar eclipse, her teacher explains how some ancient cultures used eclipses to stage human sacrifices and summon dark spirits. Later, in the school basement, Verónica and her friends Rosa and Diana conduct a séance with a Ouija board. Verónica wants to reach out to her late father, and Diana her late boyfriend who died in a motorcycle accident. The glass cup suddenly becomes too hot, prompting Rosa and Diana to pull their hands back. The moment the eclipse occurs, the cup shatters, cutting Verónica's finger and her blood drips onto the board. Verónica becomes unresponsive, whispering something repeatedly, then lets out a demonic scream. She wakes in the school nurse's office, who tells her she probably passed out from iron deficiency.

Verónica begins experiencing paranormal occurrences and her friends avoid her. She goes back to the school basement and finds the school's elderly blind nun nicknamed Hermana Muerte ('Sister Death') by the students. The nun explains that the séance attached a dark spirit to her. She unsuccessfully compels the spirit to leave. She instructed Verónica to protect her sibling from the entity.

Verónica draws protective Viking symbols for the kids, only for the demon to destroy them. She intervenes when the spirit chokes Lucia, only to learn that she herself was choking Lucia. Verónica wakes up to find that she's on her first period. As she scrubs her mattress, she finds burn marks on the underside. She also finds on each of the kids' mattresses a large burn mark in the shape of a human body. Sister Death tells Verónica that she used to see dark spirits when she was younger, and intentionally blinded herself in an unsuccessful attempt to stop the visions. Verónica reads in an occult magazine that she can force the spirits to leave by doing right what she did wrong as it is important to say goodbye to the spirit at the end of a séance. Verónica asks Rosa and Diana to hold another séance, but they refuse. Rosa reveals that at the séance, Verónica whispered that she herself would die in three days.

Desperate, Verónica decides to hold the séance with her siblings. She has Antoñito draw the protective symbols on the walls, but he incorrectly copies the symbols of invocation. During the séance, they have to repeatedly sing a melody and decide on the advertising jingle for "Centella," the only song they all know. When Verónica tells the spirit to say goodbye, it refuses. She calls the police and escapes with her siblings. However, she sees that she is not actually holding Antoñito but had imagined it. Her brother is actually hiding in a closet. She finds Antoñito but he refuse go with her. Verónica looks at herself in the mirror and sees the demon, realizing she has been possessed by the demon the entire time, and had been harming her siblings under its control. She attempts to end the possession by slitting her own throat but is prevented by the demon. The police enter to find her being attacked by an invisible force, partially levitating and passing out. The medics carry her and Antoñito out while a shaken detective observes the scene. As the detective watches a photograph of Verónica suddenly catch fire, he is informed that she has died.

In his official report, he mentions unexplained paranormal activity having occurred in the house. It is explained that the movie is based on the true events of the first police report in Spain where a police officer certifies having witnessed paranormal activity.

== Cast ==
- Sandra Escacena as Verónica
- Bruna González as Lucía
- Claudia Placer as Irene
- Iván Chavero as Antoñito
- Ana Torrent as Ana
- Consuelo Trujillo as Sister Death
- Sonia Almarcha as Doctor
- Maru Valdivielso as Josefa
- Leticia Dolera as History Teacher
- Ángela Fabián as Rosa
- Samuel Romero
- Carla Campra as Diana

== Inspiration ==
The film was inspired when Estefanía Gutiérrez Lázaro (1973–1991) reportedly suffered hallucinations and seizures after performing a séance at a school in Madrid to try to contact her friend's deceased boyfriend who had died six months earlier. Her exact cause of death is a mystery. Her house allegedly became haunted after her death according to the British magazine NME. The American magazine Newsweek, referenced by NME, is more cautious and while acknowledging that the case is real, likens the event to the similar pop-culture phenomenon and urban legend The Amityville Horror. In the same magazine, director Paco Plaza says that he didn't feel bound to portray the real events, clarifying "...the whole story of Veronica and the sisters and Antoñito, this little Marlon Brando with glasses, it’s all a vision."

== Production ==
The screenplay was penned by Paco Plaza alongside Fernando Navarro. The film was produced by Apache Films alongside El Expediente La Película AIE, with the participation of RTVE and support from ICAA. The score was composed by Eugenio Mira, credited under the pseudonym Chucky Namanera. The film's soundtrack also features the songs "Maldito duende", "Entre dos tierras" and "Hechizo" by Héroes Del Silencio (all from their album Senderos de traición (1990)) and an advertising jingle for a brand called "Centella".

== Release ==
Verónica originally released on 25 August 2017 in Spain and was selected for the lineup of the 2017 Toronto International Film Festival's Contemporary World Cinema section. In addition, the film was released in eight other countries between December 2017 and February 2018.

The rights for the film were later bought by streaming platform Netflix where it was released in early March 2018 and became a small hit.

== Prequel ==
A prequel film titled Sister Death (Hermana Muerte), directed by Paco Plaza and starring Aria Bedmar, was released on Netflix in October 2023.

== Reception ==
=== Box office ===
In Spain the film grossed $4,212,203, and $1,910,886 in other territories, for a worldwide total of $6,123,089.

=== Critical response ===
The review aggregator Rotten Tomatoes reports an 86% approval rating from 35 critic reviews. The website's critical consensus reads, "A scarily effective horror outing, Veronica proves it doesn't take fancy or exotic ingredients to craft skin-crawling genre thrills."

Jonathan Holland from The Hollywood Reporter gave a negative review of the film and wrote, "The real horror in Veronica is not in the CGI visuals, or in Pablo Rosso's frantic cinematography, or in the aural bombardment of sound effects and music; it’s in the relationship between the children". Overall, he sums up his film review with the bottom line "Thick on chills, thin on psychology."

Shortly after the release of Verónica on Netflix, Jordan Crucchoila of Vulture countered other reviewers who believed that Verónica was the scariest movie on the streaming service: "In our estimation, Veronica is not that scary. It’s a worthy effort, but as far as witch-board movies go, you’ll get more out of Ouija 2: Origin of Evil." She added that the film had "some great set-piece scares, and the movie’s most disturbing moment is pretty damn good." Ed Potton of The Times gave the film a 2 out of 5, and wrote "A considerable buzz online suggested that this Spanish horror might arrest the recent run of iffy Netflix movies. Sadly, it doesn't." Dennis Harvey of Variety wrote that the film's ideas "aren’t ultimately original enough or its scares potent enough to suggest Plaza wouldn’t benefit from trying his directorial hand at someone else’s screenplay." Referring to the Rotten Tomatoes score, Paul Tassi from Forbes magazine wrote, "If I was scoring the movie myself I’d probably give it a 6 out of 10, “fresh,” but not exactly stunning."

=== Accolades ===
| Year | Award | Category | Nominee(s) | Result | Ref. |
|---|---|---|---|---|---|
| 2018 | 73rd CEC Medals | Best Editing | Martí Roca | Won | |
| 2018 | 73rd CEC Medals | Best New Actress | Sandra Escacena | Won | |
| 2018 | 73rd CEC Medals | Best Original Screenplay | Paco Plaza, Fernando Navarro | Nominated | |
| 2018 | 73rd CEC Medals | Best Score | Eugenio Mira | Nominated | |
| 2018 | 5th Feroz Awards | Best Director | Paco Plaza | Nominated | |
| 2018 | 5th Feroz Awards | Best Drama Film | | Nominated | |
| 2018 | 5th Feroz Awards | Best Original Score | Eugenio Mira | Nominated | |
| 2018 | 5th Feroz Awards | Best Trailer | Rafa Martínez | Nominated | |
| 2018 | 5th Feroz Awards | Best Actress in a Leading Role | Sandra Escacena | Nominated | |
| 2018 | 5th Feroz Awards | Best Screenplay | Paco Plaza, Fernando Navarro | Nominated | |
| 2018 | 32nd Goya Awards | Best Film | Expediente La Película A.I.E., Apaches Entertainment | Nominated | |
| 2018 | 32nd Goya Awards | Best Director | Paco Plaza | Nominated | |
| 2018 | 32nd Goya Awards | Best Original Screenplay | Paco Plaza, Fernando Navarro | Nominated | |
| 2018 | 32nd Goya Awards | Best Original Score | Eugenio Mira | Nominated | |
| 2018 | 32nd Goya Awards | Best New Actress | Sandra Escacena | Nominated | |
| 2018 | 32nd Goya Awards | Best Sound | Aitor Berenguer, Gabriel Gutiérrez, Nicolas de Poulpiquet | Won | |
| 2018 | 32nd Goya Awards | Best Special Effects | Raúl Romanillos, David Heras | Nominated | |
| 2018 | 27th Actors and Actresses Union Awards | Best New Actress | Sandra Escacena | Nominated | |
| 2018 | 5th Platino Awards | Best Sound | Aitor Berenguer, Gabriel Gutiérrez, Nicolas de Poulpiquet | Nominated | |
| 2019 | Fangoria Chainsaw Awards | Best Streaming Premiere Film | Paco Plaza | Nominated | |

== See also ==
- List of Spanish films of 2017
- List of films featuring eclipses
