= Chrysalis (2011 film) =

- Film poster
- Spanish: De tu ventana a la mía
- Directed by: Paula Ortiz
- Written by: Paula Ortiz
- Produced by: Kike Mora
- Starring: Maribel Verdú; Leticia Dolera
- Cinematography: Migue Amoedo
- Music by: Avshalom Caspi
- Distributed by: Alta Films
- Release dates: 28 October 2011 (VIFF); 9 March 2012 (Spain)
- Running time: 98 minutes
- Country: Spain
- Language: Spanish

Chrysalis (Spanish: De tu ventana a la mía; lit. 'From your window to mine') is a 2011 Spanish drama film written and directed by Paula Ortiz.

== Cast ==
- Maribel Verdú as Inés
- Leticia Dolera as Violeta
- Luisa Gavasa as Luisa
- Roberto Álamo as Paco
- Fran Perea as Pedro
- Miguel Alcíbar as Guardián
- Carlos Álvarez-Nóvoa as Tío Fernando
- Álex Angulo as Médico
- Ramón Barea as Marín
- Luis Bermejo as Valentín
