= Muse (2017 film) =

- Theatrical release poster
- Directed by: Jaume Balagueró
- Screenplay by: Jaume Balagueró; Fernando Navarro
- Based on: The Lady Number Thirteen by José Carlos Somoza
- Produced by: Julio Fernández; Carlos Fernández; Laura Fernández; Brendan McCarthy; Jean-Yves Roubin; Manuel Chiche
- Starring: Elliot Cowan; Franka Potente; Ana Ularu; Joanne Whalley; Christopher Lloyd; Leonor Watling
- Cinematography: Pablo Rosso
- Edited by: Guillermo de la Cal
- Music by: Stephen Rennicks
- Production companies: Castelao Producciones; Amber Entertainment
- Distributed by: Filmax
- Release dates: 7 October 2017 (Sitges Film Festival); 1 December 2017 (Spain)
- Country: Spain
- Language: English

Muse (Spanish: Musa) is a 2017 English-language Spanish supernatural thriller film directed by Jaume Balagueró. The screenplay, written by Balagueró and Fernando Navarro, is based on José Carlos Somoza's 2003 Spanish novel The Lady Number Thirteen. The film stars Elliot Cowan, Franka Potente, Ana Ularu, Joanne Whalley, Christopher Lloyd and Leonor Watling. It was released in Spain on 1 December 2017.

== Synopsis ==
Samuel Solomon, a literature professor, experiences a recurring nightmare ever since the death of his girlfriend, in which a woman is brutally murdered. When the same woman in his dreams is found dead in reality, Solomon seeks an explanation. Rachel, a woman who claims to have also dreamed of the murder, helps Solomon in discovering the identity of the mysterious woman.

== Cast ==
- Elliot Cowan as Samuel Solomon
- Franka Potente as Susan
- Ana Ularu as Rachel
- Joanne Whalley as Jacqueline
- Christopher Lloyd as Rauschen
- Leonor Watling as Lidia
- Manuela Vellés as Beatriz

== Production ==
In late October 2014, it was announced that Balagueró came on board to direct the film. An adaptation of José Carlos Somoza's novel The Lady Number Thirteen, Muse is the third English-language film he directed following the 2002 film Darkness and the 2005 film Fragile. Of the project, Balagueró said:

This is just the kind of story that has always fascinated me, as a movie-goer and as a director. The combination of the supernatural, seduction, macabre rituals and love is an explosive one and has all the elements required to make a truly terrifying movie.

Principal photography began in December 2016, shot on location in Belgium, the Republic of Ireland and Spain.
