= Carmen Juares =

Spanish-Honduran activist and social educator

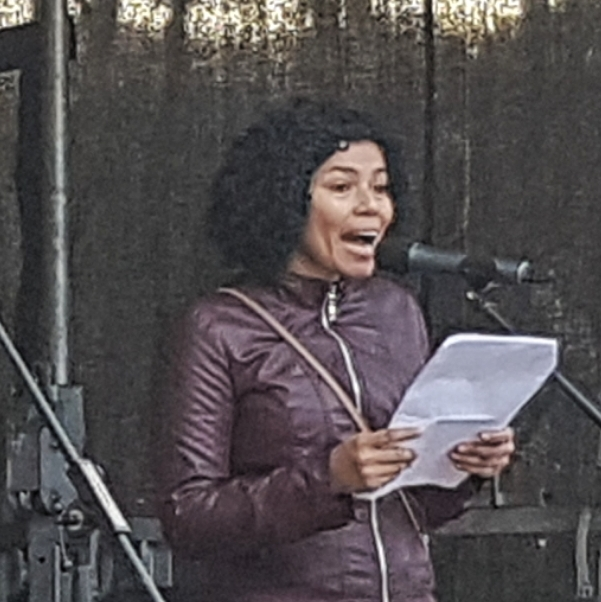
- Reading the manifesto in November 2018
- Born: 1986; Alianza, Honduras
- Education: University of Barcelona
- Occupation: activist for exploited migrant caregivers
- Employer: Dones Migrant Diverses

Carmen Juares Palma (born 1986) is a Spanish-Honduran activist and social educator. She was a founder and the co-ordinator of Dones Migrant Diverses that looks after migrant caregivers. There are estimated to be 34,000 of these exploited caregivers in Barcelona who live outside the conditions given to workers who are legally employed. Juares was a caregiver for six years on duty for the whole week except for twelve or less hours of free time.

== Life ==
Juares was born in Alianza in Honduras in 1986. She lived near Tegucigalpa and it was a violent country. It was not safe to sit in a public place. Her father was killed and she arrived in Spain when she was nineteen.

She lives in Catalonia and speaks Catalan. She says that she has more freedom to go out than she did in Honduras but people make assumptions about her. They assume she cannot speak Catalan and men assume that she may be easily persuaded, by money, to have sex. She does value her increased freedom and is happy to see men kissing each other in public without fear, but she wants to see equality for migrants.

She co-founded the organisation Dones Migrant Diverses that campaigns for rights of migrant caregivers. She became the organisation's coordinator.

In 2018, the Spanish actress Leticia Dolera was asked to open the La Mercè festival in September in Barcelona. Dolera had just published her book about feminism Morder la manzana. La revolución será feminista o no será. Dolera shared her time at the opening with Juares. Juares thanked Dolera for allowing her to reveal the "invisible". Juares told the crowd about her life as a migrant from Honduras, who had spent six years in Barcelona as a caregiver. Juares had cared for a woman with dementia in conditions that many would regard as slavery. Each week she had twelve or less hours when she wasn't working.

Barcelona council have estimated that there are 34,000 migrants in a similar situation working as live-in carers. Juares was paid 800 euros a month and others report similar figures. This would not be allowed if they were legal workers but their employers do not give them a contract. The carers cannot insist, because they are worried at losing their source of income. Because of their long hours, the workers who are members of Dones Migrant Diverses, communicate primarily via a WhatsApp group.

On the International Day for the Elimination of Violence against Women in November 2018 she, journalist Júlia Bertran i Lafuente and Sofía Bengoetxea read the manifesto on the day in Barcelona.

In 2021, she completed a degree in Social Education at the University of Barcelona and she also led a strike of over 300 dark-supermarket riders. She challenged the established unions to get to grips with the exploitation in the gig-economy. She was employed by one of the two big unions in Catalonia.
