= The Grandmother (2021 film) =

2021 horror film

- Theatrical release poster
- Spanish: La abuela
- Directed by: Paco Plaza
- Written by: Carlos Vermut
- Produced by: Enrique López Lavigne
- Starring: Almudena Amor; Vera Valdez
- Cinematography: Daniel Fernández Abelló
- Edited by: David Gallart
- Music by: Fatima Al Qadiri
- Production companies: Apache Films; Atresmedia Cine; Sony Pictures International Productions; Les Films du Worso
- Distributed by: Sony Pictures Releasing International (es); Wild Bunch (fr)
- Release dates: 22 September 2021 (Zinemaldia); 28 January 2022 (Spain); 6 April 2022 (France)
- Running time: 100 minutes
- Countries: Spain; France
- Languages: Spanish; French
- Box office: $3 million

The Grandmother (Spanish: La abuela) is a 2021 horror film directed by Paco Plaza from a screenplay by Carlos Vermut which stars Almudena Amor and Vera Valdez. It is a Spanish-French co-production. Tracking a fashion model (Amor) returning home to look after her ailing grandmother (Valdez), the plot tackles the horror of ageing and the need for elderly care, with a supernatural side taking over progressively.

The film had its world premiere at the 69th San Sebastián International Film Festival on 22 September 2021, and was released in Spain and France, respectively on 28 January and 6 April 2022.

== Plot ==
The movie opens with an elderly woman entering an apartment, where she finds another older woman lying dead on the floor, and a half-eaten birthday cake on a table. She is then greeted by a young, blond naked woman. The old woman seems happy to see her and kneels down on the floor and kisses her. The film then focuses on Susana, a fashion model working in Paris; she calls her grandmother Pilar and tells her she will not be in Madrid for her birthday. A short time later, while snorting a stripe on her cellphone, Susana receives a call from a hospital in Madrid, telling her her grandmother had a brain hemorrhage. Being Pilar's only remaining living relative, Susana travels to Madrid; it is then revealed that Pilar is the same elderly woman from the opening sequence.

Back in Madrid, Susana takes the seemingly brain-damaged Pilar back to her apartment in Calle de Alfonso XII (next to El Retiro) and moves in to take care of her. As the days go by, Susana begins having several disturbing nightmares, making her uneasy. One day, Susana finds a young woman named Eva visiting Pilar. Eva tells her she is the niece of Pilar's best friend Julita, and that she and Susana have met before, but Susana does not remember her nor Julita. One night, Susana comes across her childhood diary; after reading it, she recalls a birthday party where she met both Eva and Julita. On that party, the two girls underwent some sort of strange ritual and both got locks of their hair cut; Susana also remembers that, from that day on, she began having nightmares related to her grandmother. She also begins to suspect that Pilar is moving through the apartment at night.

Growing increasingly disturbed, Susana tries to leave and find accommodation for her grandmother, and in doing so, realizes that Pilar is a witch with supernatural powers. She causes the death of Adela, a domestic worker Susana had hired to take care of her. Then, the same day Susana takes her to a nursing home a fire breaks out and kills all the guests in the house, whilst Pilar is seen back at her apartment without further explanation. Determined to go back to Paris, Susana kills Pilar by poisoning her soup. Minutes after her grandmother's death, the phone rings: it is Eva, who hears Susana's youthful voice and calls her Pilar. Susana responds by saying that she is not Pilar, to which Eva replies: "Are you sure?".

Shortly after, Pilar uses her powers to move things around the house and keep Susana from leaving. Susana locks herself in the bathroom where she finds a painting of Pilar in her youth; she is then attacked by Pilar, who uses her powers to immobilize her to the floor. Pilar opens her mouth and transfers her soul to Susana's body. Susana, now possessed by Pilar, goes to look at the painting, which now shows Susana. Shortly after, Eva –revealed to be the young woman from the beginning– appears. The two women caress each other intimately and the film ends.

== Cast ==
- Almudena Amor as Susana
- Vera Valdez as Pilar
- Karina Kolokolchykova as Eva
- Chacha Huang
- Michael Collis

== Production ==
The film was produced by Apache Films in association with Atresmedia Cine and Sony Pictures International Productions and in co-production with Les Films du Worso, with participation from Atresmedia and Amazon Prime Video and funding from Eurimages and ICAA. Enrique López Lavigne is credited as producer. Paco Plaza directed the film whereas Carlos Vermut took over writing duties. Daniel Fernández Abelló was responsible for the cinematography whereas Fatima Al Qadiri composed the score.

Shooting lasted for seven weeks and wrapped by August 2020. It took place in between Paris and Madrid.

== Release ==
The film participated in the official selection of the 69th San Sebastián International Film Festival (SSIFF). It premiered on 22 September 2021 (6th day). It also screened at the 54th Sitges Film Festival. Its theatrical release in Spain was tentatively slated for 22 October 2021, but it was delayed to 5 January 2022, and then postponed again due to the COVID-19 pandemic. It eventually opened in theatres on 28 January 2022, grossing half a million € in its opening weekend (the best box office debut in the aforementioned week), becoming the highest-grossing Spanish film of 2022 in the domestic market over the course of its initial 8-week run with 1.8 million €. It became available on Amazon Prime Video on 25 March 2022. Distributed by Wild Bunch, the film opened in French theatres on 6 April 2022.

== Reception ==
Andrea G. Bermejo of Cinemanía rated the film with 4 out of 5 stars, assessing that it brings together the best distinctive elements from Plaza and Vermut.

Raquel Hernández Luján of HobbyConsolas scored the film with 67 out of 100 points ("acceptable"), deeming it to be, flaws notwithstanding, a film worthy of your time, praising the setting, the performances, the score and the production design, while negatively assessing that the film sabotages itself by providing too much information at the beginning.

Jordi Batlle Caminal of Fotogramas gave it 4 out of 5 stars, extolling the mise-en-scène and the exemplary handling of space while negatively assessing the disputable and unnecessarily gimmicky conclusion.

== Accolades ==
| Year | Award | Category | Nominee(s) | Result | Ref. |
|---|---|---|---|---|---|
| 2022 | 9th Feroz Awards | Best Trailer | Miguel Ángel Trudu | Won | |
| 2022 | 9th Feroz Awards | Best Poster | Octavio Terol, Jorge Alvariño | Nominated | |
| 2022 | 29th Gérardmer International Fantasy Film Festival | Jury Prize | | Won | |
| 2022 | 36th Goya Awards | Best Original Score | Fatima Al Qadiri | Nominated | |
| 2022 | 36th Goya Awards | Best Special Effects | Raúl Romanillos, Ferran Piquer | Nominated | |

== See also ==
- List of Spanish films of 2022
