= The Eclipse, or the Courtship of the Sun and Moon =

The Eclipse: Courtship of the Sun and Moon
- Directed by: Georges Méliès
- Produced by: Georges Méliès
- Starring: Georges Méliès
- Release date: 1907
- Running time: 9 min.
- Country: France
- Language: silent film

The Eclipse: Courtship of the Sun and Moon (originally L'éclipse du soleil en pleine lune) is a French silent trick film made in 1907 by director Georges Méliès.

== Plot ==
A professor of astronomy gives a lecture instructing on an impending solar eclipse. The class rushes to an observation tower to witness the event, which features an anthropomorphic Sun and Moon coming together. The Moon and the Sun lick their lips in anticipation as the eclipse arrives, culminating in a romantic encounter between the two celestial bodies. Various heavenly bodies, including planets and moons, hang in the night sky; a meteor shower is depicted using the ghostly figures of girls. The professor of astronomy, shocked by all he has witnessed, topples from the observation tower. Fortunately, he lands in a rain barrel, and is revived by his students.

== Cast ==
- Mlle. Bodson as Comet
- Manuel as The Class Supervisor
- Georges Méliès as Professor of Astronomy

== Production ==
Méliès appears in the film as the professor, with the actor Manuel as the class supervisor and Mademoiselle Bodson as a comet. Some scenes in The Eclipse were originally made by Méliès for a film commissioned for a revue at a Paris music hall, La Cigale. Special effects in The Eclipse were created with stage machinery, pyrotechnics, substitution splices, superimpositions, dissolves, rolling scenery, and a mannequin for the professor's fall.

== Themes ==
The Eclipse has been remarked upon for its overt sexual symbolism. Christine Cornea posits that the film's primary theme, the clash of scientific logic with sexual desire, was also evident in Méliès' earlier films A Trip to the Moon and The Impossible Voyage, and would become a prominent in many subsequent science-fiction films.

Some scholars, interpreting the Sun and the Moon to be both male, have described the erotic "eclipse" as an early depiction of homosexuality in cinema, with an "effeminate" Moon being seduced by a "devilishly masculine" Sun. By contrast, Méliès's film catalogue describes the liaison in heterosexual terms, referring to the participants as "the man in the sun" and "dainty Diana" and using pronouns to match. Film critic William B. Parrill calls this courtship scene "a comic passage worthy of Ernst Lubitsch at his best … one of the great moments of silent comedy."

== See also ==
- List of films featuring eclipses
