= The Influence (2019 film) =

2019 Spanish horror film by Denis Rovira

- Film poster
- Spanish: La influencia
- Directed by: Denis Rovira van Boekholt
- Written by: Ramsey Campbell; Denis Rovira van Boekholt; Michel Gaztambide; Daniel Rissech
- Based on: The Influence by Ramsey Campbell
- Starring: Manuela Vellés; Alain Hernández; Maggie Civantos; Claudia Placer
- Distributed by: Netflix
- Release date: 11 October 2019
- Running time: 99 minutes
- Country: Spain
- Language: Spanish

The Influence (Spanish: La influencia) is a 2019 Spanish horror film directed by Denis Rovira van Boekholt in his feature directorial debut. The film stars Manuela Vellés, Alain Hernández, Maggie Civantos and Claudia Placer. The film is based on the adaptation from a novel with the same title The Influence, written by popular English novelist Ramsey Campbell in 1988. The film was streamed via Netflix on 11 October 2019 and opened to mixed reviews from critics.

== Synopsis ==
Alicia (Manuela Vellés) has returned to the family home which she fled as a child. Along with her husband, Mikel (Alain Hernández) and her nine-year-old daughter, Nora (Claudia Placer), Alicia seeks to rebuild her life while being forced to confront a past she believed forgotten and a body that refuses to die: that of Victoria (Emma Suárez), the possessive family matriarch who has fallen into a deep coma and barely survives on life support.

== Cast ==
- Manuela Vellés as Alicia
- Alain Hernández as Mikel
- Maggie Civantos as Sara
- Claudia Placer as Nora
- Emma Suárez as Victoria
- Daniela Rubin as Luna
- Mariana Cordero as Mejido
- Carlos Cuevas as Fran
- Felipe García Vélez as Tio Pedro
- Marta Castellote as Ana
- Ramón Esquinas as Abuelo
- David Luque as Notario
