= Home (2020 film) =

- Directed by: Franka Potente
- Written by: Franka Potente
- Produced by: Jonas Katzenstein; Maximillian Leo
- Starring: Jake McLaughlin; Kathy Bates; Aisling Franciosi; Derek Richardson; James Jordan; Lil Rel Howery; Stephen Root
- Cinematography: Frank Griebe
- Edited by: Antje Zynga
- Music by: Volker Bertelmann
- Production companies: Augenschein FilmProduktion; BAC Films; Lemming Film; Fireglory Pictures; SR; Arte; Eurimages; Creative Europe; Film-und Medien Stiftung NRW; Netherlands Film Fund
- Distributed by: BAC Films (France); Weltkino (Germany)
- Release date: 20 October 2020 (Rome)
- Running time: 100 minutes
- Countries: Germany; France; Netherlands
- Language: English

Home is a 2020 internationally co-produced drama film written and directed by Franka Potente, in her directorial debut. It stars Jake McLaughlin, Kathy Bates, Aisling Franciosi, Derek Richardson, James Jordan, Lil Rel Howery and Stephen Root.

It had its world premiere at the Rome Film Festival on 20 October 2020.

== Plot ==
An ex-felon returns home from prison and confronts the demons from his past.

== Cast ==
- Jake McLaughlin as Marvin
- Kathy Bates as Bernadette
- Aisling Franciosi as Delta
- Derek Richardson as Wade
- James Jordan as Russell
- Lil Rel Howery as Jayden
- Stephen Root as Father Browning
- Bryn Vale as Katie

== Production ==
In May 2019, it was announced Jake McLaughlin, Kathy Bates, and Lil Rel Howery had joined the cast of the film, with Franka Potente directing from a screenplay she wrote, with BAC Films set to produce and distribute the film in France.

== Release ==
It had its world premiere at the Rome Film Festival on 20 October 2020. It also screened at the San Francisco International Film Festival on 9 April 2021.

== Reception ==
On the review aggregator website Rotten Tomatoes, 71% of 7 critics' reviews are positive.

On The Guardian, Leslie Felperin rated it 3 out of 5 stars writing that "the set-up teeters on the edge of cliche, but Potente and the fine cast keep it from toppling over by restraining the emotional torque of the material." On Screen International, Wendy Ide wrote that "the lack of soapy histrionics serves the film well - this is a story told quietly, calmly and with dignity."

Writing in The Wrap, Carlos Aguilar highlighted in his review that "engaging performances by Jake McLaughlin and Kathy Bates make up for some script shortcomings." For Film Threat, Allan Ng scored the film an 8 out of 10 writing in his review consensus section: "the plot works beautifully, and McLaughlin shines."

== See also ==
- List of drama films of the 2020s
