= Chaotic Ana =

- Spanish: Caótica Ana
- Directed by: Julio Medem
- Written by: Julio Medem
- Produced by: Julio Médem
- Starring: Manuela Vellés; Charlotte Rampling; Bebe; Asier Newman; Nicolas Cazalé; Raúl Peña; Gerrit Graham; Matthias Habich; Lluís Homar
- Cinematography: Mario Montero
- Edited by: Julio Medem
- Music by: Jocelyn Pook
- Production companies: Sogecine; Alicia Produce; Volcano Films
- Distributed by: Sogepaq
- Release date: 24 August 2007
- Running time: 115 minutes
- Country: Spain
- Languages: Spanish; English; French; Berber; Arabic

Chaotic Ana (Spanish: Caótica Ana) is a 2007 Spanish drama film written, directed, and edited by Julio Medem which stars Manuela Vellés as the title character.

== Plot ==
A synopsis prior to the release of the film stated:

"Caotica Ana is the story-journey of Ana during four years of her life, from 18 to 22. A countdown, 10, 9, 8, 7... until 0, like in hypnosis, through which Ana proves that she does not live alone, that her existence seems like a continuation of other lives of young women who died in a tragic way, all at the age of 22, and who live in the abyss of her unconscious memory. This is her chaos. Ana is the princess and the monster of this feminist fable against the tyranny of man."

== Cast ==
- Manuela Vellés as Ana
- Bebe Rebolledo as Linda
- Matthias Habich as Klaus
- Charlotte Rampling as Justine
- Nicolas Cazalé as Said
- Asier Newman as Anglo
- Lluís Homar as Ismael
- Gerrit Graham as Mr. H
- Raúl Peña as Lucas
- Leslie Charles as Jovoskaya

== Production and filming ==
Chaotic Ana is Medem's first new narrative film since his 2001 film Sex and Lucia, and his follow-up to the controversial documentary La pelota vasca. As with the former, this film has been shot in HD, using the Sony HDC-950. The film is a co-production of Medem's own production company Alicia Produce alongside Sogecine and Volcano Films, and it had the participation of TVE, Canal+, and ETB.

Medem's regular composer Alberto Iglesias could not score the film.

Shooting locations included Arizona, New York, Madrid, and Fuerteventura.

This film, and story, was an attempt by director Medem to cope with the deep depression that he was suffering after the tragic accident of his younger sister, Ana, who was killed in a car accident on 28 April 2001 when it was heading towards the wine town of Cariñena, Zaragoza, where an expo of her wax paintings was going to take place. Her other brother, Alvaro, was driving the car. In her memory, Julio has a daughter named after her. As he said: "It is an attempt to escape from my own memories without achieving it as she did".

== Release ==
Distributed by Sogepaq, the film premiered in Spain in August 2007.

== See also ==
- List of Spanish films of 2007

== Bibliography ==
- Stone, Rob (2007). Julio Medem. Spanish and Latin American Filmmakers. Manchester: Manchester University Press. ISBN 978-0-7190-7200-0.
