= Paula Ortiz =

Spanish director, producer and screenwriter

Paula Ortiz Álvarez
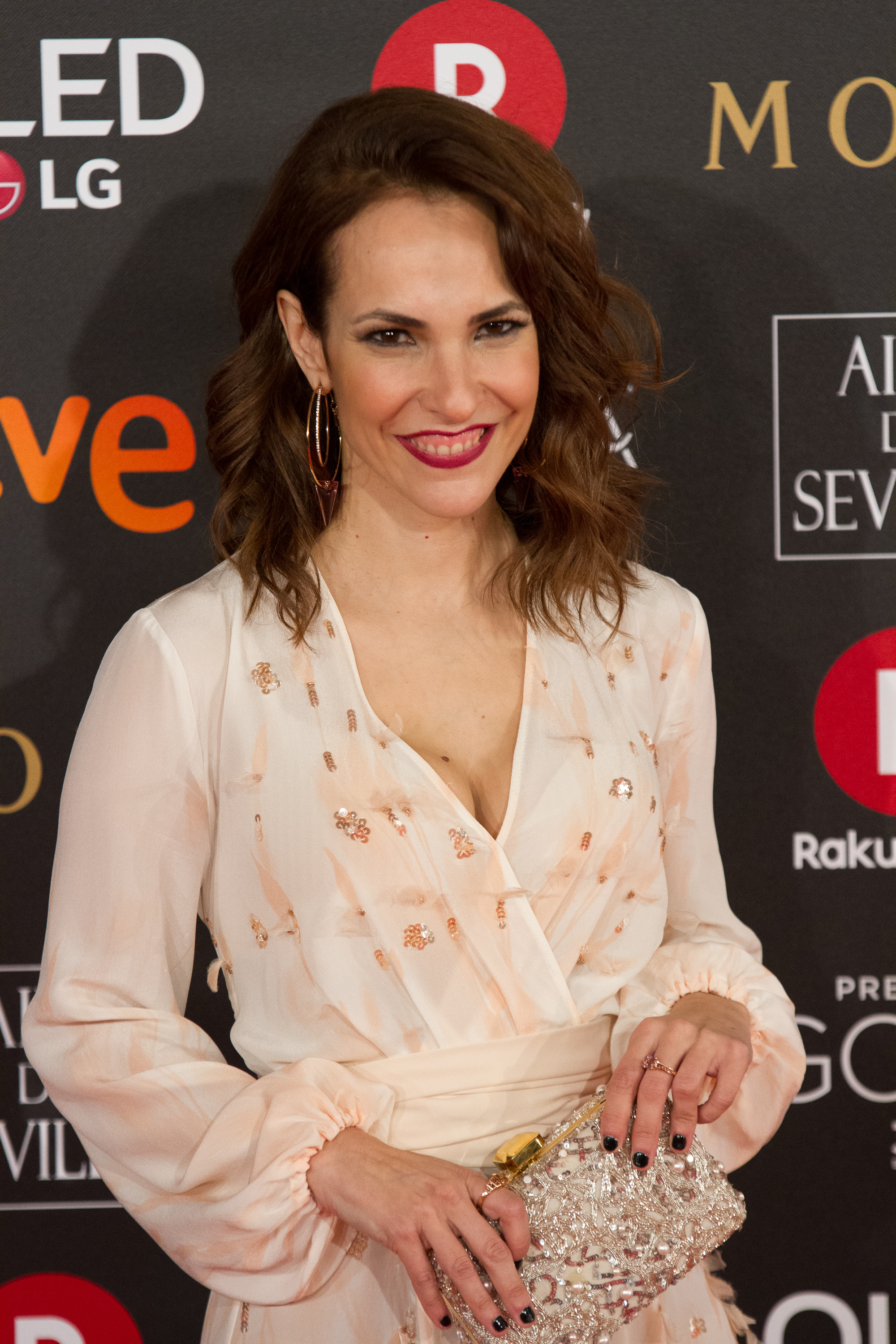
- Ortiz at the 32nd Goya Awards in 2018
- Born: January 8, 1979 (age 46); Zaragoza, Spain
- Occupation(s): Director, screenwriter and producer

Paula Ortiz Álvarez (born 8 January 1979) is a Spanish director, screenwriter and producer who works for Get in the Pictures Productions and Amapola Films, teaches Audiovisual Communication at the University of Barcelona, and collaborates with the University of San Jorge in Zaragoza.

In 2011, Ortiz was nominated for a Goya Award in the Best New Director category for her film Chrysalis, and later that year won the Pilar Miró Prize for Best New Director at the Valladolid International Film Festival.

== Early life and education ==
Paula Ortiz was born in Zaragoza in 1979. She graduated from the University of Zaragoza in 2002 with a bachelor's degree in Hispanic Philology and earned a master's degree in Writing for Cinema and TV from the Autonomous University of Barcelona in 2003. Between 2004 and 2008, Ortiz worked at the University of Zaragoza's Department of History of Art as a researcher and professor of Film and Audiovisual Media Studies. During this time, she wrote her doctoral thesis, "The Cinematographic Script: An Update of its Theoretical and Practical Bases", under the tutelage of Agustín Sánchez Vidal. Ortiz defended the thesis on 31 January 2011 at the University of Zaragoza.

She studied cinema directing in the Graduate Department of Film and Television of the Tisch School of the Arts at University of New York (NYU) and completed her screenwriting studies at the University of California, Los Angeles She was member of the Bigas Luna Workshop for narrators, and has participated in the Screenwriters Expo of Los Angeles and other screenwriting forums in Spain and the United States.

== Career ==
Ortiz has so far written and directed two feature films, Chrysalis (2011) and The Bride (2015); a documentary, Tale of Hope (2006); and several short films, History Explained in Five Minutes (2001), If I Could, I'd Go out for a Stroll Every Night (2002), The Face of Ido (2003), Family Photos (2004) and The Gap of Tristán Boj (2008).

In summer 2010 she finished shooting her first feature film, Chrysalis, produced by Amapola Films, Oria Films and Zentropa Spain and starring Maribel Verdú, Leticia Dolera, Álex Angulo and Roberto Poplar, among others. It won numerous national and international prizes and achieved commercial success. The film won Ortiz the "Pilar Miró International Prize for Best New Director" 56th Edition of the Seminci of Valladolid. It was also nominated in three categories at 2012 Goya Prizes: "Best New Director", "Best Supporting Actress" and "Best Original Song". In its world première at the prestigious Shanghai International Film Festival, Chrysalis was given a Special Recommendation by the Jury and won the Jin Jué Prize for Best Soundtrack.

At the International Festival of Mons (Brussels), Ortiz won the FEADORA International Prize for Women's Criticism. The film, distributed by High Films in Spain, and Vertex Go in the international market, was released in cinemas in March 2012 to critical and popular acclaim.

In September 2014, Ortiz finished her second film, The Bride, a loose adaptation of Blood Wedding by Federico García Lorca. Shot in Spain and Turkey, the film was a joint Spanish-Turkish-German production, and starred Inma Cuesta, Álex García, Asier Etxeandia, Luisa Gavasa and Leticia Dolera. It premièred in December 2015.

== Academia and other interests ==
Ortiz is an associate professor of the History of Cinema at the University of Barcelona and also teaches Screenwriting and Film Analysis at San Jorge University in Zaragoza.

She contributed to the production of the Hoobs Children's Encyclopaedia for Mízar Multimedia. She has directed advertising campaigns for the Government of Aragon and many businesses, such as Women Secret, Pikolin and Ebrosa.

Ortiz also works occasionally with other educational institutions like the ECAM (Madrid Film School), ESCAC (Catalonia Film School), San Pablo University CEU, the Autonomous University of Madrid, the University of Navarra, the University of Valladolid and James Madison University (Virginia, USA) where she gives workshops, conferences and seminars. She has written for magazines and has published several books and articles about narrative and screenwriting.

In 2010, Ortiz founded Poppy Films with Kike Mora, Raúl García and Jesús Bosqued.

She is a member of the managerial board of PEAK (Assembly of Women Film-makers of Spain) and co-founder and vice-president of EWA Network (European Women Audiovisual Network).

== Filmography ==
=== Feature films ===
- Chrysalis (2011).
- The Bride (2014).
- Across the River and into the Trees (2022)
- Teresa (2023)
- The Red Virgin (2024)

=== Short films ===
- History Explained in Five Minutes (2001).
- If I Could, I'd Go out for a Stroll Every Night (2002).
- Family Photos (2005).
- The Face of Ido (2008).
- The Gap of Tristán Boj (2008).

== Prizes ==
=== Goya Awards ===
Year	Category	Film	Result
2011	Best New Director	Chrysalis	Nominated

=== Seminci Awards ===
Year	Category	Film	Result
2011	Pilar Miró Prize for Best New Director	Chrysalis	Won
