= ACME Comic Con =

Bi-annual fan convention in Glasgow

Coordinates: 55°51′38″N 4°17′19″W

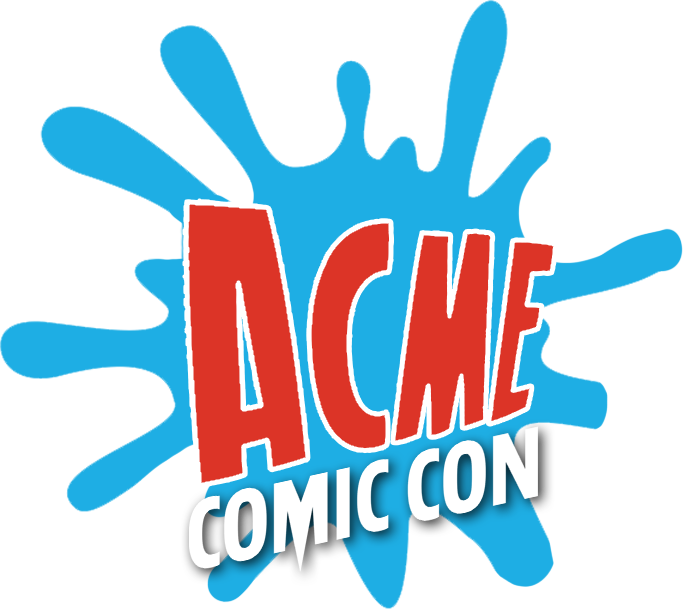
- Status: Inactive
- Genre: Multigenre
- Venue: SEC Centre
- Locations: Glasgow, Scotland
- Inaugurated: March 5, 2022; 4 years ago
- Most recent: September 28, 2024; 2 years ago
- Next event: March 8, 2025; 19 months ago
- Organiser: Attic Convention and Media Events
- Website: www.acmecomiccon.com

ACME Comic Con was a bi-annual fan convention held at the Scottish Events Campus in Glasgow, Scotland. It was organised by Attic Convention and Media Events.

== History ==
Before 2020 a Comic Convention called MCM Scotland (an offshoot of MCM London) was held at the SEC since 2013. Due to the COVID-19 pandemic and a restructuring of MCM after a buyout from Reedpop, MCM scaled back their UK conventions to just MCM London and MCM Birmingham. ACME (who organised Rai Con for several years prior) announced they would be taking over hosting a comic con event at the SEC with two events, one in March and one in September.

ACME Comic Con hosted its first Convention in Halls 1 & 2 of the Scottish Events Campus on the 5th and 6 March 2022, It then hosted its second event in Hall 4 on 24 and 25 September 2022. In 2024 the March event moved from Halls 1 & 2 to Hall 3 and the September event expanded from Hall 4 into Hall 3.

== Show Features ==
=== Main Stage ===
Stage where Guests are interviewed and in stage panels and Cosplay Competitions are held.

=== C3 Cosplay City Championship ===
A competition for cosplayers to show off their creative costume skills.

=== Wrestling Ring ===
A wrestling ring that wrestlers use to compete for the ACME wrestling belt.

=== Vendor & Artist Alley ===
Area for small business to sell and interact with customers.

=== Guests ===
A variety of Guests are invited to each convention for fans to meet and to sell autographs and photo opportunities. They also participate in panels at the Main Stage to be interviewed in front of an audience.

=== Superhero Academy ===
A children's area.

=== Gaming Zone ===
An area for attendees to play retro video games, board games and trading card games.

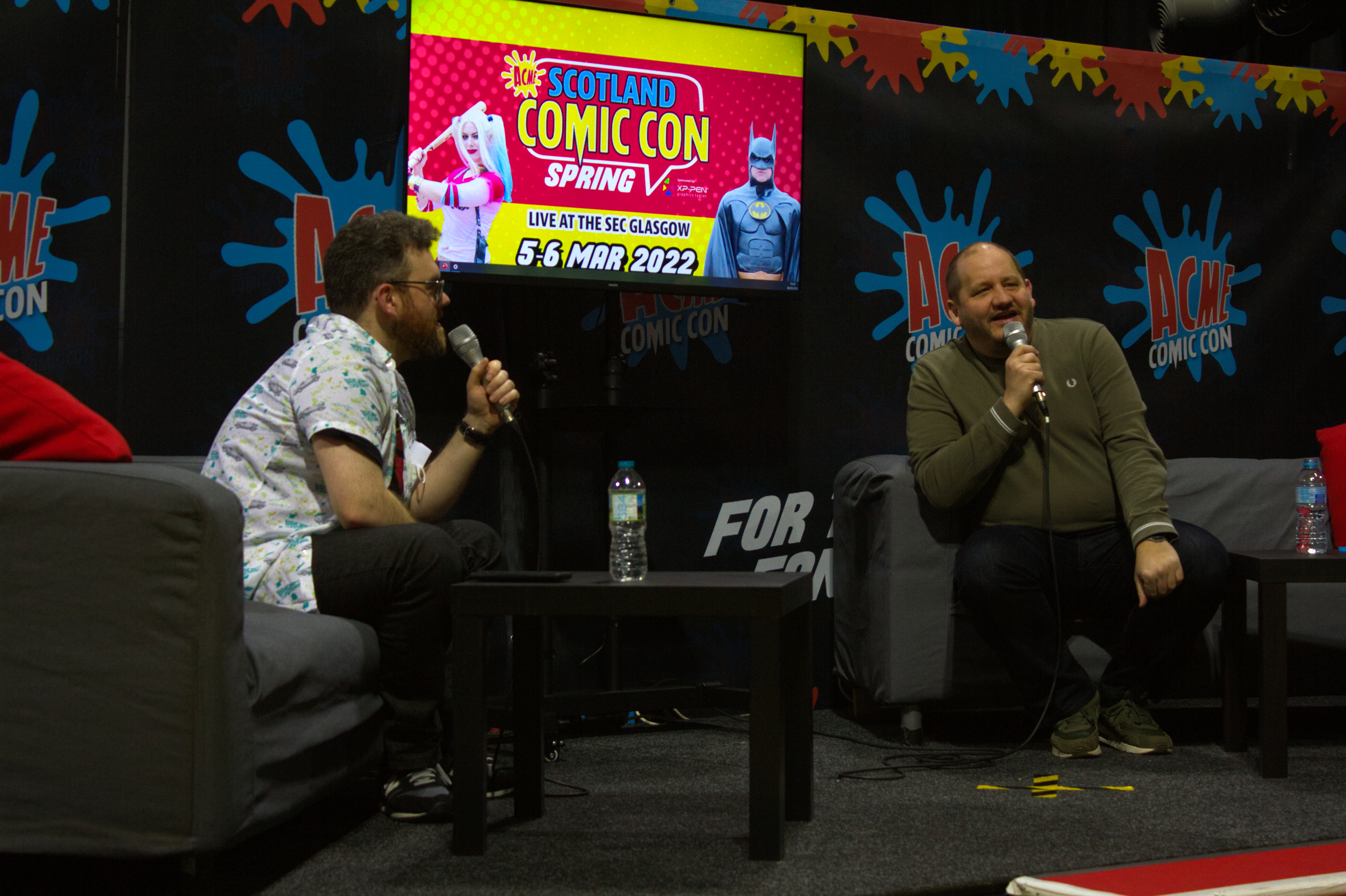
Tony Way Speaking at ACME Comic Con Spring 2022

== Dates ==
Dates	Notable Guests
March 5–6, 2022	Andy Secombe, Arti Shah, Tony Way
September 24–25, 2022	Dominique McElligott, Gavin Mitchell, Jane McCarry, Paul Riley, Sanjeev Kholi, Mark Cox, Matt Costello
March 4–5, 2023	Gemma Whelan, James Mackenzie, Natalie Gumede, Ruby Stokes, Dave Gibbons, Tim Pilcher, Etienne Kuwabo, Sonia Leong
September 23–24, 2023	Anna Shaffer, Chris Barrie, Christina Chong, Ed Speleers, Eric Stuart, Gavin Mitchell, James Mackenzie, John Wagner, Martin Quinn, Nigel Parkinson, Royce Pierreson, Therica Wilson-Read
March 9-10, 2024	Sylvester McCoy, Sophie Aldred, Maggie Service, Colin Ryan, Beth Walker, Shauna MacDonald, John Higgins, Dan McDaid, Andy Diggle
September 28-29, 2024	Billie Piper, Andrew Wincott, Emma Gregory, Tim Downie, Tracy Wiles, Marta Svetek, Katy Townsend, Daniel Weyman, Hattie Hayridge, Doug Naylor
