= Enrique López Lavigne =

Spanish film producer

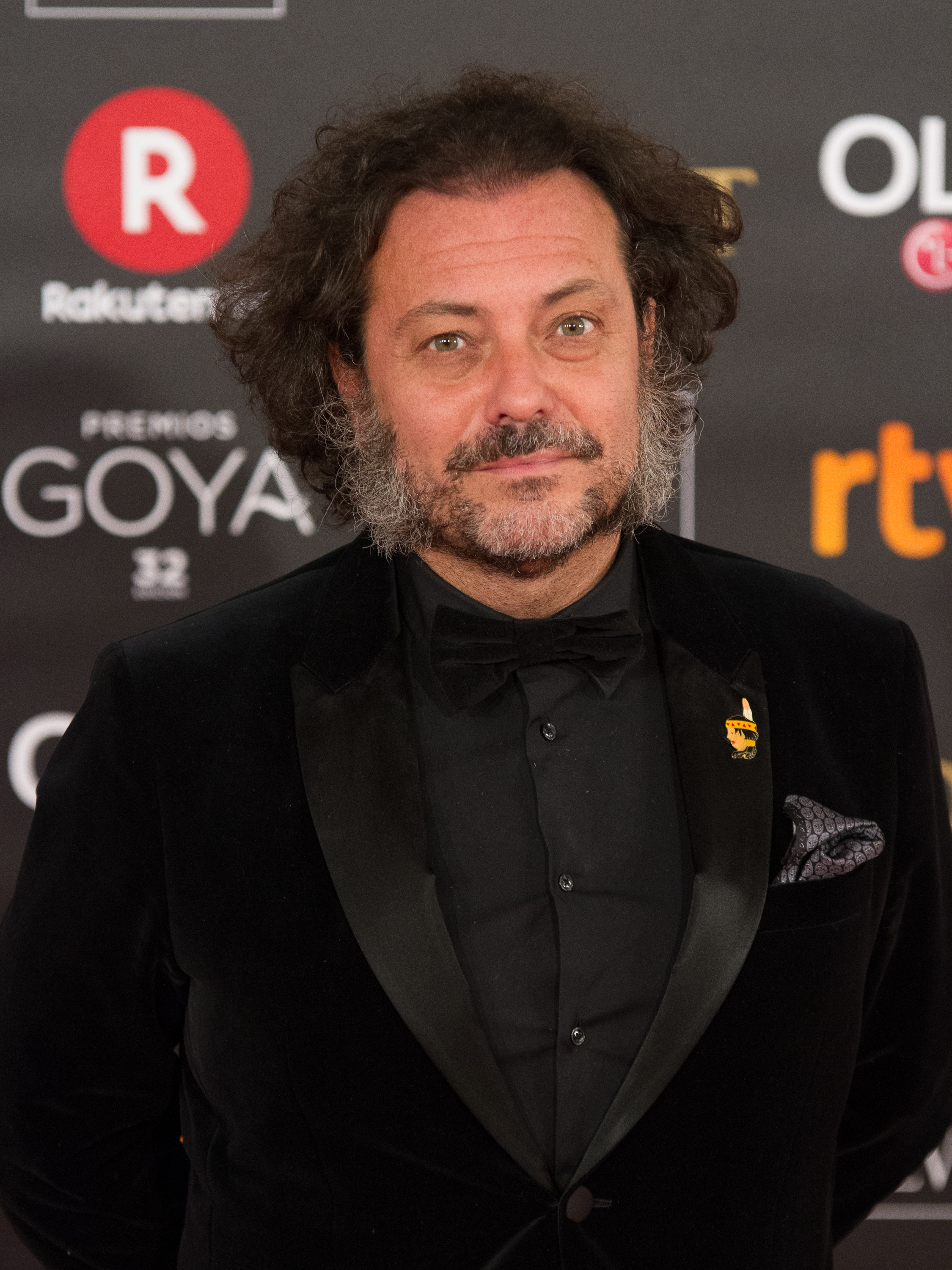
- At the 32nd Goya Awards in 2018
- Born: Enrique López Lavigne; 1967 (age 58–59); Madrid, Spain
- Occupation: Film producer

Enrique López Lavigne (born 1967) is a film producer with an extensive work in Spanish cinema. He is a founder of Apache Films and Apaches Entertainment as well as El Estudio.

== Biography ==
Enrique López Lavigne was born in Madrid in 1967, son to a Spanish father and a French mother. He studied law at the Complutense University of Madrid and then worked for a year as a lawyer in Paris. He began his career in media when he was 25 years old, entering to work for Sogecable and Canal+. Later in time he came to co-found Apaches Entertainment alongside Belén Atienza.

A prolific producer of Spanish films, his credits include works such as El asombroso mundo de Borjamari y Pocholo (also co-director), Sex and Lucia, 28 Weeks Later, The Impossible, Holy Camp!, Selfie, Gold, Veronica, and The Grandmother. In 2020, he was invited to membership in the AMPAS.

Together with Pablo Cruz and Diego Suárez Chialvo, he co-founded El Estudio, a production company with activity in Mexico, Spain and the United States. In 2024, he teamed up with Goodfellas to launch the joint production venture Goodapatxe.
