= Sandra Escacena =

Spanish actress

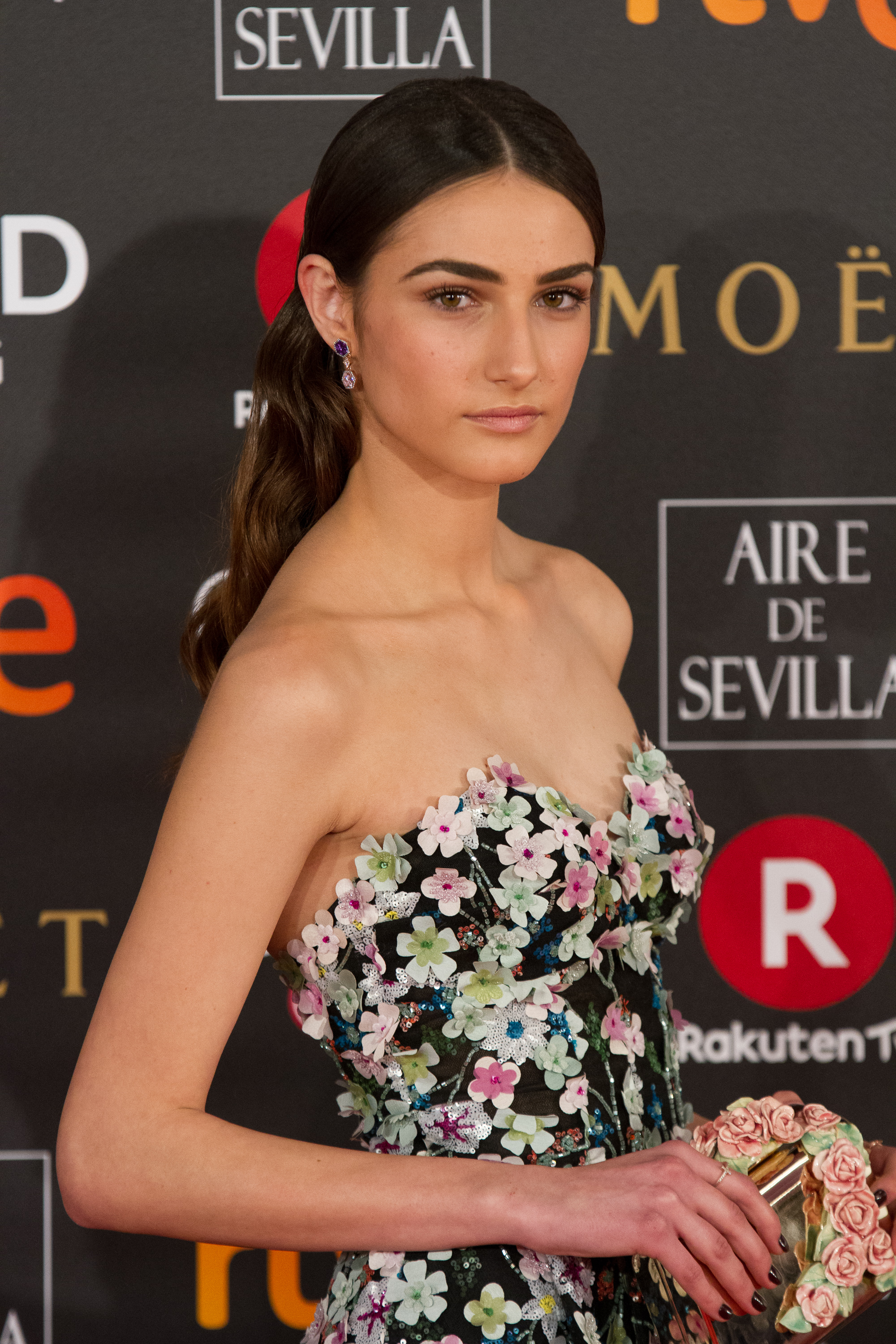
- Escacena at the 2018 Goya Awards
- Born: 30 March 2001 (age 24); Madrid, Spain
- Occupation: Actress
- Years active: 2017-Present
- Known for: Veronica (2017)
- Height: 1.7 m (5 ft 7 in)
- Awards: Goya Awards 2017 Nomination

Sandra Escacena (born 30 March 2001) is a Spanish actress, known for her starring role in the movie Veronica, a 2017 Spanish horror thriller film directed by Paco Plaza.

== Career ==
Between 2009 and 2012 Escacena studied theater at the School S.V. Performing Productions of Villaviciosa de Odón and between 2012 and 2014 in the Municipal School of Dramatic Art of Madrid. Since 2015 she has attended theater classes at the Primera Toma school in Madrid. During these years she has participated in various plays.

In 2016, at the suggestion of the casting director Arantza Velez, she auditioned to play Veronica in the film directed by Paco Plaza, and was finally chosen for the role. In December 2017 she was nominated for the Goya Award for the Best New Actress and for the Feroz Award for the Best Main Actress in a Film for her performance.

== Filmography ==
=== Cinema ===
Films
Year	Title	Director
2017	Verónica	Paco Plaza
2017	The Same (short)	Paco Plaza & Portsmouth FC
2025	V/H/S/Halloween	Paco Plaza

=== Theater ===
Plays
Year	Title	Role
2010	La otra historia de Caperucita Roja	Madre de Caperucita
2011	Blancanieves	Blancanieves
2012	Nunca un Príncipe Azul	Don Quijote de la Mancha
2013	La muy fogosa historia de Miguel Costilla	Flor y Comadre
2014	Romeo y Julieta	Julieta

== Awards ==
Year	Prize	Category	Production	Result
2017	Cinepocalypse Festival	Best Actress	Veronica	Won
2018	Goya Awards	Best New Actress	Veronica	Nominated
2018	Premios Feroz	Best Main Actress in a Film	Veronica	Nominated
