= Consuelo Trujillo =

Spanish actress

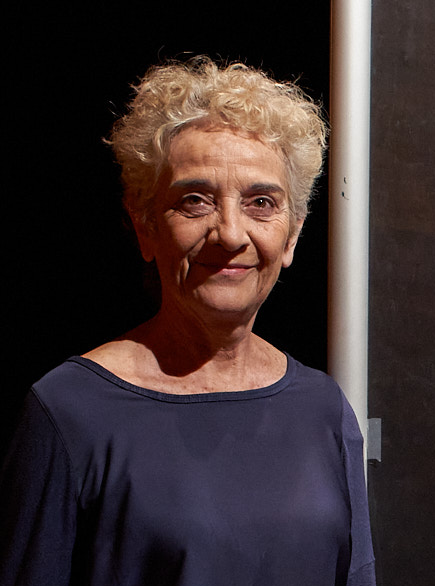
- Trujillo in 2024
- Born: Consuelo Trujillo Urbano; La Línea de la Concepción, Spain
- Occupation(s): Actress, director, teacher
- Partner: Susi Sánchez
- Awards: Actors Union Award (2014, 2016)

Consuelo Trujillo Urbano is a Spanish actress, acting teacher, and theater director.

== Biography ==
Trujillo won the Actors Union Award for Best Supporting Actress in 2014 for the play Cuando deje de llover, and for Best Theatrical Actress in 2016 for Criatura. She has also appeared in productions such as Blood Wedding, Doña Rosita the Spinster, The House of Bernarda Alba, and Medea. In film she has had roles in The Bride, Al sur de Granada, Yo, también, and Verónica.

She is an acting teacher at the Juan Carlos Corazza academy and her classes have included students such as Javier Bardem and Elena Anaya.

She is the romantic partner of actress Susi Sánchez. The two met while appearing in Blood Wedding in 1986. They have been outspoken advocates of LGBT rights, acting in plays such as The Laramie Project and appearing at several gay pride events together.
