= Aisling Franciosi =

Irish-Italian actress

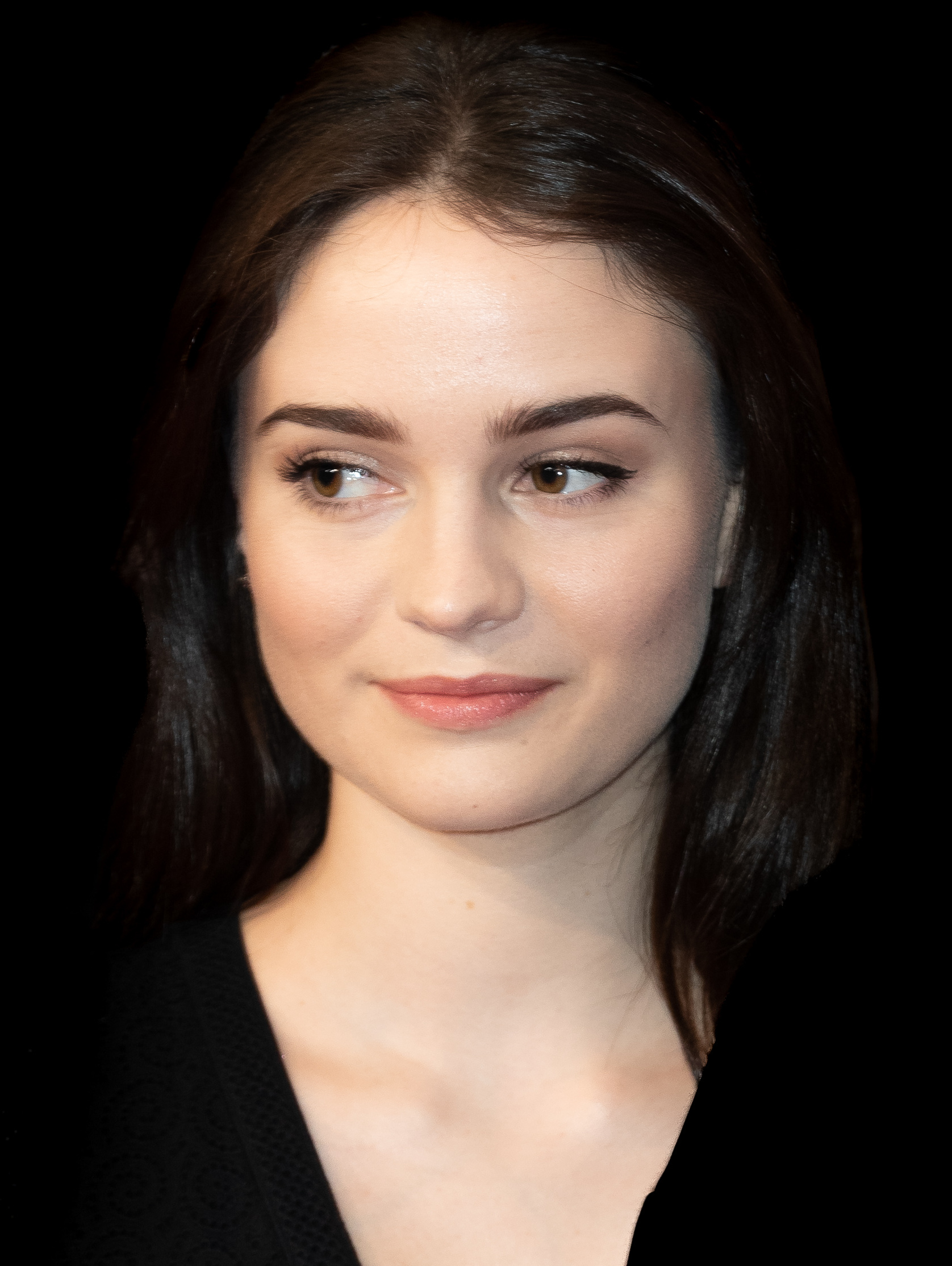
- Franciosi in 2019
- Born: 6 June 1993 (age 33); Dublin, Ireland
- Occupation: Actress
- Years active: 2012–present

Aisling Franciosi (/ˈæʃlɪŋ frænˈtʃoʊzi/ ASH-ling fran-CHOH-zee, Italian: [ˈɛʃliŋɡ franˈtʃoːzi]; born 6 June 1993) is an Irish-Italian actress. She won an AACTA Award for her leading role in the film The Nightingale (2018). On television, she is known for her roles in the RTÉ–BBC Two crime drama The Fall (2013–2016), season 2 of the TNT series Legends (2015), and the BBC One miniseries Black Narcissus (2020).

== Early and personal life ==
Aisling Franciosi was born on 6 June 1993 at the Rotunda Hospital in Dublin, Ireland, the daughter of an Irish mother from Meath and an Italian father from Milan, who had met when her mother was working as an English teacher in his city; her father is a heart surgeon. She has two older brothers and a younger sister. After her birth, the family spent a few years in Italy, until her parents divorced and the children followed their mother to Dublin, where they were raised; Italy remained their holiday destination, with Franciosi still frequently visiting her father in Milan.

Franciosi studied French and Spanish at Trinity College Dublin, but left before graduating; she is a native bilingual speaker of English and Italian. She is also a singer and has performed post-synchronised dialogue recording for a few Italian actresses in English.

== Career ==
From 2013 to 2016, Franciosi starred as Katie Benedetto in the RTÉ and BBC Two crime drama series The Fall. She made her feature film debut in 2014 in Jimmy's Hall. The following year, she starred in the second season of the TNT series Legends as Kate Crawford.

In 2016, Franciosi appeared in the HBO series Game of Thrones in the sixth season as Lyanna Stark and reprised her role in the seventh season. She landed the lead role of Clare Carroll in The Nightingale, a 2018 period drama set in Tasmania and directed by Jennifer Kent. For The Nightingale, Francioisi received critical acclaim and a number of accolades, including an AACTA. She also had supporting and recurring roles in season 1 of the BBC thriller Clique as Georgia Cunningham and in the Picasso instalment of the National Geographic anthology Genius as Fernande Olivier.

Franciosi played Sister Ruth in the 2020 miniseries Black Narcissus opposite Gemma Arterton. Since then, she has appeared in the films Home, The Unforgivable, God's Creatures, The Last Voyage of the Demeter, Stopmotion, Speak No Evil, and Turn Up The Sun!.

== Filmography ==
=== Film ===
Key
†	Denotes films that have not yet been released

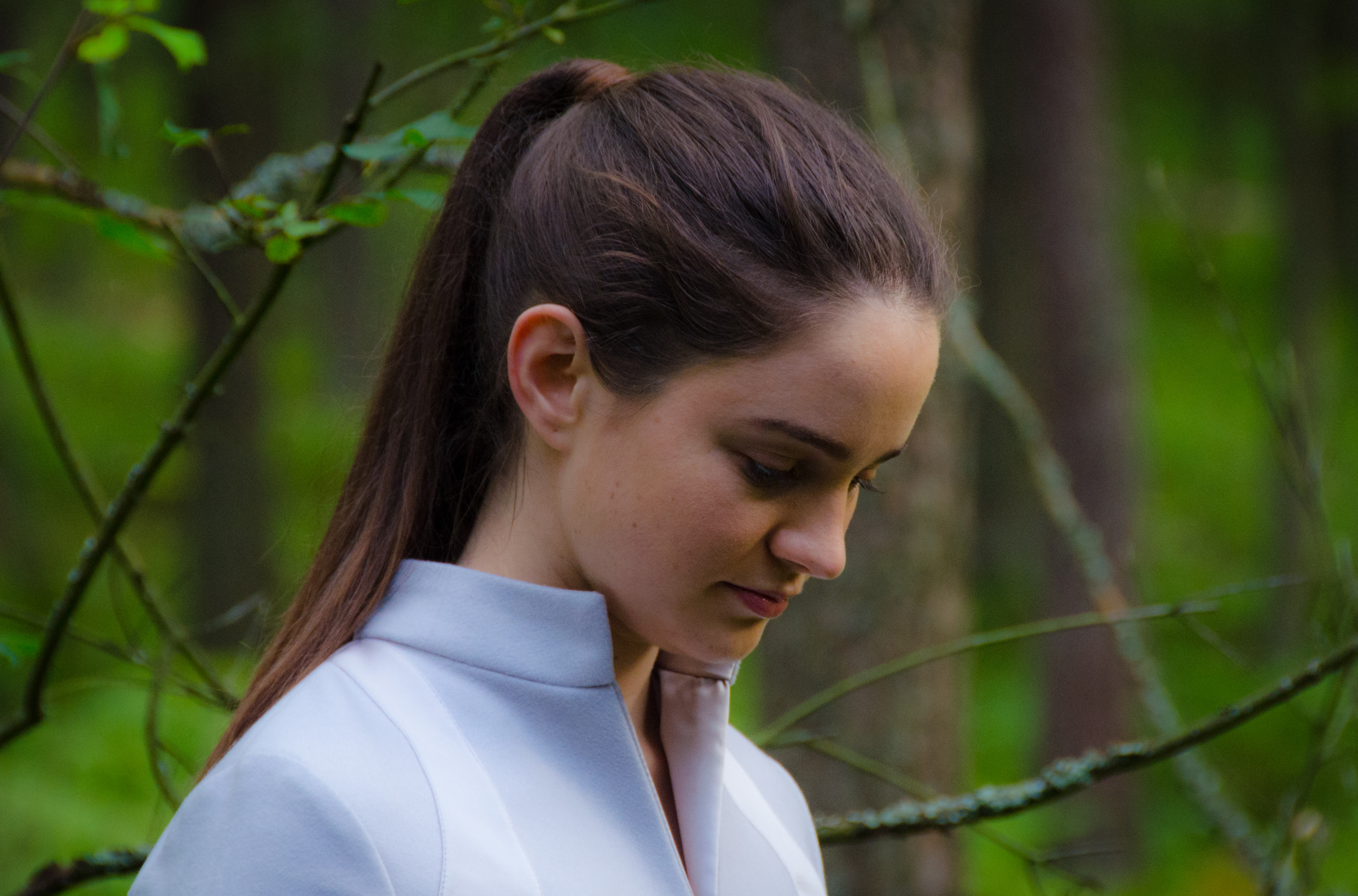
Franciosi in 2016

Year	Title	Role	Notes
2014	Jimmy's Hall	Marie	
2014	Ambition	Apprentice	Short film for the European Space Agency Rosetta mission
2016	Ambition – Epilogue	Master	Short film for the ESA Rosetta mission
2016	The Sticks	Sarah	Short film
2018	The Nightingale	Clare Carroll	
2020	Home	Delta	
2021	The Unforgivable	Katherine "Katie" Malcolm / Katie Slater	
2022	God's Creatures	Sarah Murphy	
2023	The Last Voyage of the Demeter	Anna	
2023	Stopmotion	Ella Blake	
2024	Speak No Evil	Ciara	
2025	Twinless	Marcie	
2025	Pose	Patricia	

=== Television ===
Year	Title	Role	Notes
2012	Trivia	Trish	Episode 2.5
2013–2016	The Fall	Katie Benedetto	Main role
2014	Quirke	Phoebe Griffin	3 episodes
2015	Vera	Sigourney O'Brien	Episode: "Muddy Waters"
2015	Legends	Kate Crawford	Main role (season 2)
2016–2017	Game of Thrones	Lyanna Stark	Episodes: "The Winds of Winter", "The Dragon and the Wolf"
2017	Clique	Georgia Cunningham	Recurring role (series 1)
2018	Genius: Picasso	Fernande Olivier	Recurring role (season 2)
2020	I Know This Much Is True	Young Dessa Constantine	Miniseries
2020	Black Narcissus	Sister Ruth	Miniseries
2023–2024	The Legend of Vox Machina	Kaylie (voice)	Season 2 (4 episodes); Season 3 (6 episodes); Season 4 (1 episode)
2025	The Abandons	Trisha Van Ness	Main role

== Awards and nominations ==
Year	Award	Category	Work	Result	Ref.
2015	Irish Film & Television Awards	Best Actress in a Supporting Role – Drama	The Fall	Won	
2019	Gotham Awards	Breakthrough Performer	The Nightingale	Nominated	
2019	Detroit Film Critics Society	Best Breakthrough Performance	The Nightingale	Nominated	
2019	AACTA Awards	Best Actress in a Leading Role	The Nightingale	Won	
2019	Chicago Film Critics Association	Most Promising Performer	The Nightingale	Won	
2019	Dublin Film Critics' Circle	Breakthrough Performance	The Nightingale	Won	
2020	Alliance of Women Film Journalists	Most Daring Performance	The Nightingale	Won	
2020	Irish Film & Television Awards	Best Actress in a Lead Role – Film	The Nightingale	Nominated	
2020	Irish Film & Television Awards	Rising Star	—	Won	
2021	Irish Film & Television Awards	Best Actress in a Lead Role – Drama	Black Narcissus	Nominated	
2022	British Independent Film Awards	Best Supporting Performance	God's Creatures	Nominated	
2023	Irish Film & Television Awards	Best Actress in a Supporting Role – Film	God's Creatures	Nominated	

== See also ==
- List of Irish actors
