= Leticia Dolera =

Spanish actress

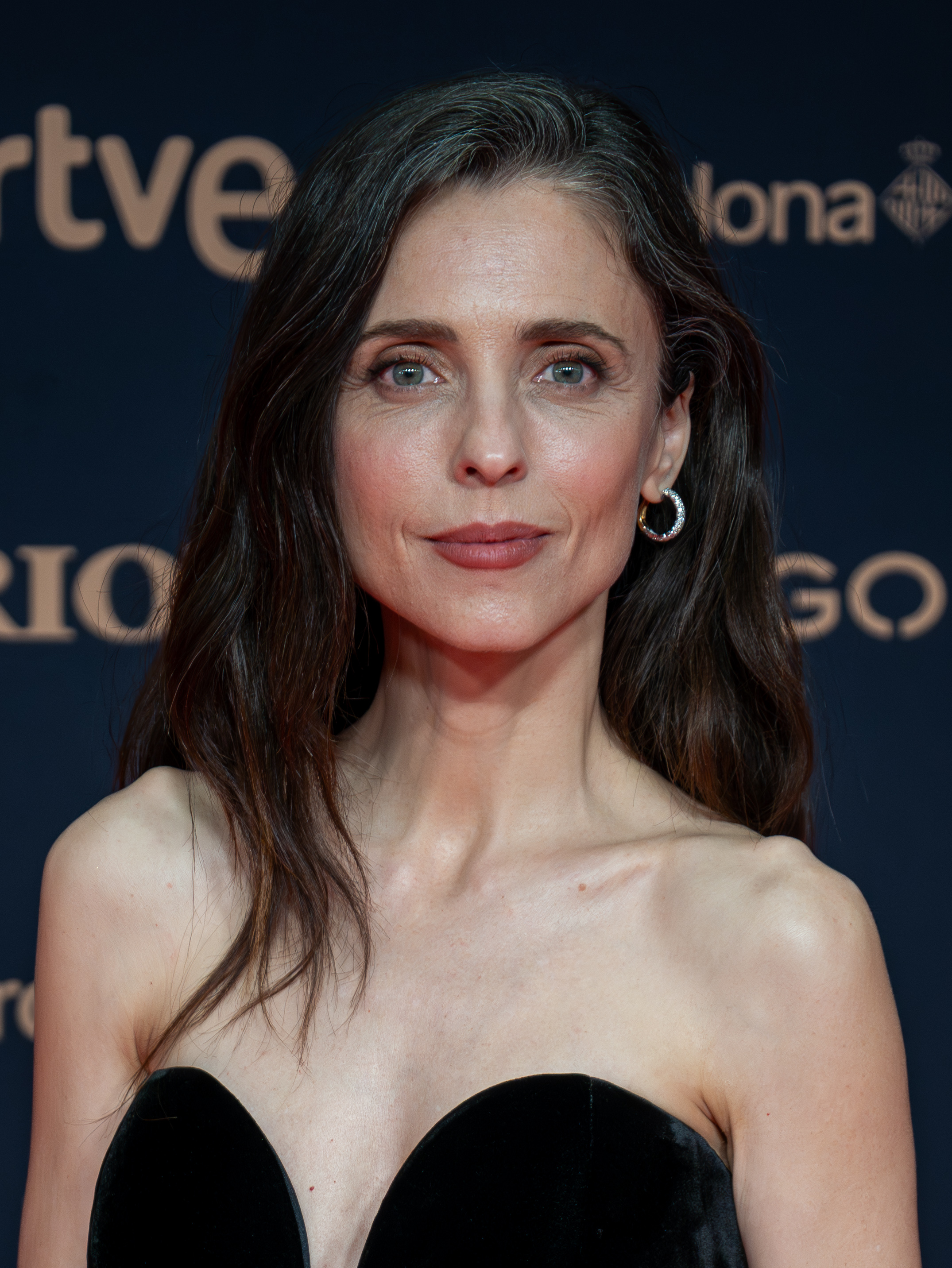
- Dolera in 2026
- Born: 23 October 1981 (age 44); Barcelona, Catalonia, Spain
- Occupations: Actress; screenwriter; director
- Years active: 2001–present

Leticia Dolera (born 23 October 1981) is a Spanish actress, screenwriter, and director. She is best known for her roles as Clara in the 2013 horror film REC 3: Genesis, Teresa in Imagining Argentina (2003), and as Carmen in the UK television series Mad Dogs.

== Early life ==
Leticia Dolera was born in Barcelona on 23 October 1981 to a single mother.

== Career ==
Her career began with the series Al salir de clase (When Class Is Over), in which she played the role of Angela between 2000 and 2002. Likewise, she made her feature film debut as an actress in Bellas durmientes (2001).

From there, she began a film career with titles such as The Other Side of the Bed, Imagining Argentina, Semen, A Love Story and Man Push Cart, a film which received three nominations at the Independent Spirit Awards.

In 2012, she starred in the third instalment of the REC series, receiving critical praise for her performance.

In the UK, she is best known for playing the character of Carmen in the Sky TV series, Mad Dogs (2012 to 2014).

In 2015 she wrote and directed the film Requirements To Be A Normal Person.

In February 2018 she published the book about feminism Morder la manzana. La revolución será feminista o no será. She was asked to open the La Mercè festival in Barcelona in 2018. She shared her time with Carmen Juares, a migrant from Honduras, who had spent six years in Spain as a caregiver. Juares was caring for a woman with dementia in conditions that she regarded as slavery.

In October 2019 premiered in Movistar+ the television series Vida perfecta, directed by and starring her, with good acceptance by critics. Public scrutiny and controversy around the production of the series (then tentatively titled Déjate llevar) began in 2018, when actress Aina Clotet denounced on Twitter that Dolera had decided not to hire her for the series because Clotet was pregnant.

== Personal life ==
In 2008, Dolera married director Paco Plaza, from whom she is separated.

== Filmography ==
=== Films ===
Year	Title	Role	Notes	Ref.
2001	Bellas durmientes		Feature film debut	
2002	El otro lado de la cama (The Other Side of the Bed)			
2003	Besos de gato	Carlota		
2003	The Emperor's Wife			
2003	Imagining Argentina	Teresa		
2005	Semen, una historia de amor (Semen, A Love Story)	Ariadna / Penélope		
2005	Man Push Cart	Noemi		
2008	Prime Time	Elena		
2009	Imago Mortis	Leilou		
2011	De tu ventana a la mía (Chrysalis)	Violeta		
2012	[REC 3]: Génesis	Clara		
2013	Los últimos días (The Last Days)	Andrea		
2014	Kamikaze	Natalia		
2015	Requisitos para ser una persona normal (Requirements to Be a Normal Person)	María de las Montañas Enríquez Conde	Also writer-director	
2015	La novia (The Bride)	Mujer de Leonardo ('Leonardo's wife')		
2017	Verónica (Veronica)			
2019	¿Qué te juegas? (Get Her... If You Can)	Isabel		

=== Television ===
- Xat.Tv
- Al salir de clase (2001–2002)
- Hospital Central (2004)
- Los Serrano (2005)
- Pressumptes implicats (2006)
- Petits meurtres en famille (2006)
- El espejo (2007)
- Presumptes implicats (2007) (TV movie)
- Mà morta truca a la porta (2007)
- Guante blanco (2008)
- Mad Dogs (2012)
- El Barco (2013)
- Cero en Historia (2018)
- Vida perfecta (2019)
- Pubertat (2025)

=== Theatre ===
- Las alegres comadres de Windsor

=== Short films ===
- La amenaza del fantasma
- Pum Pum, ¿Quién es?
- Habitaciones separadas
- La bufanda verde
- Cuál es la fecha de tu cumpleaños

=== Music videos ===
- Keane - "Disconnected"
