= Actors and Actresses Union Awards =

Spanish annual award ceremony

- Awarded for: Merits of Spanish film, television and theatre performances
- Country: Spain
- Presented by: Actors and Actresses Union
- First award: 1991

The Actors and Actresses Union Awards (Spanish: Premios de la Unión de Actores y Actrices) is an annual award ceremony organised by the Spanish Actors and Actresses Union, recognising the best performances in Spanish cinema, television and theatre since 1991. It also awards a generic award to the best new actor and actress (in any media) and, since the 28th edition, an award category to the best actor and actress in an international production. The 30th edition, scheduled to take place in 2021, skipped that year and was moved forward to 14 March 2022, expected to be held at the Circo Price.

== Editions ==
- 1st (1992)
- 2nd (1993)
- 3rd (1994)
- 4th (1995)
- 5th (1996)
- 6th (1997)
- 7th (1998)
- 8th (1999)
- 9th (2000)
- 10th (2001)
- 11th (2002)
- 12th (2003)
- 13th (2004)
- 14th (2005)
- 15th (2006)
- 16th (12 February 2007)
- 17th (31 March 2008)
- 18th (9 March 2009)
- 19th (20 March 2010)
- 20th (31 October 2011)
- 21st (18 June 2012)
- 22nd (3 June 2013)
- 23rd (10 March 2014)
- 24th (9 March 2015)
- 25th (14 March 2016)
- 26th (13 March 2017)
- 27th (12 March 2018)
- 28th (11 March 2019)
- 29th (9 March 2020)
- 30th (14 March 2022)
- 31st (13 March 2023)
- 32nd (11 March 2024)
- 33rd (10 March 2025)
- 34th (16 March 2026)

== Film ==
Edition	Category	(Non-gendered) performer (work)		Ref.
10th (2001)	Leading Performance	Carmen Maura (La comunidad)		
10th (2001)	Leading Performance	Lydia Bosch (You're the One)		
10th (2001)	Leading Performance	Adriana Ozores (Plenilunio)		
10th (2001)	Secondary Performance	Emilio Gutiérrez Caba (La comunidad)		
10th (2001)	Secondary Performance	Manuel Morón (El bola)		
10th (2001)	Secondary Performance	Pepa Pedroche (The Other Side)		
10th (2001)	Minor Performance	Terele Pávez (La comunidad)		
10th (2001)	Minor Performance	Gloria Muñoz (El bola)		
10th (2001)	Minor Performance	Guillermo Toledo (The Other Side)		
11th (2002)	Leading Performance	Pilar López de Ayala (Mad Love)		
11th (2002)	Leading Performance	Paz Vega (Sex and Lucia)		
11th (2002)	Leading Performance	Victoria Abril (Don't Tempt Me)		
11th (2002)	Secondary Performance	Elena Anaya (Sex and Lucia)		
11th (2002)	Secondary Performance	Najwa Nimri (Sex and Lucia)		
11th (2002)	Secondary Performance	Rosana Pastor (Mad Love)		
11th (2002)	Minor Performance	Rosa María Sardá (No Shame)		
11th (2002)	Minor Performance	Javier Cámara (Sex and Lucia)		
11th (2002)	Minor Performance	Susi Sánchez (Mad Love)		
Edition	Category	Actor (work)	Actress (work)	Ref.
12th (2003)	Leading Performance	Javier Bardem (Mondays in the Sun)	Mercedes Sampietro (Common Ground)	
12th (2003)	Secondary Performance	Luis Tosar (Mondays in the Sun)	Nieve de Medina (Mondays in the Sun)	
12th (2003)	Minor Performance	Joaquín Climent (Mondays in the Sun)	Mariola Fuentes (Talk to Her)	
13th (2004)	Leading Performance	Luis Tosar (Take My Eyes)	Laia Marull (Take My Eyes)	
13th (2004)	Secondary Performance	Eduard Fernández (In the City)	Candela Peña (Take My Eyes)	
13th (2004)	Minor Performance	Secun de la Rosa (Football Days)	Leonor Watling (My Life Without Me)	
14th (2005)	Leading Performance	Javier Bardem (The Sea Inside)	Adriana Ozores (Héctor)	
14th (2005)	Secondary Performance	Celso Bugallo (The Sea Inside)	Lola Dueñas (The Sea Inside)	
14th (2005)	Minor Performance	Javier Cámara (Bad Education)	Victoria Abril (The 7th Day)	
15th (2006)	Leading Performance	Manuel Alexandre (Elsa & Fred)	Candela Peña (Princesses)	
15th (2006)	Secondary Performance	Eduard Fernández (The Method)	Elvira Mínguez (Tapas)	
15th (2006)	Minor Performance	Luis Callejo (Princesses)	Adriana Ozores (The Method)	
16th (2007)	Leading Performance	Juan Diego (Go Away from Me)	Penélope Cruz (Volver)	
16th (2007)	Secondary Performance	Antonio de la Torre (Dark Blue Almost Black)	Blanca Portillo (Volver)	
16th (2007)	Minor Performance	Manuel Morón (The Night of the Sunflowers)	Chus Lampreave (Volver)	
17th (2008)	Leading Performance	Alfredo Landa (Sunday Light)	Petra Martínez (Solitary Fragments)	
17th (2008)	Secondary Performance	Raúl Arévalo (Seven Billiard Tables)	Nuria González (Mataharis)	
17th (2008)	Minor Performance	José Manuel Cervino (13 Roses)	Geraldine Chaplin (The Orphanage)	
18th (2009)	Leading Performance	Mariano Venancio (Camino)	Carme Elías (Camino)	
18th (2009)	Secondary Performance	Jordi Dauder (Camino)	Ana Wagener (My Prison Yard)	
18th (2009)	Minor Performance	José Ángel Egido (The Blind Sunflowers)	Lola Casamayor (Camino)	
19th (2010)	Leading Performance	Luis Tosar (Cell 211)	Lola Dueñas (Yo, también)	
19th (2010)	Secondary Performance	Carlos Bardem (Cell 211)	Verónica Sánchez (Fat People)	
19th (2010)	Minor Performance	Fernando Albizu (Fat People)	Pilar Castro (Fat People)	
20th (2011)	Leading Performance	Javier Bardem (Biutiful)	Sonsoles Benedicto (La vida empieza hoy)	
20th (2011)	Secondary Performance	Víctor Clavijo (18 Meals)	Ana Wagener (Biutiful)	
20th (2011)	Minor Performance	Antonio de la Torre (Lope)	Pilar López de Ayala (Lope)	
21st (2012)	Leading Performance	José Coronado (No Rest for the Wicked)	María León (The Sleeping Voice)	
21st (2012)	Secondary Performance	Raúl Arévalo (Cousinhood)	Ana Wagener (The Sleeping Voice)	
21st (2012)	Minor Performance	Antonio de la Torre (Cousinhood)	Petra Martínez (Sleep Tight)	
22nd (2013)	Leading Performance	Antonio de la Torre (Unit 7)	Maribel Verdú (Snow White)	
22nd (2013)	Secondary Performance	Julián Villagrán (Unit 7)	Candela Peña (A Gun in Each Hand)	
22nd (2013)	Minor Performance	Alfonso Sánchez (Unit 7)	Amparo Baró (Maktub)	
23rd (2014)	Leading Performance	Antonio de la Torre (Cannibal)	Susi Sánchez (10.000 noches en ninguna parte)	
23rd (2014)	Secondary Performance	Roberto Álamo (Family United)	Belén López (15 Years and One Day)	
23rd (2014)	Minor Performance	Dani Muriel (Diamantes negros)	Alicia Rubio (Family United)	
24th (2015)	Leading Performance	Javier Gutiérrez (Marshland)	Elena Anaya (Todos están muertos)	
24th (2015)	Secondary Performance	Karra Elejalde (Spanish Affair)	Carmen Machi (Spanish Affair)	
24th (2015)	Minor Performance	Manolo Solo (Marshland)	Mercedes León (Marshland)	
25th (2016)	Leading Performance	Pedro Casablanc (B, la película)	Inma Cuesta (The Bride)	
25th (2016)	Secondary Performance	Felipe García Vélez (Nothing in Return)	Luisa Gavasa (The Bride)	
25th (2016)	Minor Performance	Manolo Solo (B, la película)	Ana Fernández (The Bride)	
26th (2017)	Leading Performance	Luis Callejo (The Fury of a Patient Man)	Carmen Machi (La puerta abierta)	
26th (2017)	Secondary Performance	Carlos Santos (Smoke & Mirrors)	Candela Peña (Kiki, Love to Love)	
26th (2017)	Minor Performance	Manolo Solo (The Fury of a Patient Man)	Pilar Gómez (The Fury of a Patient Man)	
27th (2018)	Leading Performance	Javier Gutiérrez (The Motive)	Nathalie Poza (Can't Say Goodbye)	
27th (2018)	Secondary Performance	Juan Diego (Can't Say Goodbye)	Adelfa Calvo (The Motive)	
27th (2018)	Minor Performance	Jorge Usón (Uncertain Glory)	Geraldine Chaplin (Anchor and Hope)	
28th (2019)	Leading Performance	Antonio de la Torre (The Realm)	Susi Sánchez (Sunday's Illness)	
28th (2019)	Secondary Performance	Juan Margallo (Champions)	Ana Wagener (The Realm)	
28th (2019)	Minor Performance	Luis Bermejo (Your Son)	Elvira Mínguez (Everybody Knows)	
29th (2020)	Leading Performance	Karra Elejalde (While at War)	Belén Cuesta (The Endless Trench)	
29th (2020)	Secondary Performance	Asier Etxeandia (Pain and Glory)	Nathalie Poza (While at War)	
29th (2020)	Minor Performance	Leonardo Sbaraglia (Pain and Glory)	Julieta Serrano (Pain and Glory)	

== Television ==
Edition	Category	Actor (work)	Actress (work)	Ref.
12th (2003)	Leading Performance	Juan Diego (Padre coraje)	Amparo Baró (7 vidas)	
12th (2003)	Secondary Performance	Pedro Casablanc (Policía)	Terele Pávez (Cuéntame cómo pasó)	
12th (2003)	Minor Performance	Luis Cuenca (Cuéntame cómo pasó)	Chiqui Fernández (Periodistas)	
13th (2004)	Leading Performance	Fernando Tejero (Aquí no hay quien viva)	Amparo Baró (7 vidas)	
13th (2004)	Secondary Performance	Luis Merlo (Aquí no hay quien viva)	Malena Alterio (Aquí no hay quien viva)	
13th (2004)	Minor Performance	Toni Leblanc (Cuéntame cómo pasó)	Alicia Hermida (Cuéntame cómo pasó)	
14th (2005)	Leading Performance	Gonzalo de Castro (7 vidas)	María Adánez (Aquí no hay quien viva)	
14th (2005)	Secondary Performance	Eduardo Gómez (Aquí no hay quien viva)	Carmen Machi (7 vidas)	
14th (2005)	Minor Performance	Guillermo Ortega (Aquí no hay quien viva)	Mariví Bilbao (Aquí no hay quien viva)	
16th (2007)	Leading Performance	José Luis Gil (Aquí no hay quien viva)	Chiqui Fernández (Mujeres)	
16th (2007)	Secondary Performance	Mariano Peña (Aída)	Inma Cuevas (Mujeres)	
16th (2007)	Minor Performance	Víctor Clavijo (Mujeres)	Gracia Olayo (Mujeres)	
17th (2008)	Leading Performance	Carlos Hipólito (Desaparecida)	Luisa Martín (Desaparecida)	
17th (2008)	Leading Performance	Miguel Ángel Solá (Desaparecida)	Luisa Martín (Desaparecida)	
17th (2008)	Secondary Performance	Ginés García Millán (Herederos)	Petra Martínez (Herederos)	
17th (2008)	Minor Performance	José L. Alcobendas (Amar en tiempos revueltos)	Ana Villa (Amar en tiempos revueltos)	
18th (2009)	Leading Performance	Pepe Viyuela (Aída)	Concha Velasco (Herederos)	
18th (2009)	Secondary Performance	Félix Gómez (Herederos)	Ana Labordeta (Amar en tiempos revueltos)	
18th (2009)	Minor Performance	Luis Varela (Cámera Café)	Berta Ojea (La señora)	
19th (2010)	Leading Performance	Roberto Enríquez (La señora)	Adriana Ugarte (La señora)	
19th (2010)	Secondary Performance	Víctor Clavijo (La señora)	Carmen Conesa (La señora)	
19th (2010)	Minor Performance	Juan Messeguer (La señora)	Pepa Pedroche (Amar en tiempos revueltos)	
20th (2011)	Leading Performance	Javier Albalá (Pelotas)	Adriana Ozores (La duquesa)	
20th (2011)	Secondary Performance	Aitor Luna (Gran Reserva)	Ana Polvorosa (Aída)	
20th (2011)	Minor Performance	Secun de la Rosa (Aída)	Ana Labordeta (Acusados)	
21st (2012)	Leading Performance	Javier Gutiérrez (Águila Roja)	Alicia Borrachero (Crematorio)	
21st (2012)	Secondary Performance	Alejo Sauras (14 de abril. La República)	Juana Acosta (Crematorio)	
21st (2012)	Minor Performance	Álex Angulo (14 de abril. La República)	Chusa Barbero (Crematorio)	
22nd (2013)	Leading Performance	Roberto Enríquez (Hispania, la leyenda)	Adriana Ozores (Gran Hotel)	
22nd (2013)	Secondary Performance	Pedro Casablanc (Isabel)	Concha Velasco (Gran Hotel)	
22nd (2013)	Minor Performance	Joaquín Climent (Amar en tiempos revueltos)	Mariví Bilbao (La que se avecina)	
23rd (2014)	Leading Performance	Emilio Gutiérrez Caba (Gran Reserva)	Adriana Ugarte (The Time in Between)	
23rd (2014)	Secondary Performance	Carlos Santos (The Time in Between)	Elvira Mínguez (The Time in Between)	
23rd (2014)	Minor Performance	Tristán Ulloa (The Time in Between)	Asunción Balaguer (Gran Hotel)	
24th (2015)	Leading Performance	Víctor Clavijo (Cuéntame un cuento: "Los tres cerditos")	Michelle Jenner (Isabel)	
24th (2015)	Secondary Performance	Pepe Viyuela (Aída)	Victoria Abril (Sin identidad)	
24th (2015)	Minor Performance	Carlos Hipólito (Hermanos)	Elvira Mínguez (Sin identidad)	
25th (2016)	Leading Performance	Nacho Fresneda (El ministerio del tiempo)	Maggie Civantos (Locked Up)	
25th (2016)	Secondary Performance	Asier Etxeandia (Velvet)	Susi Sánchez (Carlos, rey emperador)	
25th (2016)	Minor Performance	Ángel Ruiz (El ministerio del tiempo)	Inma Cuevas (Locked Up)	
26th (2017)	Leading Performance	Pedro Casablanc (Mar de plástico)	Aura Garrido (El ministerio del tiempo)	
26th (2017)	Secondary Performance	Julián Villagrán (El ministerio del tiempo)	Alba Flores (Locked Up)	
26th (2017)	Minor Performance	Adrián Lastra (Velvet)	Inma Cuevas (Locked Up)	
27th (2018)	Leading Performance	Nacho Fresneda (El ministerio del tiempo)	Malena Alterio (Vergüenza)	
27th (2018)	Secondary Performance	Pedro Alonso (Money Heist)	Ana Polvorosa (Cable Girls)	
27th (2018)	Minor Performance	Víctor Clavijo (El ministerio del tiempo)	Petra Martínez (La que se avecina)	
28th (2019)	Leading Performance	Álvaro Morte (Money Heist)	Inma Cuesta (Arde Madrid)	
28th (2019)	Secondary Performance	Antonio Durán, "Morris" (Cocaine Coast)	Anna Castillo (Arde Madrid)	
28th (2019)	Minor Performance	Julián Villagrán (Arde Madrid)	Miren Ibarguren (Arde Madrid)	
29th (2020)	Leading Performance	Javier Cámara (Vota Juan)	Candela Peña (Hierro)	
29th (2020)	Secondary Performance	Alejo Sauras (Estoy vivo)	Carmen Ruiz (Matadero)	
29th (2020)	Minor Performance	Fernando Cayo (Money Heist)	Goizalde Núñez (Estoy vivo)	

== Theatre ==
Edition	Category	Actor (work)	Actress (work)	Ref.
12th (2003)	Leading Performance	Josep Maria Flotats (París, 1940)	Kiti Mánver (El matrimonio de Boston)	
12th (2003)	Secondary Performance	Miguel Hermoso (La prueba)	Goizalde Núñez (La gaviota)	
12th (2003)	Minor Performance	Sergio Otegui (La gaviota)	Miriam Montilla (Familia)	
13th (2004)	Leading Performance	Miguel Ángel Solá (Hoy: el diario de Adán y Eva)	Gloria Muñoz (Las bicicletas son para el verano)	
13th (2004)	Secondary Performance	Fernando San Segundo (El burlador de Sevilla)	Blanca Portillo (Como en las mejores familias)	
13th (2004)	Minor Performance	David Lorente (Las bicicletas son para el verano)	Bárbara Goenaga (Historia de una escalera)	
14th (2005)	Leading Performance	Héctor Alterio (Yo, Claudio)	Blanca Portillo (La hija del aire)	
14th (2005)	Secondary Performance	Juanjo Otegui (The Price)	Isabel Pintor (Yo, Claudio)	
14th (2005)	Minor Performance	Javier Vázquez (Los verdes campos del Edén)	Arantxa Aranguren (Yo, Claudio)	
16th (2007)	Leading Performance	Carlos Hipólito (El método Grönholm)	Cristina Marcos (El método Grönholm)	
16th (2007)	Secondary Performance	Jorge Calvo (Así es (si así os parece))	Mélida Molina (Así es (si así os parece))	
16th (2007)	Minor Performance	Eleazar Ortiz (El método Grönholm)	Arantxa Aranguren (Así es (si así os parece))	
17th (2008)	Leading Performance	José María Pou (La cabra)	Vicky Peña (Homebody Kabul)	
17th (2008)	Minor Performance	Rafa Castejón (Los persas)	Alicia Hermida (Fedra)	
17th (2008)	Minor Performance	Alfonso Blanco (Marat Sade)	Mónica Cano (The House of Bernarda Alba)	
18th (2009)	Leading Performance	Joan Crosas (Sweeney Todd)	Carmen Machi (La tortuga de Darwin)	
18th (2009)	Secondary Performance	Julián Villagrán (La taberna fantástica)	Malena Alterio (Uncle Vanya)	
18th (2009)	Minor Performance	Miguel Zúñiga (La taberna fantástica)	Karmele Aranburu (Las cuñadas)	
19th (2010)	Leading Performance	Nicolás Dueñas (Toc toc)	Rosa María Sardá (The House of Bernarda Alba)	
19th (2010)	Secondary Performance	Rafa Castejón (Don Carlos)	Nathalie Poza (Titus Andronicus)	
19th (2010)	Minor Performance	Carlos Álvarez-Nóvoa (Blood Wedding)	Lucía Bravo (La cena de los generales)	
20th (2011)	Leading Performance	Carlos Hipólito (Todos eran mis hijos)	Gloria Muñoz (Todos eran mis hijos)	
20th (2011)	Secondary Performance	Ginés García Millán (Glengary Glen Ross)	María Morales (Urtain)	
20th (2011)	Minor Performance	Raúl Prieto (La función por hacer)	Manuela Paso (La función por hacer)	
21st (2012)	Leading Performance	Asier Etxeandia (La avería)	Asunción Balaguer (El pisito)	
21st (2012)	Secondary Performance	Daniel Grao (La avería)	Elisabet Gelabert (Veraneantes)	
21st (2012)	Minor Performance	Chema Muñoz (Veraneantes)	María Isasi (Incrementum)	
22nd (2013)	Leading Performance	Carlos Hipólito (Follies)	Blanca Portillo (Life Is a Dream)	
22nd (2013)	Secondary Performance	Alberto Berzal (Los últimos días de Judas Iscariote) & Germán Torres (Ivan-Off)	Malena Alterio (Los hijos se han dormido)	
22nd (2013)	Minor Performance	Alberto Iglesias (De ratones y hombres)	Asunción Balaguer (Follies)	
23rd (2014)	Leading Performance	Asier Etxeandia (El intérprete)	Kiti Mánver (Las heridas del viento)	
23rd (2014)	Secondary Performance	Felipe Andrés (El fantástico Francis Hardy, curandero)	Inma Cuevas (Cerda)	
23rd (2014)	Minor Performance	Luis Callejo (Los miércoles no existen)	Nuria Gallardo (La verdad sospechosa)	
24th (2015)	Leading Performance	Miguel Rellán (Novecento. La leyenda del pianista del océano)	Inma Cuevas (Constelaciones)	
24th (2015)	Secondary Performance	Jorge Muriel (Cuando deje de llover)	Consuelo Trujillo (Cuando deje de llover)	
24th (2015)	Minor Performance	Felipe García Vélez (Cuando deje de llover)	Susi Sánchez (Cuando deje de llover)	
25th (2016)	Leading Performance	Daniel Grao (La piedra oscura)	Bárbara Lennie (La clausura del amor)	
25th (2016)	Secondary Performance	Víctor Clavijo (Fausto)	Ana Villa (El discurso del rey)	
25th (2016)	Minor Performance	Chema Ruiz (Los hermanos Karámazov)	Pilar Gómez (Cuando deje de llover)	
26th (2017)	Leading Performance	Ángel Ruiz (Miguel de Molina, al desnudo)	Consuelo Trujillo (Criatura)	
26th (2017)	Secondary Performance	José Troncoso (Historias de Usera)	Inma Cuevas (Historias de Usera)	
26th (2017)	Minor Performance	Rubén Frías (Danzad malditos)	Estefanía de los Santos (La distancia)	
27th (2018)	Leading Performance	Jorge Usón (Arte)	María Hervás (Iphigenia en Vallecas)	
27th (2018)	Secondary Performance	Manolo Solo (Smooking Room)	María Isasi (La Orestíada)	
27th (2018)	Minor Performance	Manuel Morón (Smooking Room)	Lucía Barrado (Incendios)	
28th (2019)	Leading Performance	Juan Codina (Luces de bohemia)	Laura Toledo (La voz dormida)	
28th (2019)	Secondary Performance	Pepe Viyuela (El burlador de Sevilla)	Natalia Hernández (La ternura)	
28th (2019)	Minor Performance	Juan Vinuesa (Algún día todo esto será tuyo)	Ángeles Martín (Hablar por hablar)	
29th (2020)	Leading Performance	Nacho Guerreros (Juguetes rotos)	Verónica Forqué (Las cosas que sé que son verdad)	
29th (2020)	Secondary Performance	Víctor Clavijo (Lehman trilogy)	Pilar Gómez (Las cosas que sé que son verdad)	
29th (2020)	Minor Performance	Fran Cantos (Jauría)	Consuelo Trujillo (La geometría del trigo)	

== Newcomer ==
Edition	Actor (work)	Actress (work)	Ref.
13th (2004)	Asier Etxeandía (Cabaret)	Nathalie Poza (Football Days)	
14th (2005)	Tamar Novas (The Sea Inside)	Belén Rueda (The Sea Inside)	
15th (2006)	Pablo Echarri (The Method)	Micaela Nevárez (Princesses)	
16th (2007)	Raúl Arévalo (Dark Blue Almost Black)	Ivana Baquero (Pan's Labyrinth)	
17th (2008)	Carlos Bardem (La zona)	Sonia Almarcha (Solitary Fragments)	
18th (2009)	Roberto Álamo (Urtain)	Violeta Pérez (My Prison Yard)	
19th (2010)	Alberto Ammann (Cell 211)	Leticia Herrero (Gordos)	
20th (2011)	Manuel Camacho (Entrelobos)	Bárbara Lennie (La función por hacer)	
21st (2012)	Jan Cornet (The Skin I Live In)	Rebeca Valls (Burundanga)	
22nd (2013)	Álex García (Entre esquelas)	Elena Rayos (Farsas y églogas)	
23rd (2014)	Hovik Keuchkerian (Scorpion in Love)	Olimpia Melinte (Cannibal)	
24th (2015)	Héctor Melgares (Caligula)	Pilar Gil (El zoo de cristal)	
25th (2016)	Nacho Sánchez (La piedra oscura)	Berta Vázquez (Palm Trees in the Snow)	
26th (2017)	Font García (The Fury of a Patient Man)	Ruth Díaz (The Fury of a Patient Man)	
27th (2018)	Eneko Sagardoy (Giant)	Itziar Castro (Skins)	
28th (2019)	Álex Villazán (El curioso incidente del perro a medianoche)	Eva Llorach (Who Will Sing to You)	
29th (2020)	Kike Guaza (Juguetes rotos)	Irene Arcos (El embarcadero)	

== Performance in an International Production ==
Edition	Actor (work)	Actress (work)	Ref.
28th (2019)	Alberto Ammann (Narcos)	Penélope Cruz (American Crime Story: Versace)	
29th (2020)	Óscar Jaenada (Hernán)	Ana de Armas (Knives Out)	
