= 18th Actors and Actresses Union Awards =

2009 award ceremony for acting achievements

- Date: 9 March 2009
- Site: Teatro Circo Price, Madrid, Spain
- Organized by: Actors and Actresses Union

Highlights
- Honorary career award: María Asquerino

The 18th Actors and Actresses Union Awards ceremony was held on 9 March 2009 at the Teatro Circo Price in Madrid.

The cast of Camino swept most of the film awards. In addition to the competitive awards, the Teatro Yeses (and its founder Elena Cánovas) received the 'Mujeres en Unión' award, María Asquerino the 'Toda una vida' career award and the Special Award went to TVE's film show Versión española. The gala was directed by actress and dancer Eva del Palacio.

== Winners and nominees ==
The winners and nominees are listed as follows:

=== Film ===
Best Male Performance in a Leading Role: Mariano Venancio — Camino; Raúl Arévalo — The Blind Sunflowers; Víctor Clavijo — Before the Fall; Juan Luis Galiardo — Esperpentos	Best Female Performance in a Leading Role: Carme Elías — Camino; Carmen Maura — Que parezca un accidente; Maribel Verdú — The Blind Sunflowers
Best Male Performance in a Secondary Role: Jordi Dauder — Camino; Eduard Fernández — Before the Fall; Eduardo Noriega — Transsiberian	Best Female Performance in a Secondary Role: Ana Wagener — My Prison Yard; Penélope Cruz — Vicky Cristina Barcelona; Chus Lampreave — Chef's Special
Best Male Performance in a Minor Role: José Ángel Egido — The Blind Sunflowers; Pepe Ocio — Camino; Luis Varela — Chef's Special	Best Female Performance in a Minor Role: Lola Casamayor — Camino; Ana Gracia — Camino; Natalia Mateo — My Prison Yard

=== Television ===
Best Male Performance in a Leading Role: Pepe Viyuela — Aída; Roberto Enríquez — La señora; Luis Merlo — El internado	Best Female Performance in a Leading Role: Concha Velasco — Herederos; Ana Duato — Cuéntame; Nathalie Poza — LEX
Best Male Performance in a Secondary Role: Félix Gómez — Herederos; Ángel Pardo — Amar en tiempos revueltos; Nancho Novo — El síndrome de Ulises	Best Female Performance in a Secondary Role: Ana Labordeta — Amar en tiempos revueltos; Marina San José — Amar en tiempos revueltos; Ana Wagener — La señora
Best Male Performance in a Minor Role: Luis Varela — Cámera Café; Juan Díaz — Sin tetas no hay paraíso; Carlos Santos — Los hombres de Paco	Best Female Performance in a Minor Role: Berta Ojea — La señora; Saturna Barrio — Amar en tiempos revueltos; Marisol Rolandi — Hospital Central

=== Theatre ===
Best Male Performance in a Leading Role: Joan Crosas — Sweeney Todd; Adolfo Fernández — Cantando bajo las balas; Rafael Núñez — Los cuernos de don Friolera	Best Female Performance in a Leading Role: Carmen Machi — La tortuga de Darwin; Nuria Espert — Hay que purgar a Totó; Nuria Gallardo — Sonata de otoño
Best Male Performance in a Secondary Role: Julián Villagrán — La taberna fantástica; Ángel Pardo — Mentiras, incienso y mirra; César Sánchez — Carnaval	Best Female Performance in a Secondary Role: Malena Alterio — Uncle Vanya; Trinidad Iglesias — Las cuñadas; Violeta Pérez — Carnaval
Best Male Performance in a Minor Role: Miguel Zúñiga — La taberna fantástica; Manuel Millán — Hay que purgar a Totó; Diego Pizarro — Los cuernos de don Friolera	Best Female Performance in a Minor Role: Karmele Aranburu — Las cuñadas; Pilar Gil — Sonata de otoño; Gracia Olayo — Silencio vivimos

=== Newcomers ===
Best New Actor: Roberto Álamo — Urtain; Miguel Ángel Silvestre — Sin tetas no hay paraíso; Ben Temple — Cazadores de hombres	Best New Actress: Violeta Pérez — My Prison Yard; Macarena Gómez — Sexykiller; Esperanza Pedreño — One Word from You
