= List of Spanish films of 2008 =

A list of Spanish-produced and co-produced feature films released in Spain in 2008. When applicable, the domestic theatrical release date is favoured.

== Films ==
Release		Title (Domestic title)	Cast & Crew	Ref.
J A N U A R Y	11	The Field of Stars (El prado de las estrellas)	Director: Mario Camus Cast: Álvaro de Luna, Marián Aguilera, José Manuel Cervino, Antonio de la Torre, Rodolfo Sancho	
J A N U A R Y	11	XXY	Director: Lucía Puenzo Cast: Inés Efron, Ricardo Darín, Germán Palacios, Valeria Bertuccelli	
J A N U A R Y	18	The Oxford Murders (Los crímenes de Oxford)	Director: Álex de la Iglesia Cast: Elijah Wood, John Hurt, Leonor Watling, Dominique Pinon	
J A N U A R Y	25	Savage Grace	Director: Tom Kalin Cast: Julianne Moore, Eddie Redmayne, Stephen Dillane, Elena Anaya, Unax Ugalde, Belén Rueda, Hugh Dancy	
F E B R U A R Y	8	Asterix at the Olympic Games (Astérix en los Juegos Olímpicos)	Director: Frédéric Forestier, Thomas Langmann Cast: Gerard Depardieu, Clovis Cornillac, Alain Delon, Vanessa Hessler	(Note: Co-production Spain–Germany–France–Italy (10%–20%–60%–10%).)
M A R C H	7	The Best of Me (Lo mejor de mí)	Director: Roser Aguilar Cast: Marian Álvarez, Juan Sanz, Lluís Homar, Alberto Jiménez, Marieta Orozco, Carmen Machi, Pablo Derqui	
M A R C H	14	Pradolongo	Director: Ignacio Vilar	
M A R C H	14	The Lesser Evil (El menor de los males)	Director: Antonio Hernández Cast: Carmen Maura, Roberto Álvarez, Verónica Echegui	
A P R I L	11	Chef's Special (Fuera de carta)	Director: Nacho G. Velilla Cast: Javier Cámara, Lola Dueñas, Fernando Tejero, Benjamín Vicuña, Luis Varela, Chus Lampreave, Cristina Marcos, Alexandra Jiménez, Junio Valverde	
A P R I L	11	Crazy (Enloquecidas)	Director: Juan Luis Iborra Cast: Verónica Forqué, Silvia Abascal, Concha Velasco, Asunción Balaguer, Iván Sánchez, Juli Mira, Elisa Matilla, Jesús Cabrero, Juana Cordero, Javier Blanes, Merche Suance, Jordi Rebellón	
A P R I L	11	Todos estamos invitados	Director: Manuel Gutiérrez Aragón Cast: Óscar Jaenada, José Coronado, Vanessa Incontrada, Iñaki Miramón, Adolfo Fernández, Kike Díaz de Rada, Leire Ucha, Iñaki Font, Paul Zubillaga, Iñake Irastorza	
A P R I L	18	8 Dates (8 citas)	Director: Peris Romano, Rodrigo Sorogoyen Cast: Raúl Arévalo, Verónica Echegui, José Luis García Pérez, Adriana Ozores, Belén Rueda, Miguel Ángel Solá, Fernando Tejero, Jordi Vilches, Arturo Valls, Ana Wagener	
A P R I L	25	Before the Fall (3 días)	Director: Francisco Javier Gutiérrez Cast: Víctor Clavijo, Mariana Cordero, Eduard Fernández	
A P R I L	25	Proyecto Dos	Director: Guillermo Groizard Cast: Adrià Collado, Lucía Jiménez, Andrew Bicknell	
A P R I L	25	Cowards (Cobardes)	Director: José Corbacho, Juan Cruz Cast: Lluís Homar, Elvira Mínguez, Paz Padilla	
M A Y	9	Casual Day	Director: Max Lemcke Cast: Juan Diego, Luis Tosar, Javier Ríos, Estíbaliz Gabilondo, Alberto San Juan, Arturo Valls, Álex Angulo, Carlos Kaniowsky, Secun de la Rosa, Mikel Losada, Malena Alterio	
M A Y	23	Wrap Up (Abrígate)	Director: Ramón Costafreda Cast: Manuela Pal, Félix Gómez, Celso Bugallo, María Bouzas	
J U N E	27	Rivals (Rivales)	Director: Fernando Colomo Cast: Ernesto Alterio, Goya Toledo, Kira Miró, Jorge Sanz, Rosa María Sardá	
J U L Y	18	Shiver (Eskalofrío)	Director: Isidro Ortiz Cast: Junio Valverde, Blanca Suárez, Jimmy Barnatán	
A U G U S T	22	One Word from You (Una palabra tuya)	Director: Ángeles González Sinde Cast: Malena Alterio, Esperanza Pedreño, Antonio de la Torre	
A U G U S T	29	The Blind Sunflowers (Los girasoles ciegos)	Director: José Luis Cuerda Cast: Maribel Verdú, Javier Cámara, Raúl Arévalo	
S E P T E M B E R	5	La conjura de El Escorial	Director: Antonio del Real Cast: Jason Isaacs, Julia Ormond, Juanjo Puigcorbé, Jordi Mollá	
S E P T E M B E R	5	The Argentine (Che. El argentino)	Director: Steven Soderbergh Cast: Benicio del Toro, Demián Bichir, Santiago Cabrera, Jorge Perugorría, Édgar Ramírez, Armando Riesco, Catalina Sandino Moreno, Rodrigo Santoro, Unax Ugalde, Yul Vazquez	(Note: Co-production Spain–United States (25%–75%).)
S E P T E M B E R	12	King of the Hill (El rey de la montaña)	Director: Gonzalo López-Gallego Cast: Leonardo Sbaraglia, María Valverde, Pablo Menasanch, Francisco Olmo, Manuel Sánchez Ramos	
S E P T E M B E R	12	Spirit of the forest (Espíritu del bosque)	Director: David Rubín, Juan Carlos Pena	
S E P T E M B E R	19	Vicky Cristina Barcelona	Director: Woody Allen Cast: Javier Bardem, Patricia Clarkson, Penélope Cruz, Kevin Dunn, Rebecca Hall, Scarlett Johansson, Chris Messina	
S E P T E M B E R	26	My Prison Yard (El patio de mi cárcel)	Director: Belén Macías Cast: Candela Peña, Verónica Echegui, Ana Wagener, Violeta Pérez, Natalia Mateo, Maria Pau Pigem, Tatiana Astengo, Ledicia Sola, Blanca Apilánez, Susi Sánchez, Blanca Portillo, Patricia Reyes Spíndola	
O C T O B E R	3	Blood in May (Sangre de mayo)	Director: José Luis Garci Cast: Quim Gutiérrez, Paula Echevarría	
O C T O B E R	10	Santos	Director: Nicolás López Cast: Javier Gutiérrez, Elsa Pataky, Leonardo Sbaraglia, Guillermo Toledo	
O C T O B E R	17	Camino	Director: Javier Fesser Cast: Nerea Camacho, Carme Elias, Mariano Venancio, Manuela Vellés	
O C T O B E R	17	Diary of a Nymphomaniac (Diario de una ninfómana)	Director: Christian Molina Cast: David Vert, Jemi Paretas, Ferrán Lahoz, Jaume García Arija	
O C T O B E R	17	RH+, el vampiro de Sevilla	Director: Antonio Zurera	
O C T O B E R	24	Rated R (Los años desnudos. Clasificada S)	Director: Dunia Ayaso, Félix Sabroso Cast: Candela Peña, Goya Toledo, Mar Flores	
O C T O B E R	24	La vida en rojo	Director: Andrés Linares Cast: José Luis Gómez, Ingrid Rubio, Sergio Peris-Mencheta, Pilar Bardem, Miguel Ángel Solá	
O C T O B E R	24	Empty Nest (El nido vacío)	Director: Daniel Burman Cast: Oscar Martínez, Cecilia Roth	
O C T O B E R	31	Just Walking (Solo quiero caminar)	Director: Agustín Díaz Yanes Cast: Diego Luna, Victoria Abril, Ariadna Gil, Pilar López de Ayala, Elena Anaya, José María Yazpik	
N O V E M B E R	7	Cenizas del cielo	Director: José Antonio Quirós Cast: Celso Bugallo, Clara Segura, Gary Piquer, Fran Sariego, Beatriz Rico, Txema Blasco	
N O V E M B E R	14	The Good News (La buena nueva)	Director: Helena Taberna Cast: Unax Ugalde, Bárbara Goenaga, Guillermo Toledo	
D E C E M B E R	12	The Appeared (Aparecidos)	Director: Paco Cabezas Cast: Ruth Díaz, Javier Pereira	(Note: Co-production Spain–Argentina (80%–20%).)
D E C E M B E R	12	Pérez, el ratoncito de tus sueños 2	Director: Andrés Schaer	(Note: Co-production Spain–Argentina (50%–50%).)
D E C E M B E R	25	Missing Lynx (El lince perdido)	Director: Raúl García, Manuel Sicilia	
D E C E M B E R	25	Prime Time	Director: Luis Calvo Ramos Cast: Leticia Dolera, Alberto Amarilla, Pablo Puyol, Ana Álvarez	

== Box office ==
The ten highest-grossing Spanish films in 2008, by domestic box office gross revenue, are as follows:

Highest-grossing films of 2008
Rank	Title	Distributor	Admissions	Domestic gross (€)
1	The Oxford Murders (Los crímenes de Oxford)	Warner Bros.	1,421,063	8,201,220.76
2	Mortadelo and Filemon. Mission: Save the Planet (Mortadelo y Filemón. Misión: Salvar la Tierra)	Zeta Audiovisual	1,363,275	7,706,810.77
3	Vicky Cristina Barcelona	Warner Bros.	1,240,343	7,459,286.88
4	Che (Che. El argentino)	Hispano Foxfilm	1,161,635	6,830,886.78
5	Asterix at the Olympic Games (Astérix en los Juegos Olímpicos)	Tripictures	1,051,286	5,905,546.01
6	Chef's Special (Fuera de carta)	Warner Bros.	898,186	5,107,626.42
7	The Blind Sunflowers (Los girasoles ciegos)	Alta Classics	710,318	4,073,176.61
8	Transsiberian	Sociedad General de Cine	393,453	2,348,860.83
9	The El Escorial Conspiracy (La conjura de El Escorial)	Sony	318,580	1,845,819.84
10	Carlitos and the Field of Dreams (Carlitos y el campo de los sueños)	Hispano Foxfilm	258,345	1,401,541.26

== See also ==
- 23rd Goya Awards
