= 23rd Goya Awards =

- Date: 1 February 2009
- Site: Palacio Municipal de Congresos de Madrid
- Hosted by: Carmen Machi

Highlights
- Best Film: Camino
- Best Actor: Benicio del Toro; Che (Part I): The Argentine
- Best Actress: Carme Elías; Camino
- Most awards: Camino (6)
- Most nominations: The Blind Sunflowers (15)

Television coverage
- Network: TVE

The 23rd Goya Awards honouring the best in Spanish filmmaking of 2008 were presented on 1 February 2009 at the Madrid's Palacio Municipal de Congresos. The gala was hosted by Carmen Machi, also featuring Muchachada Nui.

Camino was the big winner of the night, winning 6 awards out 7 nominations, including Best Film, Actress, Director and Original Screenplay.

== Winners and nominees ==
The winners and nominees are listed as follows:

=== Major awards ===
Best Film: Camino; The Blind Sunflowers; Just Walking; The Oxford Murders	Best Director: Javier Fesser – Camino; Agustín Díaz Yanes – Just Walking; José Luis Cuerda – The Blind Sunflowers; Álex de la Iglesia – The Oxford Murders
Best Actor: Benicio del Toro – Che (Part I): The Argentine; Diego Luna – Just Walking; Raúl Arévalo – The Blind Sunflowers; Javier Cámara – Chef's Special	Best Actress: Carme Elías – Camino; Maribel Verdú – The Blind Sunflowers; Verónica Echegui – My Prison Yard; Ariadna Gil – Just Walking
Best Supporting Actor: Jordi Dauder – Camino; Fernando Tejero – Chef's Special; José Ángel Egido – The Blind Sunflowers; José María Yazpik – Just Walking	Best Supporting Actress: Penélope Cruz – Vicky Cristina Barcelona; Elvira Mínguez – Cowards; Rosana Pastor – The El Escorial Conspiracy; Tina Sáinz – Blood in May
Best Original Screenplay: Javier Fesser – Camino; Chus Gutiérrez, Juan Carlos Rubio – Return to Hansala; Ignacio del Moral, Dionisio Pérez Galindo, José Antonio Quirós – Ashes of Heaven; Agustín Díaz Yanes – Just Walking	Best Adapted Screenplay: Rafael Azcona, Jose Luis Cuerda – The Blind Sunflowers; Peter Buchman – Che (Part I): The Argentine; Jorge Guerricaechevarría, Álex de la Iglesia – The Oxford Murders; Ángeles González Sinde – One Word from You
Best New Actor: El Langui – The One-Handed Trick; Martiño Rivas – The Blind Sunflowers; Luis Bermejo – One Word from You; Álvaro Cervantes – The Hanged Man	Best New Actress: Nerea Camacho – Camino; Esperanza Pedreño – One Word from You; Farah Hamed – Return to Hansala; Ana Wagener – My Prison Yard
Best Spanish Language Foreign Film: The Good Life • Chile/Spain/Argentina; Acné • Uruguay/Spain/Argentina; Dog Eat Dog • Colombia; Lake Tahoe • Mexico/United States/Japan	Best European Film: 4 Months, 3 Weeks and 2 Days • Romania; The Boy in the Striped Pyjamas (film) • UK; The Dark Knight • UK; The Edge of Heaven • Germany
Best New Director: Santiago A. Zannou – The One-Handed Trick; Irene Cardona – A Fiancé for Yasmina; Belén Macías – My Prison Yard; Nacho Vigalondo – Timecrimes	Best Animated Film: Missing Lynx; RH+, el vampiro de Sevilla; Donkey Xote; Spirit of the Forest
Best Cinematography: Paco Femenia – Just Walking; Carlos Suárez – The El Escorial Conspiracy; Hans Burmann – The Blind Sunflowers; Félix Monti – Blood in May	Best Editing: Alejandro Lázaro – The Oxford Murders; Iván Aledo – Mortadelo and Filemon. Mission: Save the Planet; Nacho Ruiz Capillas – The Blind Sunflowers; José Salcedo – Just Walking
Best Art Direction: Antxón Gómez – Che (Part I): The Argentine; Balter Gallart – The Blind Sunflowers; Gil Parrondo – Blood in May; Luis Vallés "Koldo" – La Conjura de El Escorial	Best Production Supervision: Rosa Romero – The Oxford Murders; Cristina Zumárraga – Che (Part I): The Argentine; Emiliano Otegui – The Blind Sunflowers; Rafael Cuervo, María Pedraza – Just Walking
Best Sound: Jorge Marín, Maite Rivera, Daniel de Zayas – Before the Fall; Ricardo Steinberg, María Steinberg, Alfonso Raposo – The Blind Sunflowers; Miguel Rejas, José Antonio Bermúdez – Blood in May; Pierre Gamet, Christophe Vingtrinier, Patrice Grisolet – Just Walking	Best Special Effects: Alex Grau, Chema Remacha, Eduardo Díaz, Pau Costa, Raúl Romanillos, Jose Quetglás – Mortadelo and Filemon. Mission: Save the Planet; Arturo Balseiro, Ferrán Piquer, Raúl Romanillos – Camino; Alberto Nombela, Juan Ramón Molina – Blood in May; Alejandro Vázquez, Rafa Solórzano, Reyes Abades –Just Walking
Best Costume Design: Lala Huete– El Greco; Sonia Grande – The Blind Sunflowers; Javier Artiñano – The El Escorial Conspiracy; Lourdes de Orduña – Blood in May	Best Makeup and Hairstyles: Jose Quetglás, Mar Paradela, Nieves Sánchez – Mortadelo and Filemon. Mission: Save the Planet; Jose Quetglás, Nieves Sánchez – La Conjura de El Escorial; Fermín Galán, Sylvie Imbert – The Blind Sunflowers; Alicia López, Josefa Morales, Romana González – Blood in May
Best Original Score: Roque Baños – The Oxford Murders; Bingen Mendizábal – The Hanged Man; Lucio Godoy – The Blind Sunflowers; Alberto Iglesias – Che (Part I): The Argentine	Best Original Song: "A tientas" by Woulfrank Zannou, El Langui – The One-Handed Trick; "Podemos volar juntos" by Raul Sánchez Zafra, Juan Pablo Compaired – My Prison Yard; "Manousal" by Tao Gutiérrez – Retorno a Hansala; "Entre tu balcón y mi Ventana" by Toni Zenet, Javier Laguna, José Taboada – One Word from You
Best Fictional Short Film: Miente; El Encargado; Final; Machu-Pichu; Porque Hay Cosas Que Nunca Se Olvidan	Best Animated Short Film: La increíble historia del hombre sin sombra; El ataque de los kriters asesinos; Espagueti Western; Malacara y el misterio del bastón de roble; Rascal's Street
Best Documentary Film: Bucarest, la memoria perdida; El pollo, el pez y el cangrejo real; El último truco. Emilio Ruiz del Río; Old Man Bebo	Best Documentary Short Film: Héroes. No hacen falta alas para volar; Harraga; La clase; Soy Meera Malik

== Honorary Goya ==
- Jesús Franco
