= Alexia González-Barros González =

Spanish child and cancer victim venerated in the Catholic Church

Venerable Alexia González-Barros González

Child
- Born: 7 March 1971; Madrid, Spain
- Died: 5 December 1980 (aged 9); Universidad de Navarra clinic, Pamplona, Navarra, Spain
- Venerated in: Roman Catholic Church
- Feast: 5 December

Alexia González-Barros González (7 March 1971 – 5 December 1985) was a Spanish Catholic child who died of cancer in 1985.

González-Barros studied in school in Madrid and in her childhood received a papal blessing from Pope John Paul II during her trip to Rome. But in late 1984 she began feeling pains in her arm and back that led to a diagnosis two months later as being a malignant tumor in the vertebral column transforming into spinal cancer. Her siblings and friends remembered her for her piousness and her dedication to practicing holiness in all aspects of life.

In 2008 a controversial film was released depicting her life and death; the director maintains that it was a fictional tale that did not depict González-Barros even though it was dedicated to her and drew on some aspects of her life. Her siblings and Opus Dei railed against the film for its perceived slander and inaccuracies that were "unjust".

Her beatification process launched in 1991 and she became titled as a Servant of God. Pope Francis later declared her to be Venerable in July 5, 2018 after confirming that the child had lived a life of heroic virtue to a favorable degree.

== Life ==
Alexia González-Barros González was born in Madrid on 7 March 1971 as the last of seven children born to the Opus Dei supernumeraries Francisco (d. 30.12.2001) and Moncha (d. 3.2.2006); two of those children died as infants. Francisco and Alfredo were two of her older brothers.

On 15 October 1975 she began her schooling in Madrid while her mother would instruct her in catechism. González-Barros made her First Communion in Rome in the Santa Maria della Pace church (where the Opus Dei founder Josemaría Escrivá is buried) on 8 May 1979 and on the following morning attended a papal general audience in Saint Peter's Square. Pope John Paul II was passing to extend his greetings to the pilgrims and she ran up to him from the crowd to hug him; the pope blessed her and kissed her forehead.

In December 1984 she felt a dull pain in her right shoulder that doctors defined as being muscular contractions. But two months later she noticed her left arm felt weak and she was suffering from back pains which prompted a return to doctors for assessment. The doctors diagnosed González-Barros on 4 February 1985 as having a malignant spinal tumor in the vertebral column which led to four operations to manage her condition that evolved into spinal cancer. The doctors discovered the lesion of the spinal column was due to Ewing's sarcoma with widespread metastases.

Her first operation was held on 9 February and the second on 28 March both in Madrid. But she was taken to a hospital in Pamplona where she was operated on 27 June and 8 September (two of these operations saw doctors operate to remove bone from her hip for grafts). González-Barros made her last confession on 30 November at which point she received her Confirmation and the Anointing of the Sick. Her disease progressed at a rapid pace to the point where she could not move out of confinement in bed. Her battle against spinal cancer lasted around ten months and led to her death in the morning on 5 December 1985 in the Universidad de Navarra clinic in Pamplona; her remains were transported to Madrid on 6 December for burial. Her friend and classmate Begoña Hernandez said that at her death she had the firm conviction that her friend had been a saint. Nine biographies about her have been published since her death.

== Film controversies ==
In 2008 the film Camino was presented in the San Sebastián Film Festival (where it received a tepid reception) before it was released in theatres in mid-October. Both the González-Barros siblings and Opus Dei officials expressed their outrage over the film, seeing that the director Javier Fesser showed Opus Dei lauding Alexia's death. The film put her in the middle of the group grooming her for a death that turned her into both a potential saint and propaganda tool.

Her siblings were outraged that the director dedicated the film to her (without having ever consulted them in the film's production) as having inspired the protagonist called Camino. Fesser asserted that his film did not intend to have the protagonist be Alexia and referred to his film as being "pure fiction" rather than based on an actual tale. But Alexia's brother Alfredo said in a letter that Fesser's film "is both unjust and terrible" and that it reopened old wounds for him and his siblings. The film also depicted her beatification cause as having been initiated for fraudulent reasons given Camino's death, which prompted outrage from Opus Dei who said Alexia's beatification cause was the result of her holiness.

In 2011 a documentary film about Alexia was directed by Pedro Delgado.

== Beatification process ==
The beatification process took its first step towards launch on 21 November 1991 after Benito Badrinas Amat was appointed as the cause's postulator (official in charge of the cause). The official request to launch the beatification process was made on 16 July 1992 to the Cardinal Archbishop of Madrid Angel Suquía Goicoechea who then lodged the official request to officials in Rome. The next step was to transfer the forum for the cause from the Pamplona-Tudela archdiocese to the Madrid archdiocese on 11 January 1991. The Congregation for the Causes of Saints on 8 February 1993 issued the official edict nihil obstat (no objections to the cause) which launched the cause and titled González-Barros as a Servant of God. Bishop Luis Gutíerrez Martín inaugurated the diocesan process on 14 April 1993 while the cardinal archbishop closed the process later on 1 June 1994. The cause accumulated 4600 pages in eleven volumes of documentation which was sent to the C.C.S. officials in Rome; the C.C.S. validated the diocesan process on 11 November 1994 as having complied with the rules regarding the conduct of causes. Flavio Capucci was appointed as the second postulator on 27 June 1994 to oversee the Roman Phase of the process (the investigation held in Rome).

The postulation compiled and submitted the official Positio dossier to the C.C.S. on 8 May 2000 for additional assessment. Nine theologians met (in a meeting that Carmelo Pellegrini chaired) and approved the cause after having assessed the dossier on 10 December 2017 as did the C.C.S. cardinal and bishop members later on 3 July 2018. Pope Francis titled González-Barros as Venerable on 5 July 2018 after acknowledging that the child had demonstrated heroic virtue during her lifetime to an adequate degree.

== See also ==
- Opus Dei
- Camino
- Chiara Badano
- Carlo Acutis
- Antonietta Meo
- Laura Vicuña
