= F. Javier Gutiérrez =

Spanish filmmaker

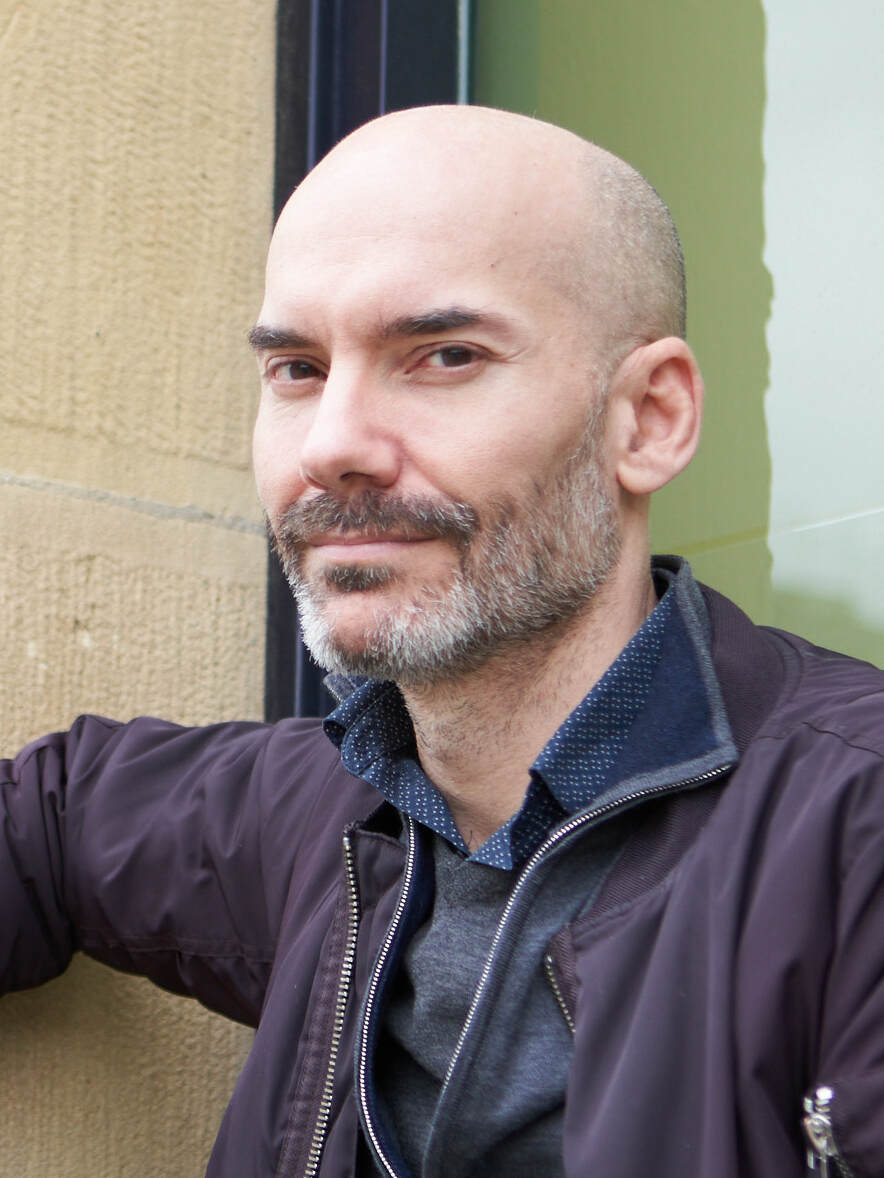
- Gutiérrez in 2023
- Born: July 5, 1973 (age 52); Córdoba, Spain
- Years active: 1996–present

Francisco Javier Gutiérrez Díaz is a Spanish film director, producer and writer. Two-Time European Golden Melies nominee, he is well known for his works like the short films Brazil and Norman's Room, and his feature film debut Before the Fall.

== Early life ==
Gutiérrez was born in Córdoba, Spain. While attending Law School, he also studied acting and produced his first short films. In 2001, he founded his own film production company. With Brasil (Best Short Film in Sitges International Film Festival and Nominated for the European Golden Melies), he entered his first international festivals where he was quickly identified as a director with a distinct personal style.

== Career ==
In 2001, Gutiérrez created his own production company aiming to make films with an international reach. In 2002, he was invited by TVE program "Versión Española" to direct a piece for the series Diminutos del Calvario II. News of Gutiérrez's La habitacion de Norman (Norman's Room), a claustrophobic tribute to Psycho, was published by film industry magazines in the United States. In the same year, he won the Universal Studios award and visited Los Angeles for the first time. In 2007, Gutiérrez received an offer from Antonio Banderas and Antonio Pérez to direct his first feature film, Before the Fall (2008) which entered the official section "Special Panorama" at the Berlin Film Festival.

Gutiérrez had been working on the reboot of the 90's cult movie The Crow based on James O'Barr's comic book and produced by Relativity Media and Edward R. Pressman. But in June 2014, Gutiérrez signed on to the direct the next installment of The Ring franchise, produced by Walter F. Parkes and Laurie MacDonald, for Paramount Pictures, that made him unavailable to helm The Crow. According to Deadline Hollywood, Gutierrez was set to stay on board The Crow as executive producer.

== Before the Fall ==
Before the Fall (aka 3 días) is Gutiérrez's first feature film. During its premiere at the Berlin Film Festival, the public booed and applauded equally. The controversy grew among the critics when Rebecca Davies from The Daily Telegraph praised the films as one of the best in the festival because

It proves that films about armageddic meteorites crashing into the Earth can be both intelligent and moving. Deep Impact it ain't.

Whereas Jay Weissberg from Variety attacked the film because of its violence, labeling it as unpleasant and inappropriate

College-age males may get a kick, but survival chances outside Spain are slim.

However, before its Spanish premiere at the Malaga Film Festival, the film had already been sold for distribution in several countries, including Japan, and two offers had been received for a remake in English (including one from Wes Craven).

In 2008, Before the Fall became a buzz in Europe. In Spain, the film won the main awards in the most prestigious Spanish film festival, the 2008 Malaga Film Festival (including Best Motion Picture and Best Screenplay), the Miradas Award (TVE) for the Best Motion Picture of the Year and several awards and nominations in the Actors Guild of Spain and the Spain Critics Awards. On the other hand, in Europe, the film was finalist for the 2008 European Film Awards and won the main prizes in some of the most prestigious Science-Fiction and Fantasy Film Festivals including the Silver Méliès for the Best European Film in Imagine (Amsterdam Fantastic Film Festival), the Asteroide Award at Trieste Science+Fiction Festival (Italy), and the ScreamFest Crystal Skull Award for the Best Director in Los Angeles.

In 2009, Before the Fall was included in third place in the 2008 Hollywood International Watch List.

== Rings ==
Gutiérrez directed the sequel Rings (2017), the third installment and direct sequel to The Ring (2002), of the U.S. Ring franchise. It was produced by Walter F. Parkes and Laurie MacDonald for Paramount Pictures. The film was released in the United States on February 3, 2017, opened #2 in the domestic box office, and grossed $83 million worldwide against its $25 million budget.

== The Wait ==
Gutiérrez’s film The Wait in which he wrote and directed is scheduled for a VOD release on October 4, 2024.

== Filmography ==
=== Shorts ===
Year	Title	Director	Writer	Producer	Editor	Production Designer
1996	WC Columna de aseo	Yes	Yes	Yes	No	Yes
1999	El cuerpo	Yes	Yes	Yes	Yes	Yes
2002	Brasil	Yes	Yes	Yes	Yes	Yes
2002	La habitación de Norman	Yes	Yes	No	No	No

=== Films ===
Year	Title	Director	Writer
2008	Before the Fall	Yes	Yes
2017	Rings	Yes	No
2023	The Wait (La espera)	Yes	Yes
TBA	Home School	Yes	No

Co-producer

- Demonic (2015)

Video assistant

- El palo (2001)
