= Just Walking =

2008 Spanish-Mexican film

- Theatrical release poster
- Spanish: Sólo quiero caminar
- Directed by: Agustín Díaz Yanes
- Written by: Agustín Díaz Yanes
- Produced by: José Manuel Lorenzo; Eduardo Campoy; Pablo Cruz
- Starring: Ariadna Gil; Diego Luna; Victoria Abril; Pilar López de Ayala; Elena Anaya; José Mª Yazpik
- Cinematography: Paco Femenía
- Edited by: José Salcedo
- Music by: Javier Limón
- Production company: Boomerang Cine
- Distributed by: Filmax (internationally)
- Release date: 31 October 2008
- Running time: 129 minutes
- Countries: Spain; Mexico
- Language: Spanish
- Box office: $2.3 million

Just Walking (Spanish: Sólo quiero caminar; transl. 'I Only Want to Walk'), also known as Walking Vengeance, is a 2008 Spanish-Mexican crime thriller film directed and written by Agustín Díaz Yanes. Its cast includes Ariadna Gil, Diego Luna, Victoria Abril, Pilar López de Ayala, Elena Anaya, and José María Yazpik.

The film was nominated for eleven Goya Awards, winning one (Best Cinematography).

== Plot ==
After a failed jewellery heist, Aurora Rodriguez (Ariadna Gil) is caught and sentenced to eight years in prison, while her three accomplices get away. Aurora's sister, prostitute Ana (Elena Anaya), meets a powerful Mexican drug lord Felix (José María Yazpik) during a job and agrees to marry him. While Paloma (Pilar López de Ayala) leverages her connections as a court secretary to influence a judge into reducing Aurora's sentence to four years, Gloria (Victoria Abril) joins Ana in Mexico and discovers that Felix has been brutally abusing Ana.

Just as Ana reveals to Gloria that she intends to get back at Felix by stealing all his money, Felix viciously beats Ana in a fit of rage. He leaves her barely alive and hospitalized. Paloma secures Aurora's release from prison and they join Gloria and Ana in Mexico, where the four women set Ana's plan in motion. Meanwhile, Felix's right-hand man Gabriel (Diego Luna) has spent twenty years waiting to take revenge on his father, currently in prison for beating Gabriel's mother to death. Though Gabriel begins developing suspicions towards what Aurora and her friends are planning, Felix's violent behavior causes him to question his unwavering loyalty to his childhood friend.

== Awards and nominations ==
=== Won ===
Cinema Writers Circle Awards

- Best Actress in a Leading Role (Ariadna Gil)

Goya Awards

- Best Cinematography (Paco Femenia)

=== Nominated ===
Cinema Writers Circle Awards

- Best Actor in a Leading Role (Diego Luna)
- Best Actor in a Supporting Role (José María Yazpik)
- Best Cinematography (Paco Femenia)
- Best Director (Agustín Díaz Yanes)
- Best Film
- Best Screenplay – Original (Agustín Díaz Yanes)

Goya Awards

- Best Actor in a Leading Role (Diego Luna)
- Best Actor in a Supporting Role (José María Yazpik)
- Best Actress in a Leading Role (Ariadna Gil)
- Best Director (Agustín Díaz Yanes)
- Best Film
- Best Editing (José Salcedo)
- Best Production Supervision (Rafael Cuervo and Mario Pedraza)
- Best Screenplay – Original (Agustín Díaz Yanes)
- Best Sound Pierre Gamet, Patrice Grisolet and Christophe Vingtrinier)
- Best Visual Effects (Reyes Abades, Rafa Solorzano and Alejandro Vázquez)

== See also ==
- List of Spanish films of 2008
