= Pilar Gómez =

Spanish actress

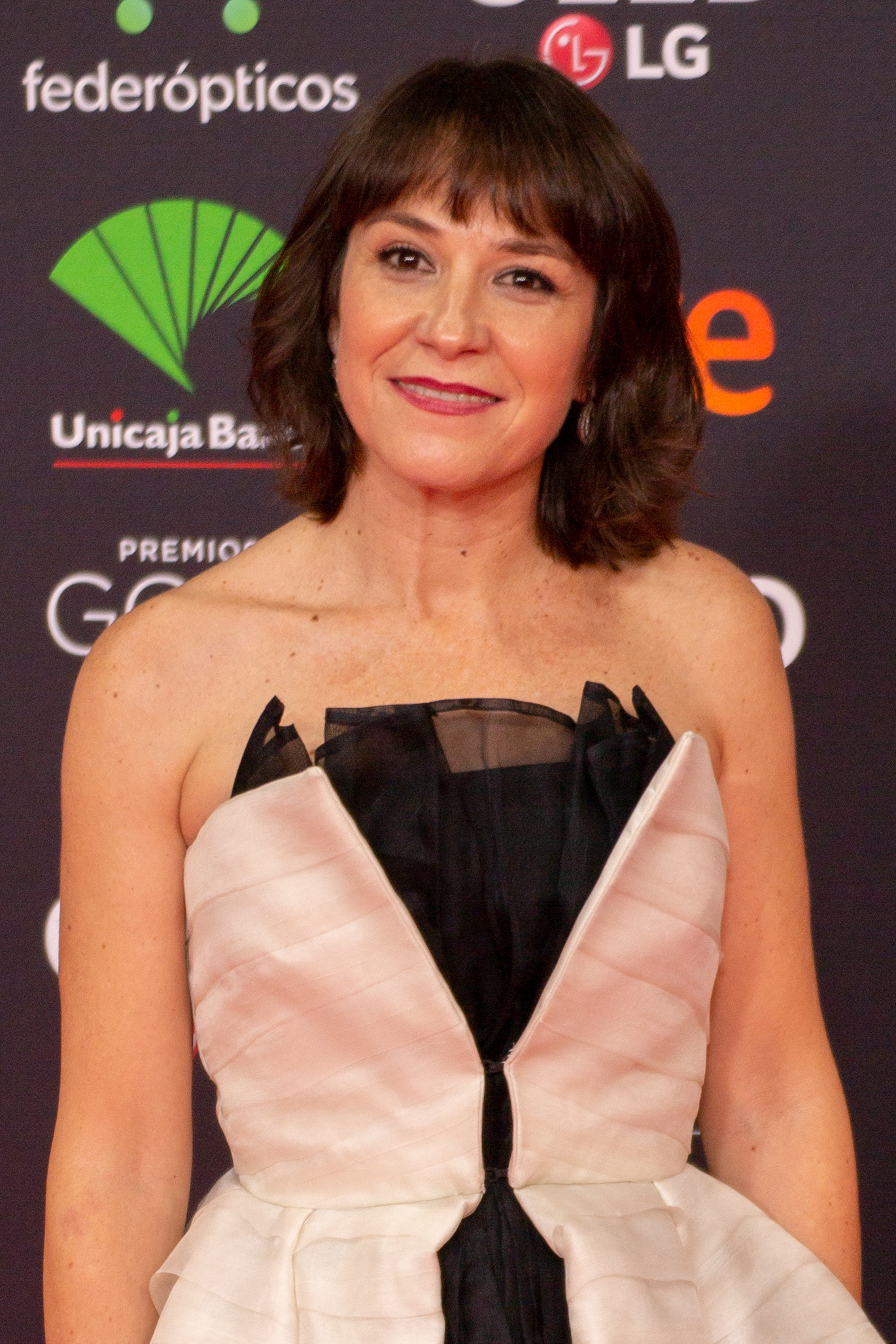
- Gómez attending the Goya Awards in 2020
- Born: September 12, 1974 (age 50); Huelva, Spain

Pilar Gómez (born 12 September 1974) is a Spanish actress of stage, screen, and television. From Huelva, she moved to Seville to study at the Centro Andaluz de Teatro, where she met Paco León and fellow Huelva actor Javier Mora Domínguez.

== Biography ==
Gómez has won two Actors and Actresses Union Awards; best supporting actress for the film The Fury of a Patient Man and the same award in theatre for Cuando deje de llover. She also coaches young actors and won the 2018 Max Award for best leading actress.

In 2020, she was nominated for a Goya Award for her roles in the film Adiós, directed by Paco Cabezas.
