= Before the Fall (2008 film) =

2008 Spanish film by F. Javier Gutiérrez

- Theatrical release poster
- Spanish: 3 días
- Directed by: F. Javier Gutiérrez
- Screenplay by: Juan Velarde; F. Javier Gutiérrez
- Produced by: Antonio P. Pérez
- Starring: Víctor Clavijo; Mariana Cordero; Eduard Fernández
- Cinematography: Miguel A. Mora
- Edited by: Nacho Ruiz Capillas
- Music by: Antonio Meliveo
- Production companies: Maestranza Films; Green Moon Producciones; Pentagrama Films
- Release dates: 14 February 2008 (Berlinale); 25 April 2008 (Spain)
- Running time: 97 minutes
- Country: Spain
- Language: Spanish

Before the Fall (Spanish: 3 días; transl. '3 Days') is a 2008 Spanish thriller film with apocalyptic themes directed by F. Javier Gutiérrez which stars Víctor Clavijo, Mariana Cordero, and Eduard Fernández.

== Plot ==
Upon the news delivered by the UN Secretary General announcing the end of the world in 72 hours by an impact event, Ale decides to spend his time left drinking and listening music, but he has to deal with the arrival of mysterious Lucio, focusing then on helping his mother Rosa and his brother Tomás' four children instead.

== Cast ==
- Víctor Clavijo as Ale
- Mariana Cordero as Rosa
- Eduard Fernández as Lucio
- Daniel Casadellà as Emilio
- Ana de las Cuevas as Raquel
- Elvira de Armiñán as Clara
- Juan Galván as Nico
- Vicente Romero as Marcial
- Pepe Salas as Don Miguel
- Antonio Dechent as Urbano
- Alejandro Muñoz as Josema
- Miguel Zurita as Damián

== Production ==
The screenplay was penned by the director alongside Juan Velarde. The film is a Maestranza Films, Green Moon Producciones and Pentagrama Films production. It was shot in the province of Seville.

== Release ==
Selected in the 'Panorama' lineup of the 58th Berlin International Film Festival, the film was presented on 14 February 2008. It later screened at Málaga Film Festival's main competition on 5 April 2008. It was theatrically released in Spain on 25 April 2008.

== Reception ==
Jay Weissberg of Variety summed up the "unpleasant predictable" thriller as "usual psycho killer looking for revenge drama gets an end of the world overlay".

Jordi Costa of Fotogramas rated the film 3 out of 5 stars highlighting its "visual power" whilst citing its subpar writing as a negative point.

Rubén Romero of Cinemanía rated the film 3 out of 5 stars, considering that after achieving the most difficult, the director, displaying "clear symptoms of suffering from horror vacui", goes on making "unnecessary formal pirouettes and forced plot twists", albeit conceding that "all in all, [the films is] a good and necessary debut".

== Accolades ==
Year	Award	Category	Nominee(s)	Result	Ref.
2008	11th Málaga Film Festival	Golden Biznaga		Won	
2008	11th Málaga Film Festival	Best Supporting Actress	Mariana Cordero	Won	
2008	11th Málaga Film Festival	Best Makeup	Anabel Beato, Yolanda Piña	Won	
2008	11th Málaga Film Festival	Best New Screenwriter	Juan Velarde, F. Javier Gutiérrez	Won	
2009	64th CEC Medals	Best Cinematography	Miguel A. Mora	Nominated	
2009	64th CEC Medals	Best Editing	Nacho Ruiz Capillas	Won	
2009	64th CEC Medals	Best Newcomer	F. Javier Gutiérrez	Nominated	
2009	23rd Goya Awards	Best Sound	Daniel de Zayas, Jorge Marín, Maite Rivera	Won	
2009	18th Actors and Actresses Union Awards	Best Film Actor in a Leading Role	Víctor Clavijo	Nominated	
2009	18th Actors and Actresses Union Awards	Best Film Actor in a Secondary Role	Eduard Fernández	Nominated	

== See also ==
- List of Spanish films of 2008
