= Mortadelo & Filemon: The Big Adventure =

La gran aventura de Mortadelo y Filemón
- Directed by: Javier Fesser
- Written by: Javier Fesser; Guillermo Fesser
- Produced by: Luis Manso; Marina Ortiz
- Starring: Benito Pocino; Pepe Viyuela
- Cinematography: Xavi Giménez
- Edited by: Ivan Aledo
- Music by: Rafael Arnau; Mario Gosálvez
- Production companies: Sogecine; Películas Pendelton; Telecinco; Canal+ España
- Distributed by: Warner Sogefilms
- Release date: 7 February 2003
- Running time: 103 minutes
- Country: Spain
- Language: Spanish
- Box office: €22.8 million (Spain)

Mortadelo & Filemon : The Big Adventure (Spanish: La gran aventura de Mortadelo y Filemón) is a 2003 Spanish-language comedy film based on the popular Spanish comic book series Mortadelo y Filemón by Francisco Ibáñez Talavera. It also included characters from 13, Rue del Percebe, another comic by the same creator. The film was directed by Javier Fesser and stars Benito Pocino and Pepe Viyuela. It became the second highest-grossing Spanish film of all time.

== Plot ==
The adventure begins when a spy breaks into Professor Bacterio's lab and steals some of his inventions from the T.I.A. headquarters (Técnicos de Investigación Aeroterráquea, "Tía" being the Spanish word for "Aunt", thus a spoof of the CIA). Mortadelo and Filemón who work for the T.I.A. are put on the case, but Fredy, another agent, decides to beat them to it. One of the inventions is a weather control machine which the spy decides to sell to the President of Tirania, a small Eastern European dictatorship. There are numerous clashes between the spy, Fredy, and Mortadelo and Filemón (who Fredy seems to want to kill). Our heroes end up in prison after accidentally beating up the local cop once too often. They escape, Filemon's mother gets kidnapped by Fredy and taken to Tirania. The spy is killed in Fredy's place as Fredy ingratiates himself with the President, while having Filemón's mother tortured. The heroes arrive and there is a big battle where Filemón is apparently killed. Then Mortadelo receives a mortal wound, but Filemón gives him a cup of water, which turns out to be the Holy Grail, Mortadelo drinks it and heals quickly, while Fredy gets his just deserts. Mortadelo and Filemón return home, their mission successfully accomplished.

== Cast ==
- Benito Pocino as Mortadelo
- Pepe Viyuela as Filemón
- Dominique Pinon as Fredy
- Paco Sagarzazu as The President
- Mariano Venancio as Superintendent Vincente (their boss at T.I.A.)
- Janfri Topera as Professor Bacterio
- Berta Ojea as Ofelia (Vincente's secretary)
- Gustamante as a mosquito (CGI insect)
- María Isbert as Filemón's mother
- Emilio Gavira as Rompetechos
- Germán Montaner as President's servant
- Janusz Ziemniak as The spy who started it all off
- Paco Hidalgo as President's torturer
- Javier Aller as Mickey El Gigante
- José Manuel Moya as Security guard at T.I.A.
- Joan Gadea as a crooked shopkeeper.
- Juan Peiró as someone who keeps getting run over
- Andrés Gasch as Matraca, a very large man who has it in for Filemon
- Manuel Pizarro as a thief
- Coyito Fernández as a cop
- Emiliana Olmedo as Queen Elizabeth II
- The people of Gijón (crowd scene at palace, which was the Universidad Laboral)
- The people of Valencia where much of it was filmed including the final parade and also Madrid.

== Reception ==
=== Box office ===
The film set an opening weekend record for a Spanish film with a gross of €5.1 million, second only to Harry Potter and the Chamber of Secrets. It grossed €22.8 million in Spain, becoming the second highest-grossing Spanish film of all-time behind Los otros (2001).

== Sequels ==
A second film titled Mort & Phil. Mission: Save Earth was announced and released in 2008, it featured most of the same cast reprising their roles with the exception of Benito Pocino as Mortadelo, it was panned by critics and fans for its humor and writing while the performances were praised.

== See also ==
- List of Spanish films of 2003
