= One Word from You =

- Theatrical release poster
- Spanish: Una palabra tuya
- Directed by: Ángeles González Sinde
- Screenplay by: Ángeles González Sinde
- Based on: Una palabra tuya by Elvira Lindo
- Produced by: José Antonio Félez; Antón Reixa
- Starring: Malena Alterio; Esperanza Pedreño; Antonio de la Torre; Mª Alfonsa Rosso; Luis Bermejo; Chiqui Fernández
- Music by: Julio de la Rosa
- Production companies: Tesela PC; Filmanova Invest
- Release date: 22 August 2008
- Running time: 98 minutes
- Country: Spain
- Language: Spanish

One Word from You (Spanish: Una palabra tuya) is a Spanish 2008 film directed by Ángeles González Sinde based on the novel of the same name by Elvira Lindo. It stars Malena Alterio, Esperanza Pedreño and Antonio de la Torre, alongside María Alfonsa Rosso, Luis Bermejo and Chiqui Fernández.

== Plot ==
After many years without seeing each other, two Rosario meets Milagros, her friend from childhood who works as a taxi driver using a car from her uncle's taxi company. Milagros starts driving her to the bank each morning where she works as a cleaner. Together, they spend lots of time going to restaurants and pubs, but Rosario gets worried about missing so much work and one day she is fired. Milagros admits later that she never had a driving licence, which, combined with her excessive kindness to Rosario, leads her to also be fired. After that, the two women find jobs as street cleaners. In that job, Rosario meets Morsa, with whom she starts a carnal relationship.

Rosario lives with her mother, being witness to several instances of strange behaviour from her mother compatible with a condition of Alzheimer. Rosario feels very worried and alone. On the first day that Rosario brings Morsa home from work to have sex, she watches her mother walk out of her closet, horrified. As her mother's condition worsens, Rosario calls both her sister and Milagros over to the house.

After a travel to a small village in order to bury Milagros's cat, Morsa, Rosario and Milagros return to Madrid to keep working. Rosario's mother is dying and her sister comes from Barcelona to stay some days with her. Rosario's sister never took any responsibility for their mother, which is motive for tension between the sisters. Rosario reproaches her sister for always being distant towards her and her mother, while her sister gets angry with Rosario for letting Milagros stay at her home. Both women remember their childhood together, talking about the funny moments and the painful ones. Soon after, their mother stops breathing.

After her mother's death, Rosario sees the image of her mother everywhere, to a point that it scares her and doesn't let her sleep. She visits the priest of the church where her mother used to go. There, she tells him her problem and he concludes that perhaps she sees the image of her mother everywhere because she didn't want her daughter to be alone.

One night whilst sweeping and washing a plaza, Milagros and Rosario are bickering over whether or not Milagros should keep some of the trash she finds when Milagros hears a baby's cry inside of a dumpster. She reaches in and discovers a baby inside a box. Rosario insists on taking the baby to a hospital emergency room, but Milagros wants to keep him at her home. They have a heated discussion where Rosario says Milagros would not be a good mother and Milagros confesses that she is sterile. Milagros says that she loved Rosario to a point that she felt jealous because she had her own life with Morsa, and that Rosario was cold and lonely and bitter, destined to be alone. Rosario finally realizes her terrible problem of loneliness and lack of confidence with other people, though she could not admit it. Days after this incident, Rosario's boss realises that Milagros had been out for a lot of time. Rosario decides to visit her, taking some flowers and chocolates. In Milagros' home, Rosario is horrified to discover that the baby Milagros took in is already dead, in an advanced state of decomposition.

Completely devastated and depressed, both women and Morsa return to the village to bury the baby in the cemetery, and Rosario recites the 51st Psalm. Rosario and Morsa returned to Madrid, but Milagros wants to stay, something her two friends cannot understand. Worried, Rosario says that she would be all alone with nobody beside her, but Milagros insists and decides to stay in that village for good. Some days later, Milagros is telephoned by her uncle Cosmé. He informs her that his niece has been found dead in the house of the village. This fact further devastates Rosario, who goes with Milagros's uncle to assist in the burial. During the trip to the village, Cosmé tells Rosario that his niece's mother died because of overdose when she was a little child. There, Rosario sees how her friend is buried in the cemetery, in a funeral where all the village people attended.

After the hard journey to the village, Rosario admits that she must not be alone anymore, so she decided to go to Fuenlabrada, where her friend Morsa, lives. Rosario makes her way to the playground, and sees all the mothers with their children. Morsa's van stops nearby, and after a short chat, the film ends with a kiss between Morsa and Rosario.

== Cast ==
- Malena Alterio as Rosario
- Antonio de la Torre as Morsa
- Esperanza Pedreño as Milagros
- María Alfonsa Rosso as madre de Rosario
- Luis Bermejo as Lorenzo
- Marilyn Torres as Tete
- Chiqui Fernández as Palmira
- Juan Sanz as padre de Rosario

== Production ==
The film was produced by Tesela and Filmanova Invest, with the participation of TVE and Canal+. Shooting locations included Huertapelayo (Province of Guadalajara) and La Guardia (province of Toledo).

== Release ==
The film was theatrically released on 22 August 2008.

== Accolades ==
| Year | Award | Category | Nominee(s) | Result | Ref. |
|---|---|---|---|---|---|
| 2009 | CEC Medals | Best Film | | Nominated | |
| 2009 | CEC Medals | Best Adapted Screenplay | Ángeles González Sinde | Won | |
| 2009 | CEC Medals | Best Supporting Actor | Antonio de la Torre | Won | |
| 2009 | CEC Medals | Best Supporting Actress | Esperanza Pedreño | Won | |
| 2009 | 23rd Goya Awards | Best New Actor | Luis Bermejo | Nominated | |
| 2009 | 23rd Goya Awards | Best New Actress | Esperanza Pedreño | Nominated | |
| 2009 | 23rd Goya Awards | Best Original Song | "Entre tu balcón y mi ventana" by Toni Zenet, Javier Laguna, José Taboada | Nominated | |
| 2009 | 23rd Goya Awards | Best Adapted Screenplay | Ángeles González Sinde | Nominated | |
| 2009 | 18th Actors and Actresses Union Awards | Best New Actress | Esperanza Pedreño | Nominated | |

== See also ==
- List of Spanish films of 2008
