= Blood in May =

- Theatrical release poster
- Spanish: Sangre de mayo
- Directed by: José Luis Garci
- Written by: José Luis Garci; Horacio Valcárcel
- Based on: La corte de Carlos IV & El 19 de marzo y el 2 de mayo by Benito Pérez Galdós
- Starring: Quim Gutiérrez; Paula Echevarría; Manuel Galiana; Lucía Jiménez; Enrique Villén; Miguel Rellán; Tina Sáinz; Natalia Millán; Manuel Tejada; Francisco Algora; Fernando Guillén Cuervo; Carlos Larrañaga
- Cinematography: Félix Monti
- Edited by: José Luis Garci
- Music by: Pablo Cervantes
- Production companies: Nickel Odeon Dos S.A.; TeleMadrid
- Distributed by: Alta Classics
- Release date: 3 October 2008
- Running time: 152 minutes
- Country: Spain
- Language: Spanish
- Budget: €15 million

Blood in May (Spanish: Sangre de mayo) is a 2008 Spanish historical drama film directed by José Luis Garci and starring Quim Gutiérrez and Paula Echevarría. The plot is inspired on work by Benito Pérez Galdós and takes place around the events of 2 May 1808, when the people of Madrid rose up in rebellion against French occupation. The film was one of three films Spain submitted to be nominated for the Academy Award for Best Foreign Language Film. The film was disappointing in terms of audience and critical reception.

== Plot ==
Set in 1808, the story follows young Madrid typesetter Gabriel Araceli and his orphan girlfriend Inés. Amidst the historic March 19 uprising against Manuel Godoy in Aranjuez, Gabriel visits Inés, leading her uncle Don Celestino to allow her to relocate to Madrid with relatives Don Mauro and Restituta.

Gabriel takes a job nearby and, aided by Juan de Dios, attempts to rescue Inés from Don Mauro's scheme to marry her, eventually escaping during the welcoming celebration for the new King Ferdinand. Under the pretext of their way to Portugal, Napoleon's troops entered Spain. The French soldiers are not popular among the population of Madrid, which regards them as invaders. The plans of Gabriel and Inés to flee to Cádiz are interrupted by the French occupation and the 2 May popular revolt against imperial outposts breaks out. Gabriel Araceli is involved in the fierce battles taking place in the Puerta del Sol and elsewhere in Madrid.

== Cast ==
- Quim Gutiérrez as Gabriel
- Paula Echevarría as Inés
- Manuel Galiana as Don Celestino
- Enrique Villén as Paco "El Chispas"
- Fernando Guillén Cuervo as Regente de imprenta
- Tina Sáinz as Doña Restituta
- Natalia Millán as Anastasia
- Carlos Larrañaga as Isidoro Máiquez
- Lucía Jiménez as Plata
- Miguel Rellán as Mauro Requejo
- Manuel Tejada as Godoy
- Paco Algora as Escritor Comella

== Production ==
The film is a free adaptation of Benito Pérez Galdós' novels La corte de Carlos IV and El 19 de marzo y el 2 de mayo, part of the Episodios Nacionales. The production featured a large €15 million budget. The public subsidies provided by the right-leaning regional administration of Madrid represented the largest ever for a Spanish film.

== Release ==
Distributed by Alta Classics, the film was theatrically released in Spain on 3 October 2008. It proved to be a massive box-office failure, only grossing €0.7 million in the first month of its theatrical run.

== Reception ==
=== Critical response ===
Jonathan Holland of Variety deemed the film to be "an ambitious, often intriguing 200th-anniversary retelling" of the Dos de Mayo uprising in which Garci is seen "aiming for that grand, sweeping feel but failing to achieve it".

Javier Ocaña of El País assessed that Garci (with help from Valcárcel) had managed to craft a "solid" work, finding himself comfortable in street conversations, also considering that he had found the "perfect" Gabriel Araceli created by Galdós in the naturalist performance of Gutiérrez, but, that, when the time for the outburst of violence comes, the film falls short.

=== Accolades ===
Year	Award	Category	Nominee(s)	Result	Ref.
2009	64th CEC Medals	Best Film		Nominated	
2009	64th CEC Medals	Best Director	José Luis Garci	Nominated	
2009	64th CEC Medals	Best Supporting Actor	Miguel Rellán	Nominated	
2009	64th CEC Medals	Best Supporting Actress	Tina Sáinz	Nominated	
2009	64th CEC Medals	Best Adapted Screenplay	José Luis Garci, Horacio Valcárcel	Nominated	
2009	64th CEC Medals	Best Cinematography	Félix Monti	Won	
2009	64th CEC Medals	Best Music	Pablo Cervantes	Nominated	
2009	23rd Goya Awards	Best Supporting Actress	Tina Sáinz	Nominated	
2009	23rd Goya Awards	Best Cinematography	Félix Monti	Nominated	
2009	23rd Goya Awards	Best Art Direction	Gil Parrondo	Nominated	
2009	23rd Goya Awards	Best Costume Design	Lourdes de Orduña	Nominated	
2009	23rd Goya Awards	Best Makeup and Hairstyles	Alicia López, Josefa Morales, Romana González	Nominated	
2009	23rd Goya Awards	Best Sound	José Antonio Bermúdez, Miguel Rejas	Nominated	
2009	23rd Goya Awards	Best Special Effects	Alberto Nombela, Juan Ramón Molina	Nominated	

== See also ==
- List of Spanish films of 2008
