= Camino (2008 film) =

- Directed by: Javier Fesser
- Written by: Javier Fesser
- Produced by: Luis Manso; Jaume Roures
- Starring: Nerea Camacho; Carme Elías; Mariano Venancio; Manuela Vellés
- Cinematography: Alex Catalán
- Edited by: Javier Fesser
- Music by: Rafa Arnau; Mario Gosálvez
- Production companies: Mediapro; Películas Pendelton
- Distributed by: Alta Classics
- Release dates: 25 September 2008 (SSIFF); 17 October 2008 (Spain)
- Running time: 143 minutes
- Country: Spain
- Language: Spanish

Camino is a 2008 Spanish drama film written, directed and edited by Javier Fesser starring Nerea Camacho as the title character alongside Carmen Elías, Mariano Venancio and Manuela Vellés.

The plot is inspired by (and dedicated to) the real story of Alexia González-Barros, a girl who died from spinal cancer at age 14 in 1985 and who is in process of canonization. The girl's family (related to the Opus Dei) did not agree with the film and so controversy mired the film since the very beginning, and arguably only served to increase interest in the film.

The film swept the 23rd Goya Awards, winning in 6 categories, including 4 of the Big 5 (Best Picture, Director, Original Screenplay and Actress).

== Plot ==
Camino and her family belong to the Opus Dei. She develops a crush for a boy (Cuco/Jesús). Camino's elder sister is a Catholic acolyte, deliberately kept from contacting her family. Suppressing open signs of normal maternal grief, the mother seems almost inhuman in urging her dying daughter to "offer up" her suffering for Jesus. The father struggles to protect his daughter from a concerted effort to canonize her (even before her death) by his wife, elder daughter, and Catholic officials. Even the hospital medical staff seem to be complicit in this.

Jesús, the name Camino invokes, is not Christ, but that of her normal schoolgirl crush. This is shown in dream sequences she experiences throughout the film.

== Cast ==
- Nerea Camacho as Camino
- Carmen Elías as Gloria Camino's mother.
- Mariano Venancio as José, Camino's father.
- Manuela Vellés as Nuria, Camino's elder sister
- Ana Gracia as Inés
- Lola Casamayor as Tía Marita
- Lucas Manzano as Cuco
- Pepe Ocio as Don Miguel Ángel
- Claudia Otero as Begoña
- Jordi Dauder as Don Luis
- Emilio Gavira as Mr. Meebles
- Miriam Raya as Elena

== Release ==
The film premiered at the San Sebastián International Film Festival's official competition. Distributed by Alta Classics, it was theatrically released in Spain on 17 October 2008.

== Reception ==
The film won six Goya Awards, including best picture, best director, and best original screenplay.

== Criticism by the González-Barros family ==
Alexia's siblings said that the film was a distortion of the girl's history. They also objected to Fesser's use of Alexia's full name in his dedication, despite him having undertaken not to directly identify her.

In reaction to the film, director Pedro Delgado released a documentary about the life of Alexia González-Barros in 2011, including video footage from the latter's family archives.

== Accolades ==
Year	Award	Category	Nominee(s)	Result	Ref.
2009	14th Forqué Awards	Best Picture		Won	
2009	23rd Goya Awards	Best Film		Won	
2009	23rd Goya Awards	Best Director	Javier Fesser	Won	
2009	23rd Goya Awards	Best Original Screenplay	Javier Fesser	Won	
2009	23rd Goya Awards	Best Actress	Carme Elias	Won	
2009	23rd Goya Awards	Best Supporting Actor	Jordi Dauder	Won	
2009	23rd Goya Awards	Best New Actress	Nerea Camacho	Won	
2009	23rd Goya Awards	Best Special Effects	Arturo Balseiro, Ferrán Piquer, Raúl Romanillos	Nominated	
2009	18th Actors and Actresses Union Awards	Best Film Actress in a Leading Role	Carmen Elías	Won	
2009	18th Actors and Actresses Union Awards	Best Film Actor in a Leading Role	Mariano Venancio	Won	
2009	18th Actors and Actresses Union Awards	Best Film Actor in a Secondary Role	Jordi Dauder	Won	
2009	18th Actors and Actresses Union Awards	Best Film Actress in a Minor Role	Lola Casamayor	Won	
2009	18th Actors and Actresses Union Awards	Best Film Actress in a Minor Role	Ana Gracia	Nominated	
2009	18th Actors and Actresses Union Awards	Best Film Actor in a Minor Role	Pepe Ocio	Nominated	
2009	Vilnius International Film Festival	Audience's Award for Best Film		Won	

== See also ==
- List of Spanish films of 2008
