= Tina Sainz =

Spanish actress

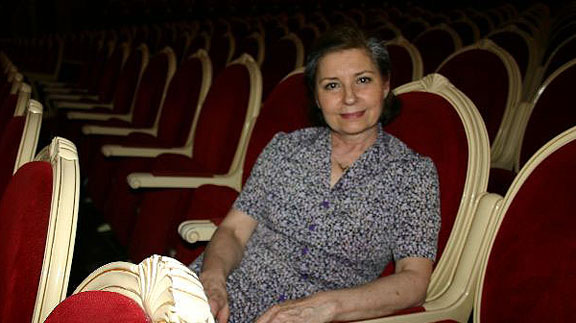
- Sainz in 2006
- Born: María Fernanda Agustina Sainz Rubio; 26 February 1945 (age 80); Madrid, Spain

María Fernanda Agustina Sainz Rubio (born 26 February 1945) better known as Tina Sainz is a Spanish actress. She has appeared in such films as Sangre de Mayo and Story of a Kiss. Her television credits include Recuerda cuándo, Compañeros and Estudio 1. In 2017, she appeared in the Netflix series Cable Girls.
