= Antonio P. Pérez =

Spanish film producer

Antonio Pérez Pérez
- Born: 1954 (age 71–72); Córdoba, Spain
- Occupation: film producer
- Known for: founder of Maestranza Films

Antonio Pérez Pérez (born 1954) often credited as Antonio P. Pérez, is a Spanish film producer, founder of Maestranza Films, noted as the most important film producer in Andalusia.

== Biography ==
Antonio Pérez Pérez was born in 1954 in Córdoba, Pérez was raised in Andújar, where he developed an early interest in cinema. He dropped out from a degree in biology, graduating in industrial engineering. He founded Maestranza Films in the late 1980s. He also worked as a producer through Videoplaning, oriented towards the television industry.

== Films ==
He has since produced an extensive number of films, including Belmonte (1995), Alone (1999), Nobody Knows Anybody (1999), Fugitivas (2000), Atún y chocolate (2004), Habana Blues (2005), Rough Winds (2006), Thieves (2007), Before the Fall (2008), Return to Hansala (2008), The Sleeping Voice (2011), and El Niño (2014), Toro (2016), The Ignorance of Blood (2016) and Lord, Give Me Patience (2017).

== Awards ==
EGEDA recognised him with its Lifetime Achievement Gold Medal, which was handed to him at the 22nd Forqué Awards in 2017.
