= The Blind Sunflowers (film) =

- Spanish: Los girasoles ciegos
- Directed by: José Luis Cuerda
- Written by: José Luis Cuerda; Rafael Azcona
- Based on: The Blind Sunflowers by Alberto Méndez
- Produced by: Fernando Bovaira; José Luis Cuerda; Emiliano Otegui
- Starring: Maribel Verdú; Javier Cámara; Raúl Arévalo; Irene Escolar; Martiño Rivas; José Ángel Egido; Roger Princep
- Cinematography: Hans Burmann
- Edited by: Nacho Ruiz Capillas
- Music by: Lucio Godoy
- Distributed by: Sogecine
- Release date: August 29, 2008
- Running time: 98 minutes
- Country: Spain
- Language: Spanish

The Blind Sunflowers (Spanish: Los girasoles ciegos) is a 2008 Spanish film directed by José Luis Cuerda, who wrote the screenplay alongside Rafael Azcona, based on the 2004 novel The Blind Sunflowers by Alberto Méndez. The film stars Maribel Verdú, Javier Cámara and Raúl Arévalo.

This film was Spain's 81st Academy Awards official submission to Foreign Language Film category, but it was not selected.

== Plot ==
The plot follows the life of a family, former sympathizers of the Spanish Republic, during the early 1940s. Their lives are disrupted when a young priest falls in love with the mother. The film is set in Ourense, 1940 where a disorientated deacon, named Salvador returns to the seminary of Ourense where the Rector delays Salvador's access to priesthood for a year. Salvador begins teaching in a school where he meets with Lorenzo, the son of Elena, who Salvador thinks is widowed. This opportunity multiplies with the deacon becoming obsessed with her, abusing her mentally and physically. We realise that Salvador is threatening Elena's family because of his obsession.

== Cast ==
- Maribel Verdú as Elena
- Javier Cámara as Ricardo
- Raúl Arévalo as Salvador
- Roger Príncep as Lorenzo
- José Ángel Egido as Rector
- Martín Rivas as Lalo
- Irene Escolar as Elenita
- Juan Antonio Quintana
- Fernando Ransanz
- David Janer as the falangist
- Ricardo de Barreiro as Fernández
- Miguel de Lira as the brother
- Fanny de Castro as aunt Lola
- Carmen Losa as the nephew
- Mario Roldán
- Santi Prego
- Xosé Manuel Olveira 'Pico'
- Íñigo Navares as Paquito
- Patrick Criado
- Sergio Murillo
- Daniel Heras
- Francisco Heras
- Laura Ponte as the woman who cleans
- Emiliano Otegui
- Camilo Rodríguez
- Karmele Aranburu as the actress
- Luis Callejo as the military prosecutor
- Silvia Giner as the sister of Capitán Alegría
- Alexia Pardo

== Accolades ==
Year	Award	Category	Nominee(s)	Result	Ref.
2009	23rd Goya Awards	Best Film		Nominated	
2009	23rd Goya Awards	Best Director	José Luis Cuerda	Nominated	
2009	23rd Goya Awards	Best Adapted Screenplay	Rafael Azcona & José Luis Cuerda	Won	
2009	23rd Goya Awards	Best Original Score	Lucio Godoy	Nominated	
2009	23rd Goya Awards	Best Actor	Raúl Arévalo	Nominated	
2009	23rd Goya Awards	Best Actress	Maribel Verdú	Nominated	
2009	23rd Goya Awards	Best Supporting Actor	José Ángel Egido	Nominated	
2009	23rd Goya Awards	Best New Actor	Martiño Rivas	Nominated	
2009	23rd Goya Awards	Best Production Supervision	Emiliano Otegui	Nominated	
2009	23rd Goya Awards	Best Cinematography	Hans Burmann	Nominated	
2009	23rd Goya Awards	Best Editing	Nacho Ruiz Capillas	Nominated	
2009	23rd Goya Awards	Best Art Direction	Balter Gallart	Nominated	
2009	23rd Goya Awards	Best Costume Design	Sonia Grande	Nominated	
2009	23rd Goya Awards	Best Makeup and Hairstyles	Fermín Galán & Sylvie Imbert	Nominated	
2009	23rd Goya Awards	Best Sound	Alfonso Raposo, María Sternberg & Ricardo Steinberg	Nominated	
2009	18th Actors and Actresses Union Awards	Best Film Actress in a Leading Role	Maribel Verdú	Nominated	
2009	18th Actors and Actresses Union Awards	Best Film Actor in a Leading Role	Raúl Arévalo	Nominated	
2009	18th Actors and Actresses Union Awards	Best Film Actor in a Minor Role	José Ángel Egido	Won	

== See also ==
- List of Spanish films of 2008
- List of Spanish submissions for the Academy Award for Best International Feature Film
- List of submissions to the 81st Academy Awards for Best Foreign Language Film
- The Endless Trench, another Spanish film about a man hiding in his home after the war.
