= Herederos =

- Created by: David Paniagua; Pablo Tébar
- Starring: Concha Velasco; Mar Regueras; Ginés García Millán; Félix Gómez
- Country of origin: Spain
- Original language: Spanish
- No. of seasons: 3
- No. of episodes: 37

Production
- Production company: Cuarzo Producciones for Televisión Española

Original release
- Network: La 1
- Release: 25 September 2007 – 3 February 2009

Herederos (transl. Heirs) is a prime time Spanish television drama series produced by Cuarzo Producciones for Televisión Española that was broadcast on La 1 of Televisión Española from 2007 to 2009. It stars Concha Velasco as Carmen Orozco, the matriarch of the Orozcos, a rich and powerful family in the world of bullfighting troubled by betrayals, hierarchical struggles, machinations, mysteries and personal confrontations.

== Cast and characters ==
- Concha Velasco as Carmen Orozco Argenta
- Helio Pedregal as Rafael García del Hierro
- Mar Regueras as Julia Orozco
- Ginés García Millán as Bernardo Sánchez
- Félix Gómez as Jacobo García Orozco
- Lidia Navarro as Verónica García Orozco
- Iker Lastra as Nino Moro Galán
- Petra Martínez as Teresa Galán
- Cristina Brondo as Cecilia Paniagua
- Joaquín Hinojosa as Salvador Expósito
- Álvaro de Luna as Antonio Moro
- Cristina Castaño as Rocío Urquijo
- Irene Montalà as Mónica
- Asier Etxeandia as Gorka
- Conchita Goyanes as Carlota
- Fabio Testi as Enrique Escarpa
- Lluís Homar as Luis Soler
- Julieta Serrano as psychiatrist
- Carme Elías as Manuela / Carmen Ruíz
- Nuria Gago as Lorena

== Episodes ==
Season	Episodes	Originally released		Avg. viewers (millions)	Avg. share
Season	Episodes	First released	Last released	Avg. viewers (millions)	Avg. share
1	15	25 September 2007	4 February 2008	2.818	15.8%
2	13	2 September 2008	25 November 2008	2.450	13.8%
3	9	2 December 2008	3 February 2009	2.618	13.9%
