= The Fury of a Patient Man =

2016 film

- Film poster
- Spanish: Tarde para la ira
- Directed by: Raúl Arévalo
- Written by: Raúl Arévalo; David Pulido
- Produced by: Beatriz Bodegas
- Starring: Antonio de la Torre; Luis Callejo; Ruth Díaz; Raúl Jiménez; Manolo Solo; Font García; Pilar Gómez; Alicia Rubio
- Cinematography: Arnau Valls Colomer
- Edited by: Ángel Hernández Zoido
- Music by: Lucio Godoy
- Production companies: La Canica Films; Agosto, La Película AIE
- Distributed by: Entertainment One Films Spain
- Release dates: 2 September 2016 (Venice); 9 September 2016 (Spain)
- Running time: 92 minutes
- Country: Spain
- Language: Spanish

The Fury of a Patient Man (Spanish: Tarde para la ira) is a 2016 Spanish thriller film directed by Raúl Arévalo, which stars Antonio de la Torre, Luis Callejo, and Ruth Díaz.

The film won four Goya Awards, namely Best Film, Best New Director, Best Supporting Actor (Manolo Solo), and Best Original Screenplay.

== Plot ==
The film is set in Madrid in August 2007. Curro is imprisoned after taking part in the robbery of a jewellery store. Eight years later, he leaves prison with the intention of beginning a new life, together with his girlfriend Ana and his son, but he encounters an unexpected situation and a stranger, José, who will take him to an unknown course, close to vengeance.

== Cast ==
- Antonio de la Torre as José
- Luis Callejo as Curro
- Alicia Rubio as Carmen
- Ruth Díaz as Ana
- Font García as Julio
- Raúl Jiménez as Juanjo
- Chani Martín as Marcelo
- Manolo Solo as Santi
- Pilar Gómez as Pili

== Production ==
The film was produced by La Canica Films and Agosto AIE in association with Film Factory and Palomar, with the participation of RTVE and Movistar+ and the collaboration of ICAA and Crea SGR.

== Release ==
The film made its debut in the Horizons section at the 73rd Venice International Film Festival. It was also screened in the Discovery section at the 2016 Toronto International Film Festival. Distributed by Entertainment One Films Spain, it was theatrically released in Spain on 9 September 2016.

== Critical reception ==
Jessica Kiang of Variety deemed the film to be "a taut little story of devolving nastiness, uncompromising in its relentless, western-influenced linearity", yet also with an element of surprise.

Jonathan Holland of The Hollywood Reporter deemed the film to be "broodingly intense revenge thriller that reflects the fine, broodingly intense performance driving it relentlessly forward".

== Awards and nominations ==
Year	Award	Category	Nominee(s)	Result	Ref.
2017	22nd Forqué Awards	Best Film		Won	
2017	22nd Forqué Awards	Best Actor	Antonio de la Torre	Nominated	
2017	4th Feroz Awards	Best Drama Film		Won	
2017	4th Feroz Awards	Best Director	Raúl Arévalo	Won	
2017	4th Feroz Awards	Best Screenplay	Raúl Arévalo & David Pulido	Won	
2017	4th Feroz Awards	Best Main Actor	Antonio de la Torre	Nominated	
2017	4th Feroz Awards	Best Supporting Actor	Manolo Solo	Won	
2017	4th Feroz Awards	Best Supporting Actress	Ruth Díaz	Won	
2017	4th Feroz Awards	Best Film Poster		Nominated	
2017	31st Goya Awards	Best Film		Won	
2017	31st Goya Awards	Best Actor	Antonio de la Torre	Nominated	
2017	31st Goya Awards	Best Actor	Luis Callejo	Nominated	
2017	31st Goya Awards	Best Supporting Actor	Manolo Solo	Won	
2017	31st Goya Awards	Best New Actor	Raúl Jiménez	Nominated	
2017	31st Goya Awards	Best New Actress	Ruth Díaz	Nominated	
2017	31st Goya Awards	Best Original Screenplay	Raúl Arévalo & David Pulido	Won	
2017	31st Goya Awards	Best New Director	Raúl Arévalo	Won	
2017	31st Goya Awards	Best Cinematography	Arnau Valls Colomer	Nominated	
2017	31st Goya Awards	Best Editing	Ángel Hernández Zoido	Nominated	
2017	31st Goya Awards	Best Costume Design	Alberto Valcárcel & Cristina Rodríguez	Nominated	
2017	26th Actors and Actresses Union Awards	Best Film Actor in a Leading Role	Antonio de la Torre	Nominated	
2017	26th Actors and Actresses Union Awards	Best Film Actor in a Leading Role	Luis Callejo	Won	
2017	26th Actors and Actresses Union Awards	Best Film Actress in a Minor Role	Pilar Gómez	Won	
2017	26th Actors and Actresses Union Awards	Best Film Actor in a Minor Role	Manolo Solo	Won	
2017	26th Actors and Actresses Union Awards	Best New Actress	Ruth Díaz	Won	
2017	26th Actors and Actresses Union Awards	Best New Actor	Font García	Won	
2017	59th Ariel Awards	Best Ibero-American Film		Nominated	

== Remake ==
In July 2017, Studio 8 acquired the rights to remake the film, with Albert Hughes set to direct and The Picture Company will co-produce the remake.
