= Antonietta Meo =

Italian venerable (1930-1936)

Venerable Antonietta Meo
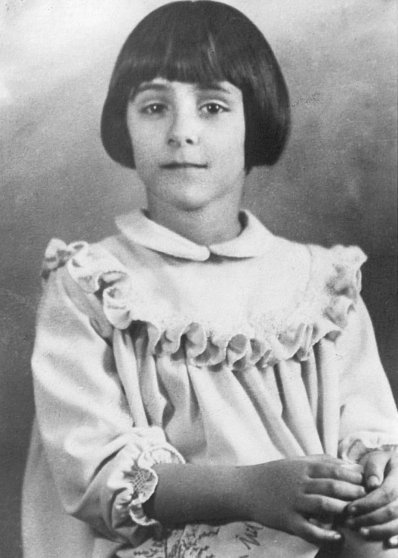
- Portrait of Antonietta Meo, circa 1937
- Born: 15 December 1930; Rome, Italy
- Died: 3 July 1937 (aged 6); Rome, Italy

Antonietta Meo (15 December 1930 – 3 July 1937), nicknamed "Nennolina", was an Italian girl who died of osteosarcoma. Currently, she is the youngest person the Catholic Church has considered beatifying.

== Life and death ==
Meo was born as the second daughter of Michele and Maria Meo, an upper middle class household in Rome, and had an older sister named Margherita. She attended Catholic schools as an active, charismatic girl who led playmates in many games even after falling ill, being well-liked for her kindness. Her teachers said she stood out because of her charm, humor, and joyful personality.

Meo was diagnosed with osteosarcoma at five after she fell and injured her knee, and the injury didn't heal. When her leg had to be amputated, she bore the ordeal "cheerfully." She received an artificial leg, letting her keep playing with other children. Catholic theologians have called her a "mystic" because the six-year-old wrote "extraordinary" letters to Jesus Christ in her last months. "Dear baby Jesus, you are holy, you are good," she wrote in one of the letters. "Help me, grant me your grace and give me back my leg. If you don't want to, then may your will be done."

At first, she dictated letters to her mother; later, she wrote poems and letters herself and left each at the foot of her crucifix. One letter said partially, "Dear Jesus, I love you very much. I want to abandon myself in your hands [...] I want to abandon myself in your arms. Do with me what you want. [...] Help me with your grace. You help me, since without your grace, I can do nothing." She wrote or dictated over 100 letters to Jesus or the Virgin Mary, describing "holy visions" in many of them. After Mass, people sometimes saw her approach the tabernacle and say, "Jesus, come and play with me!"

Meo viewed the loss of her leg as a sacrifice to Jesus for the conversion of sinners. "I am very happy that Jesus gave me this problem so that I may be his dearest one," she told her father after her leg was amputated. She also remarked, "Pain is like fabric, the stronger it is, the more it's worth" to her father on a different occasion. Sources disagree on the exact wording of this statement. "For an instant I lie down on my wound, so as to offer more pain to Jesus," she spoke to her spiritual guide. "When you feel pain, you have to keep quiet and offer it to Jesus for a sinner. Jesus suffered so much for us, but He hadn't committed any sin: He was God. How could we complain, we who are sinners and always offend him?" she told her mother. Meo was eager to receive the sacraments of the Catholic Church and received the initiation sacraments (baptism, confirmation and the holy communion) as well as the extreme unction in June 1937.

Meo insisted on writing one last letter to Jesus a few days before her death but failed to finish it due to her illness. She asked Jesus to care for everyone she loved and for strength to bear her pain. She ended the letter with the words, "Your little girl sends you a lot of kisses." She told her mother when it was time for her to die. "In a few hours, I will die, but I will not suffer anymore, and you shouldn't cry. I should have lived a few days longer, but Saint Theresa of the Child Jesus said, "it's enough!" After Meo died, her mother received a vision of her daughter in a glorified state, reassuring her that she was now in heaven.

The Basilica of Santa Croce in Rome, where Meo was baptized and spent much of her time in meditation, holds a shrine containing relics from her life. The church moved her body inside in 1999.

== Canonization efforts ==
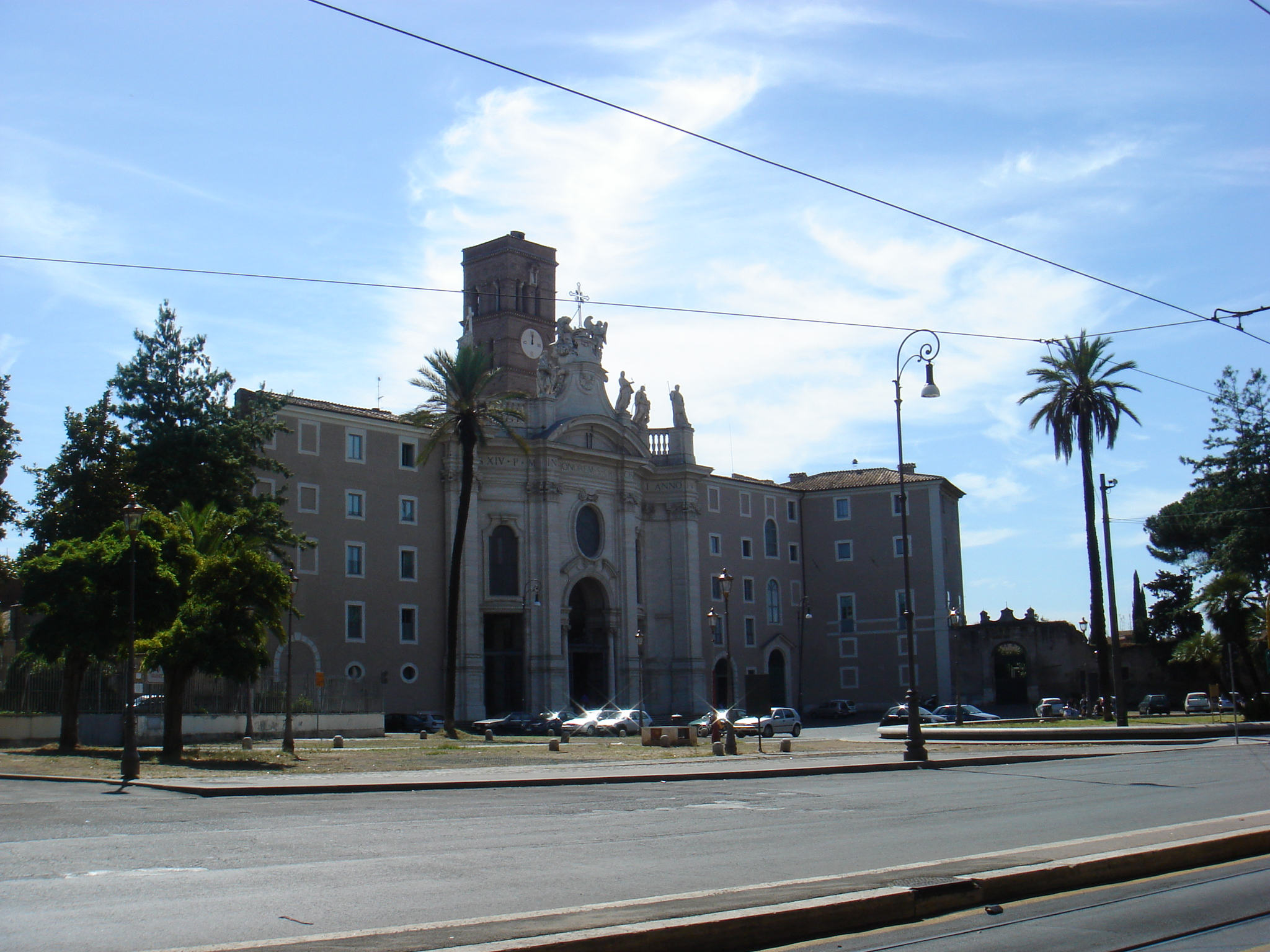
A shrine to Antonietta Meo at the Basilica Santa Croce in Gerusalemme in Rome

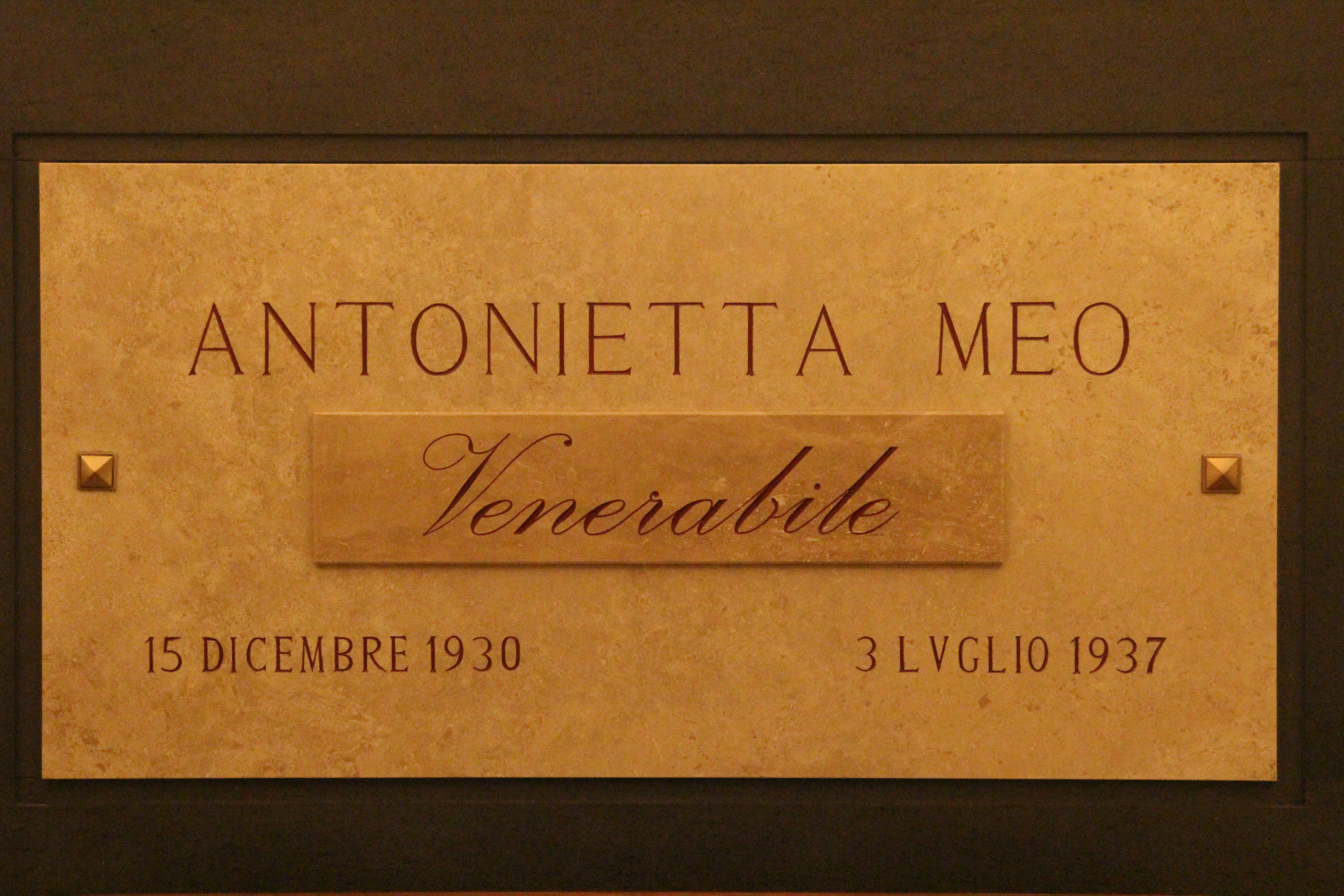
A plate for Antonietta Meo in Basilica Santa Croce in Gerusalemme

Before 1981, the Roman Congregation for Saints required that a candidate for sainthood reach some level of maturity. In 1981, this rule was relaxed by the Pope. The Congregation explained that "it is possible to speak of a human being being precocious in their sense of good and evil". The Catholic Church commemorates the Holy Innocents as the first martyrs. The youngest saints canonized in modern times, Francisco and Jacinta Marto, became the two youngest non-martyred Catholic saints in 2017. The next-youngest modern saint, Maria Goretti, died in 1902 at age eleven and was canonized in 1950 as a virgin and martyr.

Efforts to promote the recognition of Nennolina as a Saint began soon after her death. Her case went to the Roman Congregation for the Causes of Saints on 23 May 1972. Pope Benedict XVI approved a decree on 17 December 2007, recognizing the girl's heroic virtues and approving the opening of the procedure leading to beatification. A woman in Indiana has already attributed one of two necessary miracles to Nennolina, claiming she became Hepatitis C-free after invoking the girl's help in prayer.

== See also ==
- Carlo Acutis – young British-born Italian Saint who died of leukemia
- Chiara Badano – young Italian Blessed who also died of osteosarcoma
