= My Prison Yard =

- Theatrical release poster
- Spanish: El patio de mi cárcel
- Directed by: Belén Macías
- Screenplay by: Belén Macías; Arantxa Cuesta; Elena Cánovas
- Produced by: Esther García
- Starring: Candela Peña; Verónica Echegui; Ana Wagener; Violeta Pérez; Blanca Portillo; Patricia Reyes Spíndola
- Cinematography: Joaquín Manchado
- Edited by: Alejandro Lázaro
- Music by: Juan Pablo Compaired
- Production company: El Deseo
- Distributed by: Warner Bros. Pictures
- Release dates: 22 September 2008 (SSIFF); 26 September 2008 (Spain)
- Country: Spain
- Language: Spanish

My Prison Yard (Spanish: El patio de mi cárcel) is a 2008 Spanish prison drama film directed by Belén Macías. The female-dominated cast stars Candela Peña and Verónica Echegui alongside Ana Wagener, Blanca Portillo, Patricia Reyes Spíndola and Violeta Pérez.

== Plot ==
A prison drama set in the 1980s, the plot tracks a group of female inmates who create a theatre group with help from a female prison officer, Mar.

== Cast ==
- Candela Peña as Mar
- Verónica Echegui as Isa
- Ana Wagener as Dolores
- Blanca Portillo as Adela
- Patricia Reyes Spíndola as Aurora
- Violeta Pérez as Rosa
- Natalia Mateo as Ajo
- Maria Pau Pigem as Maika
- Tatiana Astengo as Luisa
- Ledicia Sola as Pilar
- Blanca Apilánez as Cristina
- Susi Sánchez as Julia
- Nuria Mencía
- Adriana Ugarte as Alejandra

== Production ==
An El Deseo and Warner Bros. Entertainment España production, My Prison Yard began filming began on 8 October 2007. Shooting lasted for 8 weeks, taking place in between the Madrid region and the province of Guadalajara.

== Release ==
The film was presented on 22 September 2008 at the Kursaal as part of the main competition of the 56th San Sebastián International Film Festival (SSIFF).

== Reception ==
Irene Crespo of Cinemanía gave the film 3 out of 5 stars, considering that while not a promise of thematic renewal for Spanish cinema, the film seems to be a firm commitment to tell the social stories with renewed impetus.

Jay Weissberg of Variety considered the film an "ultra-straight" drama, taking "the prize for most earnest and least self-aware women-in-prison film of the decade, if not longer", assessing that while never rising above TV movie material the female cast pulled solid and genuinely sympathetic performances.

== Accolades ==
Year	Award	Category	Nominee(s)	Result	Ref.
2009	64th CEC Medals	Best Actress	Verónica Echegui	Nominated	
2009	23rd Goya Awards	Best New Director	Belén Macías	Nominated	
2009	23rd Goya Awards	Goya Award for Best Actress	Verónica Echegui	Nominated	
2009	23rd Goya Awards	Goya Award for Best New Actress	Ana Wagener	Nominated	
2009	23rd Goya Awards	Goya Award for Best Original Song	"Podemos volar juntos" by Raul Sánchez Zafra, Juan Pablo Compaired	Nominated	
2009	18th Actors and Actresses Union Awards	Best Film Actress in a Secondary Role	Ana Wagener	Won	
2009	18th Actors and Actresses Union Awards	Best Film Actress in a Minor Role	Natalia Mateo	Nominated	
2009	18th Actors and Actresses Union Awards	Best New Actress	Violeta Pérez	Won	

== See also ==
- List of Spanish films of 2008
