= Chef's Special =

- Theatrical release poster
- Spanish: Fuera de carta
- Directed by: Nacho G. Velilla
- Screenplay by: Nacho G. Velilla; David S. Olivas; Oriol Capel; Antonio Sánchez
- Produced by: Daniel Écija; Tedy Villalba; Nacho G. Velilla
- Starring: Javier Cámara; Lola Dueñas; Fernando Tejero; Benjamín Vicuña; Chus Lampreave; Luis Varela; Cristina Marcos; Alexandra Jiménez; Junio Valverde
- Cinematography: David Omedes
- Edited by: Ángel Hernández-Zoido
- Music by: Juanjo Javierre
- Distributed by: Warner Bros. Pictures
- Release date: 11 April 2008
- Running time: 111 minutes
- Country: Spain
- Language: Spanish

Chef's Special (Spanish: Fuera de carta) is a 2008 Spanish film directed by Nacho G. Velilla. It stars Javier Cámara, Benjamín Vicuña, Lola Dueñas, and Fernando Tejero. It centers on homosexuality and the decision to come out, following men who have had relationships with women to hide their own sexuality, to the point of even having kids. The film also deals with the theme of single parents.

== Plot ==
Maxi is the chef and owner of a restaurant, Xantarella, who aspires to win a Michelin Star but is having financial difficulties. He helps Alex, a maître d’ who is desperately looking for a boyfriend. It has been a while since Maxi has come out of the closet and declared his homosexuality. Since then, he left behind his wife and his two children whom he has not seen in the last seven years. His wife's death leads him to have to take care of his two estranged kids. Meanwhile, an Argentinian soccer player, Horacio, comes into Maxi and Alex's lives and passes himself off as heterosexual when in reality he is homosexual. The film develops from the love triangle formed between Maxi, Álex, and Horacio, Maxi's responsibility to his kids, and the future of the restaurant.

== Cast ==
- Javier Cámara as Maxi
- Lola Dueñas as Alex
- Fernando Tejero as Ramiro
- Benjamín Vicuña as Horacio
- Luis Varela as Jaime
- Chus Lampreave as Celia
- Cristina Marcos as Marta
- Alexandra Jiménez as Paula
- Junio Valverde as Edu

== Release ==
The film premiered in Spain on 11 April 2008 and was a success in the box office, earning almost €1 million in its first weekend and ending the year as the sixth highest-grossing Spanish film grossing €5,11 million.

== Reception ==
The critical reception was not as favorable, receiving negative reviews from important publications like El País, El Mundo, and ABC.

== Accolades ==
Year	Award	Category	Nominee(s)	Result	Ref.
2009	23rd Goya Awards	Best Actor	Javier Cámara	Nominated	
2009	23rd Goya Awards	Best Supporting Actor	Fernando Tejero	Nominated	

== See also ==
- List of Spanish films of 2008
