= Luis Bermejo (actor) =

Spanish actor

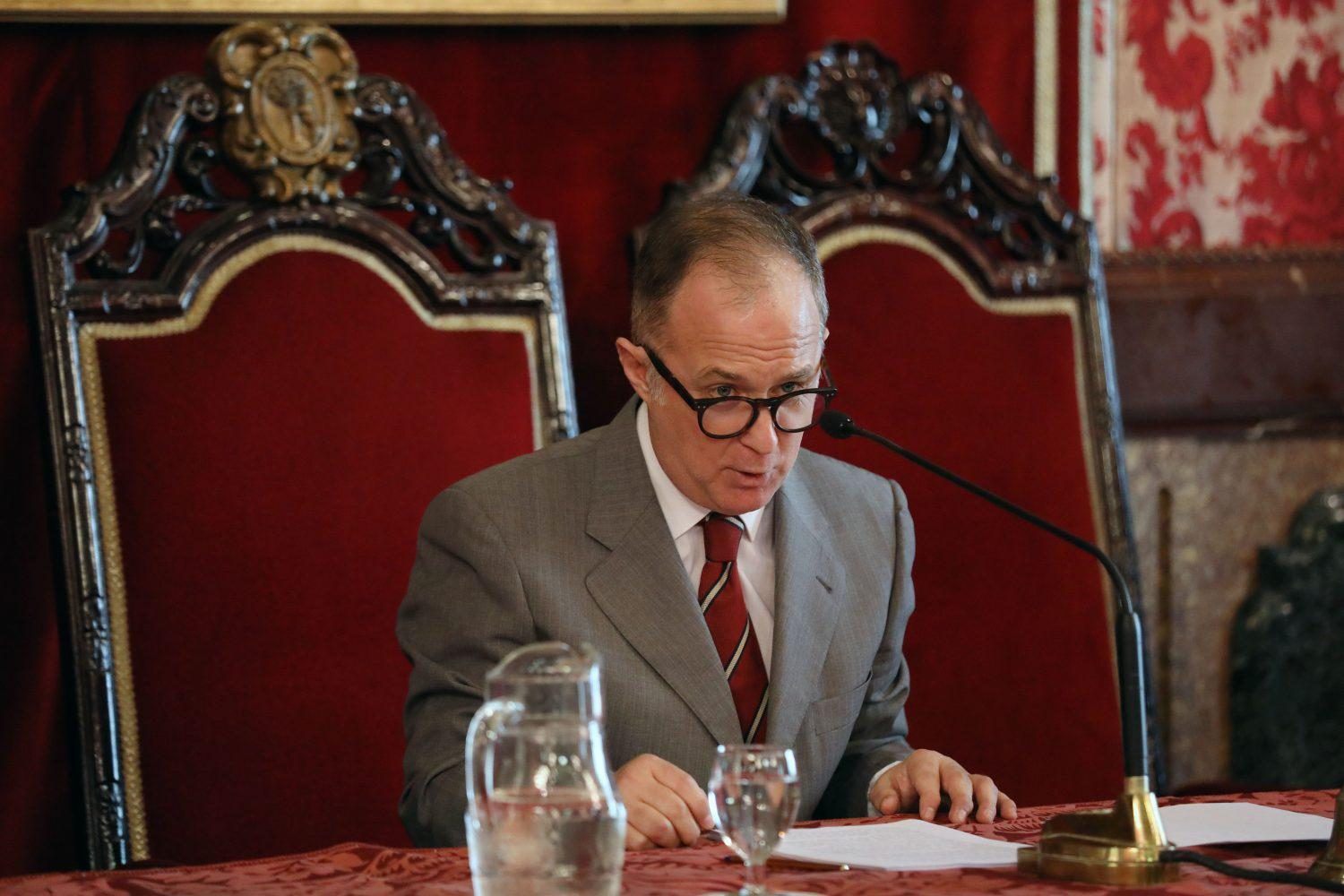
- Born: 1969 (age 56–57); Madrid, Spain
- Occupations: Actor, theatre director, clown
- Spouse: Malena Alterio (m. 2003–2016)

Luis Bermejo Prieto (born 1969) is a Spanish actor and theatre director.

== Biography ==
Luis Bermejo Prieto was born in Madrid in 1969, son to parents from Zarza de Montánchez (province of Cáceres). He received his acting training at Cristina Rota's acting school. Active in stage plays since 1992, he eventually came to found his own theatre company, "Teatro del Zurdo". He made his debut in a feature film in Miguel Bardem's The Ugliest Woman in the World (1999). He earned a nomination to the Goya Award for Best New Actor for his performance in Ángeles González Sinde's One Word from You. He has also featured in films such as Magical Girl, Your Son, and Norberta.

His television credits include performances in Periodistas, Compañeros, Policías, 7 vidas, El comisario, High Seas, Nasdrovia and ANA. all in.

== Accolades ==
Year	Award	Category	Work	Result	Ref.
2009	23rd Goya Awards	Best New Actor	One Word from You	Nominated	
2015	2nd Feroz Awards	Best Actor	Magical Girl	Nominated	
2015	70th CEC Medals	Best Actor	Magical Girl	Nominated	
2015	29th Goya Awards	Best Actor	Magical Girl	Nominated	
2019	28th Actors and Actresses Union Awards	Best Film Actor in a Minor Performance	Your Son	Won	
2024	11th Feroz Awards	Best Supporting Actor in a Film	Un amor	Nominated	
2024	32nd Actors and Actresses Union Awards	Best Film Actor in a Minor Role	Un amor	Nominated	
2024	11th Platino Awards	Best Supporting Actor	Un amor	Nominated	
