= Miguel Ángel Zúñiga =

Spanish handball player (born 1959)

Personal information
- Nationality: Spanish
- Born: 19 October 1959 (age 65)

Sport
- Sport: Handball

Miguel Ángel Zúñiga (born 19 October 1959) is a Spanish handball player. He competed in the men's tournament at the 1988 Summer Olympics.
