= Pepe Viyuela =

Spanish actor

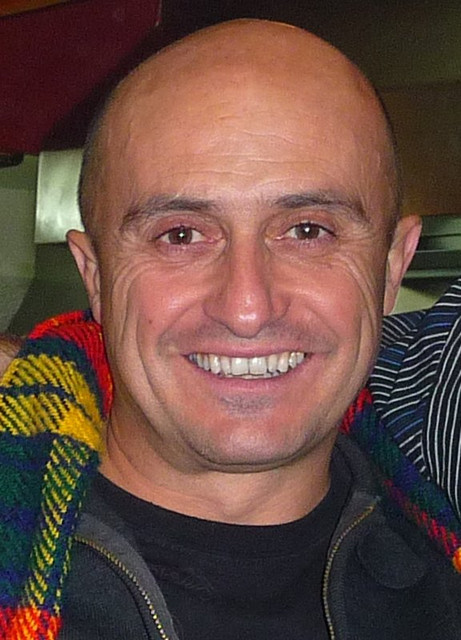
- Viyuela in 2008
- Born: José Viyuela Castillo; 2 June 1963 (age 62); Logroño (La Rioja), Spain

José Viyuela Castillo (born 2 June 1963), known as Pepe Viyuela, is a Spanish actor, clown, poet, and comedian.

== Biography ==
He is best known in English-speaking countries for his one-man stage show Encerrona (Lock-In), which was brought to the London stage in June 2017 as part of the Festival of Spanish Theatre in London (Festelón).

He is known for playing Filemón in La gran aventura de Mortadelo y Filemón (2003) and Mortadelo y Filemón. Misión: salvar la Tierra (2008). In 2003 he published the novel Bestiario del circo: el vientre de la carpa, with a prologue by Andrés Aberasturi. In 2008 he published his second collection of poems named Las letras de tu nombre.

He appeared in the list proposed by the local party Izquierda Independiente ("Independent Left") to the 2023 local elections in San Sebastián de los Reyes. He does not intend to become an active politician, though.

== Selected filmography ==
=== Film ===
Year	Title	Role	Notes
1996	Earth	Ulloa	
1998	The Miracle of P. Tinto	Manikomien Direktor	
2003	Mortadelo & Filemon: The Big Adventure	Filemón	
2004	Di que sí	Salvador Asension	
2004	Escuela de seducción	Víctor	
2008	Mortadelo and Filemon. Mission: Save the Planet	Filemón	
2021	García y García	Javier García	

=== Television ===
Year	Title	Role	Network	Notes
1993, 2004	Un, dos, tres... responda otra vez		Televisión Española	
2005-2014	Aída	José María Martínez ("Chema")	Telecinco	
2015-2016	Olmos y Robles	Sebastián Olmos	Televisión Española	

=== Theatre ===
Year	Title	Theatre	Role	Notes
2016	Mármol (Marble) by Marina Carr	Teatro Valle-Inclán	Art	
2017	Encerrona (Lock-in) by Pepe Viyuela	John Lyon's Theatre, London	Festelón	
