= Mariano Venancio =

Spanish actor

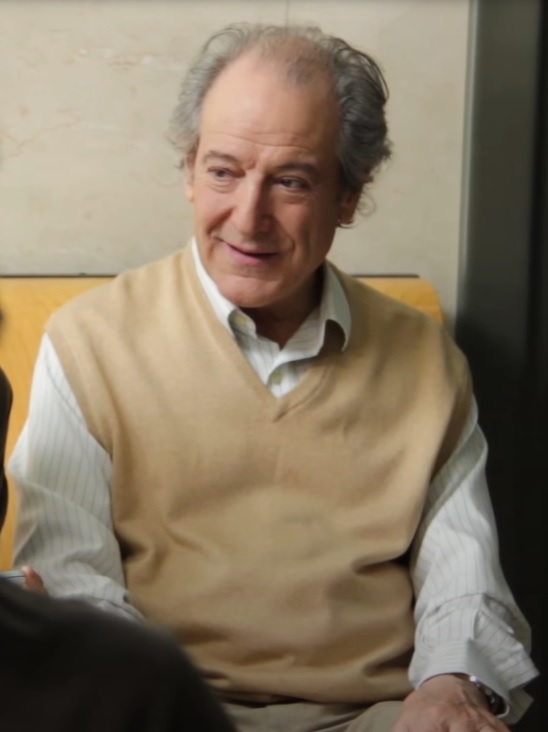
- Born: Mariano Venacio Torralbo; August 31, 1947 (age 78); Salamanca, Spain
- Occupation: Actor

Mariano Venancio Torralbo (born Salamanca, August 31, 1947) is a Spanish stage, television and film actor.

== Biography ==
Mariano Venancio Torralbo was born in Salamanca on August 31, 1947. He studied childhood education (Magisterio) in Salamanca but moved to Madrid to train his acting chops and pursue a career as an actor. While he has worked primarily on stage, he has also featured in film and television works. His television credits include performances in Amar en tiempos revueltos, Cuéntame, Plutón B.R.B. Nero, and De repente, los Gómez. His performance as José (the father of a dying girl, embodying doubt and inability to cope with the death of a loved one), in the 2008 film Camino earned him a Best Film Actor in a Leading Role award at the 18th Actors and Actresses Union Awards.

== Filmography ==
=== Film ===
Year	Title	Role	Notes	Ref
2003	La gran aventura de Mortadelo y Filemón (Mortadelo & Filemon: The Big Adventure)	Superintendente Vicente		
2008	Mortadelo y Filemón. Misión: salvar la Tierra (Mortadelo and Filemon. Mission: Save the Planet)	El Súper		
2008	Camino	José		
2011	23-F: la película	Sabino Fernández Campo		
2014	[•REC]⁴: Apocalipsis (Rec 4: Apocalypse)	Capitán Ortega		

=== Television ===
Year	Title	Role	Notes	Ref
2008	Plutón B.R.B. Nero	Macaulay Culkin III, the President	Main	
2009–10	De repente, los Gómez	Antonio Mariño	Main	
2010	Adolfo Suárez, el presidente	Torcuato Fernández Miranda	TV movie aired as a 2-part miniseries	
2018	Mira lo que has hecho	Julio	Main	
