= Spanish Actors Union =

Professional union that represents actors in Spain

The Spanish Union of Actors and Actresses (Spanish: Unión de Actores y Actrices) is the professional and independent union that represents the interests of the profession in Spain. Most of the film, theater and television actors in Spain are members; it currently has approximately 2,630 affiliates.

Its main functions are to oversee and defend the profession of actors, in order to positively influence the creation of a fairer working society and an autonomous culture.

== History ==
In February 1986 the decision to create the Union of Actors and Actresses was in response to Prime Minister of Spain Felipe González forming a ministerial cabinet committee to review a plan to pass a law that would declare actors responsible as individuals. Actors in the country mobilized against this, and in June they signed the declaration for the creation of the union.

The organization focuses on three areas:

- Standard union action, on behalf of the members, to provide collective bargaining, to support unity of action with other unions, and to monitor the compliance of employers in following laws and regulations pertaining to such things as occupational safety and health and the rights of workers in the workplace.
- Political and institutional action in support of culture and of society.
- The provision of a range of services to its members.

In 1999, the union requested the basic coverage of its artists to match that of the other registered workers in social security.

In 2003, the Union protested against the War in Iraq, with a symbolic award ceremony of peace.

In 2006, the Union protested against the education law in Spain, for marginalizing culture and art for the benefit of the "most pragmatic subjects".

== Awards ==
Another of the objectives of the Union of Actors and Actresses is to promote those works that, in their opinion, deserve to be highlighted, whether they were made for film, television or theatre. To this end, the Spanish Actors Union Awards were created, which recognize the best acting work in each of these three areas.
