= Ana Wagener =

Spanish actress

- Wagener in 2026
- Born: Ana Álvarez Wagener; 25 August 1962 (age 64); Las Palmas, Spain

Ana Álvarez Wagener (born 25 August 1962) is a Spanish actress. She has appeared in such films as The Sleeping Voice, My Prison Yard, Biutiful, and The Invisible Guest. Her television credits include the role of Vicenta Ramírez in La Señora and its successor 14 de abril. La República.

== Life and career ==
Wagener was born in Las Palmas 25 August 1962. She graduated from the Escuela Superior de Arte Dramático de Sevilla. At the age of 18, Alfonso Zurro chose her for a performance in the opera Carmen, signing her up for the theatre company La Jácara in 1982.

She made her feature film debut in 1987 film Los invitados.

Television works include performances in Querido maestro, Compañeros, El comisario and La Señora.

She also works in dubbing since the 1980s, where her work stood out as a director and as an actress, usually dubbing the actress Felicity Huffman.

She featured in 2000 film El Bola. She has since featured in films such as 7 Virgins, Dark Blue Almost Black, Take the Sky, My Prison Yard, Biutiful and The Sleeping Voice. These last three films have earned her nominations for the Goya Awards, and she received an award in 2011 for The Sleeping Voice.

== Filmography ==
=== Films ===
Key
†	Denotes films that have not yet been released

Year	Title	Role	Notes	Ref.
2000	El Bola (Pellet)	Laura		
2003	Las voces de la noche (Voices in the Night)	Bárbara		
2004	Horas de luz (Hours of Light)	Chus		
2006	Azuloscurocasinegro (Dark Blue Almost Black)	Ana		
2006	Cabeza de perro (Doghead)	Rosa		
2008	El patio de mi cárcel (My Prison Yard)	Dolores		
2010	Biutiful	Bea		
2010	Secuestrados (Kidnapped)	Marta		
2011	La voz dormida (The Sleeping Voice)	Mercedes		
2015	Vulcania	Aurora		
2016	Contratiempo (The Invisible Guest)	Virginia Goodman		
2018	El reino (The Realm)	Asunción Ceballos, "La Ceballos"		
2018	Durante la tormenta (Mirage)	Inspectora Dimas		
2020	Ofrenda a la tormenta (Offering to the Storm)	Fina Hidalgo		
2022	Las niñas de cristal (Dancing on Glass)	Rosa		
2023	Te estoy amando locamente (Love & Revolution)	Reme		
2026	Morir no siempre sale bien (To Die Is Not Always Good Business)	Inés		
2026	Una familia (A Family)	Consuelo		
2026	En nombre de otro † (Proxies)			
