= La Señora =

- Genre: Period drama
- Country of origin: Spain
- Original language: Spanish
- No. of seasons: 3
- No. of episodes: 39

Production
- Running time: 75 minutes
- Production company: Diagonal TV for Televisión Española

Original release
- Network: La 1
- Release: March 6, 2008 – January 18, 2010

Related
- 14 de abril. La República

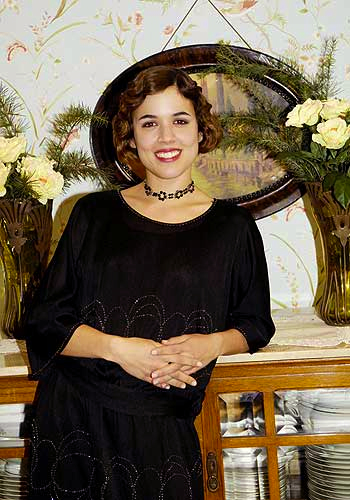
Spanish actress Adriana Ugarte in the role of the protagonist of the series La Señora

La Señora (English: The Lady) is a Spanish television period drama series set in the 1920s, produced by Diagonal TV for Televisión Española, that was broadcast on La 1 of Televisión Española from 2008 to 2010.

It was filmed in Asturias, Sepúlveda and Navalcarnero, and viewership exceeded 5 million by the last episode which aired on January 18, 2010.

== Plot ==
In the 1920s Victoria and Ángel fall in love in a small town, northern Spain. They are two people both from a different social class, she is the daughter of a wealthy businessman and he comes from a poor family. They are so in love but social norms and circumstances of the era force them to break up. Several years later, they meet again, Victoria as a powerful businesswoman and Ángel as a priest.

== Spin-offs and adaptations ==
In 2011, Televisión Española created another popular series as a spin-off, 14 de abril. La República (English: April 14, The Republic), which included some of the original characters from La Señora.

== International broadcasting ==
- Vietnam - The series premiered on January 14, 2023, on VTV1 as Quý bà.
