= Carme Elías =

Spanish actress

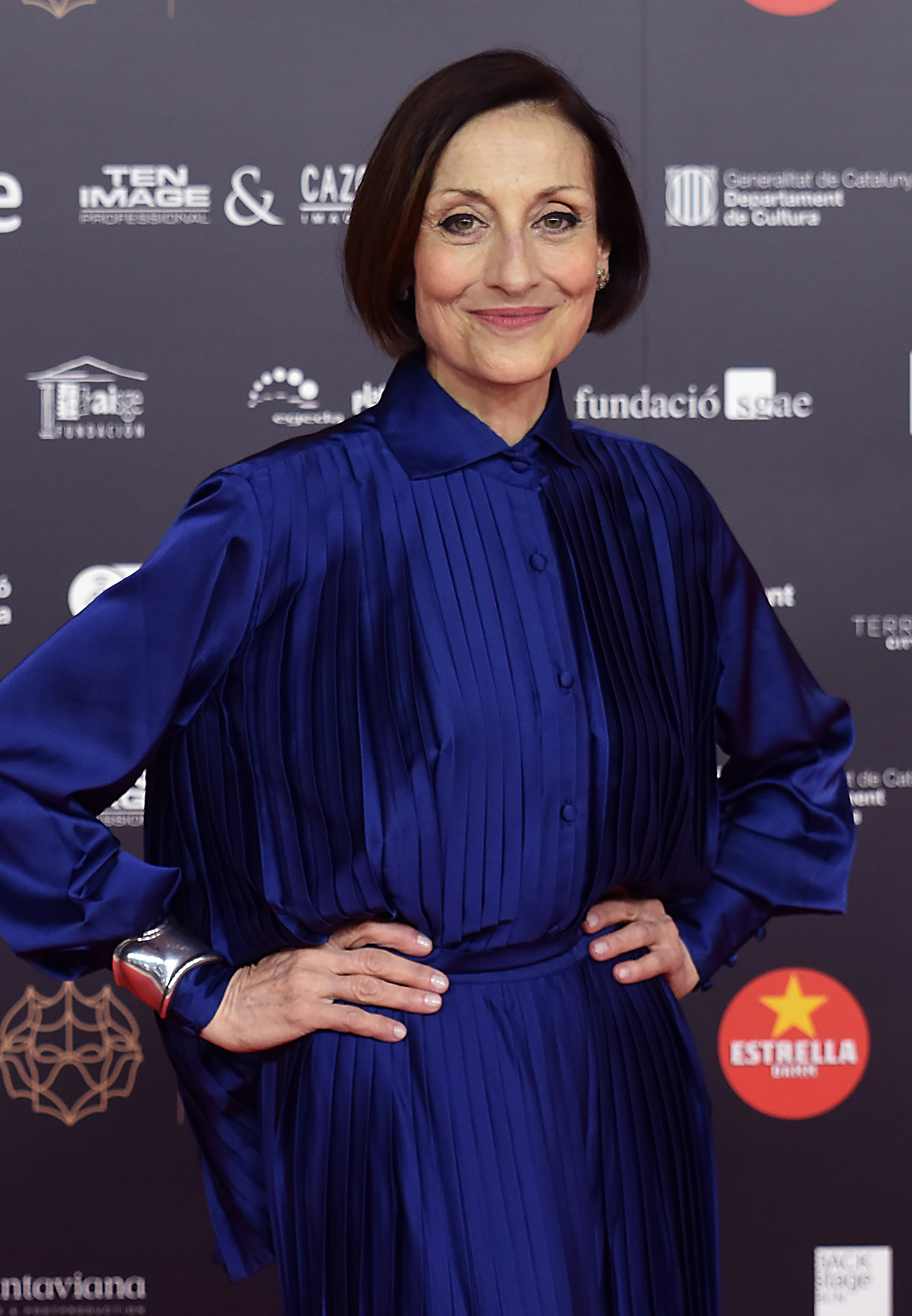
- Elías in 2021
- Born: Carmen Elías i Boada; 14 January 1951 (age 75); Barcelona, Spain
- Other names: Carmen Elías; Carme Elias
- Years active: 1975–present

Carme Elías i Boada (born 14 January 1951) is a Spanish film, television, and stage actress. She won the Goya Award for Best Actress for her performance in Camino.

== Life ==
Carme Elías i Boada was born on 14 January 1951 in Barcelona. In 2022, she disclosed that she was in an early stage of Alzheimer's disease and that she was leaving her career, with the exception of a documentary film tracking the development of her condition.

== Selected filmography ==
Year	Title	Role	Notes	Ref.
1985	Stico			
1991	Capità Escalaborns	Catalina		
1991	El rey pasmado (The Dumbfounded King)	Abadesa ('abbess')		
1993	Los de enfrente (The Window Over the Way)	Nejla		
1994	Los peores años de nuestra vida (The Window Over the Way)	Carola		
1995	La flor de mi secreto (The Flower of My Secret)	Betty		
1996	Menos que cero	Maite		
1996	Pesadilla para un rico	Alicia		
1996	La vida privada	Lola		
1997	En brazos de la mujer madura (In Praise of Older Women)	Irene		
1998	Agujetas en el alma	Carmen		
1999	Manos de seda	Silvia		
1999	No respires. El amor está en el aire	Julia		
2006	Los aires difíciles (Rough Winds)	Sara		
2008	Camino	Gloria		
2013	La distancia más larga (The Longest Distance)	Martina		
2018	Quién te cantará	Blanca		
2021	Las consecuencias (The Consequences)	Teresa		

== Bibliography ==
- Benavent, Francisco María (2000). Cine español de los 90. Diccionario de películas, directores y temático. Bilbao: Ediciones Mensajero. ISBN 84-271-2326-4.
