= Gloria Ramos (actress) =

Spanish actress (born 1993)

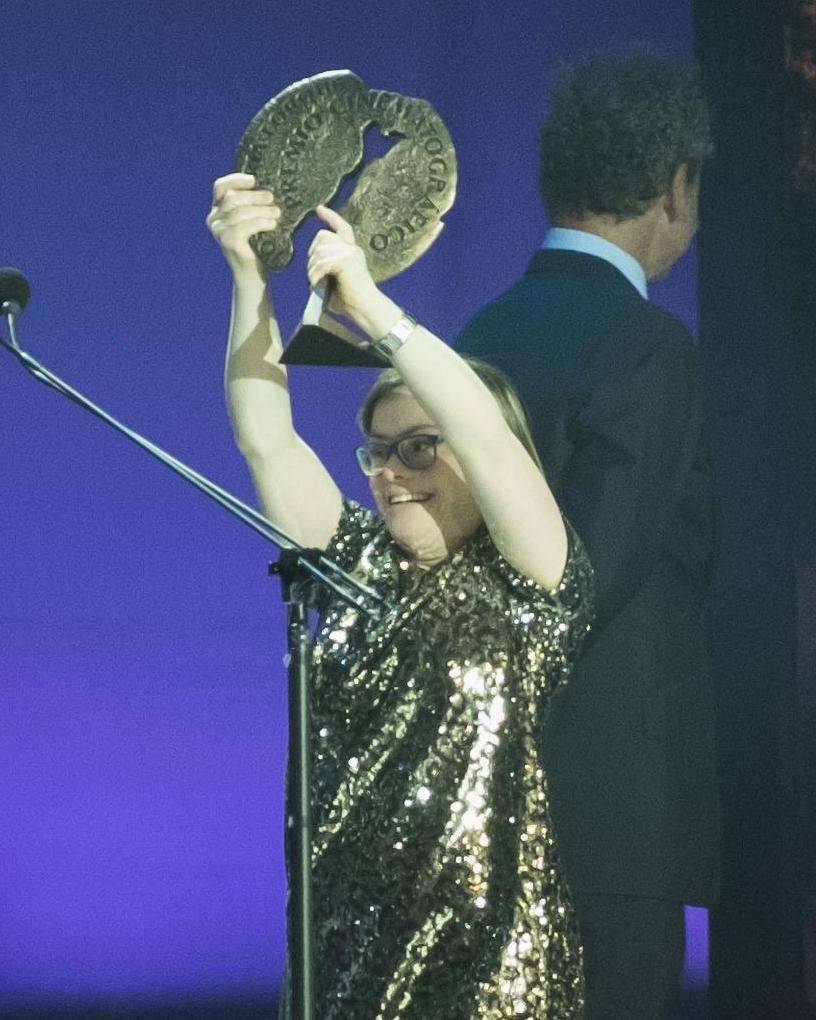
- Gloria Ramos in 2019
- Born: Gloria Ramos; 1993 (age 32–33); Madrid, Spain
- Occupation: Actress
- Years active: 2018–present
- Notable work: Champions

Gloria Ramos (born 1993) is a Spanish actress. She made history as the first actress with intellectual disability to be nominated for a Goya Award for Best New Actress for her role as Collantes in the 2018 film Champions directed by Javier Fesser. The film's success, which attracted over 3.3 million viewers and won the Goya Award for Best Film, brought Ramos international recognition and established her as a pioneering figure in disability representation in Spanish cinema.

Ramos has since appeared in several television series, including La que se avecina and Merlí: Sapere Aude, as well as in theater productions. She continues to work as an advocate for disability inclusion in the entertainment industry while pursuing her acting career.

== Early life ==
Gloria Ramos was born in 1993 in Madrid, Spain. She has Down syndrome, a genetic condition that causes intellectual disability.

Ramos pursued her education alongside her artistic interests, eventually earning a diploma in Early Childhood Education from the Pontifical University of Comillas. She has also demonstrated athletic abilities, participating in sports such as archery and football.

== Career ==
=== Breakthrough with Champions (2018) ===
Ramos's breakthrough came in 2017 when director Javier Fesser selected her for a role in his film Champions (Spanish: Campeones). In the film, she portrayed Collantes, a strong-willed basketball player with intellectual disability who is part of a team coached by a former professional basketball coach performing community service. Ramos was the only female actor among the nine actors with intellectual disabilities who starred in the film.

The character of Collantes was described as having a tough, rebellious personality, quite different from Ramos's own demeanor. Her performance was noted for its authenticity and humor, particularly in scenes where her character's determination and spirit shine through despite the challenges faced by the team.

Champions became a major commercial and critical success, grossing over €19 million and attracting 3.3 million viewers, making it the highest-grossing Spanish-language film of 2018 in Spain. The film was selected as Spain's entry for the Academy Award for Best Foreign Language Film at the 91st Academy Awards, though it was not nominated.

=== Goya Award nomination ===
For her performance in Champions, Ramos received a nomination for the Goya Award for Best New Actress at the 33rd Goya Awards in 2019. This nomination made her the first actress with intellectual disability to be nominated for a Goya Award, marking a historic moment in Spanish cinema. While she did not win the award, her nomination was widely celebrated as a significant step forward for disability representation in film.

The film itself won the Goya Award for Best Film, and her co-star Jesús Vidal won the Goya Award for Best New Actor, making Champions one of the most successful Spanish films of the year.

=== Television and continued work ===
Following the success of Champions, Ramos expanded her career into television. She appeared in the popular Spanish sitcom La que se avecina and had a recurring role as Laura in the series Merlí: Sapere Aude (2019-2021), a spin-off of the Catalan series Merlí.

In 2020, she appeared in Historias lamentables, another film directed by Javier Fesser. She also participated in the documentary Ni distintos, ni diferentes. Campeones (Neither Different nor Distinct: Champions), which explored the real stories behind the characters in Champions.

In 2023, Ramos reprised her role in Championext (Spanish: Campeonex), the sequel to Champions. She has also been active in theater, participating in stage adaptations and touring productions related to the Champions franchise, including "Campeones de la Comedia" (Champions of Comedy).

=== Other work ===
Beyond acting, Ramos works in retail at a sports store on Madrid's Gran Vía while continuing to pursue acting opportunities. She has become an advocate for disability inclusion and representation in the entertainment industry, using her platform to promote awareness and understanding of intellectual disabilities.

During the COVID-19 pandemic, she took online singing lessons, expressing her interest in potentially pursuing musical theater in the future.

== Personal life ==
Ramos lives with her family in Madrid and maintains close relationships with her parents and siblings. She has spoken about her desire for independence and has expressed interest in eventually living on her own or with friends. She enjoys various activities including riding motorcycles with her brother and using social media platforms like TikTok.

In interviews, Ramos has been vocal about challenging stereotypes surrounding intellectual disabilities, emphasizing that people with Down syndrome can achieve their goals with proper support and opportunities. She has stated that her dream is to perform in a musical and continue expanding her acting career into different genres, including drama and action films.

== Impact and legacy ==
Gloria Ramos's nomination for the Goya Award has been regarded a significant moment for disability representation in Spanish cinema. According to the commentators her success has opened doors for other actors with disabilities and has contributed to changing perceptions about the capabilities of people with intellectual disabilities in the entertainment industry.

Her work has been recognized not only for its artistic merit but also for its social impact, helping to promote inclusion and diversity in Spanish film and television. Ramos continues to be an inspiration for young people with disabilities who aspire to careers in the performing arts.

== Filmography ==
=== Film ===
Year	Title	Role	Notes
2018	Champions	Collantes	Nominated – Goya Award for Best New Actress
2018	Ni distintos, ni diferentes. Campeones	Herself	Documentary
2020	Historias lamentables		
2023	Championext	Collantes	Sequel to Champions
TBA	La reina del convento	Sor Lola	

=== Television ===
Year	Title	Role	Notes
2019–2021	Merlí: Sapere Aude	Laura	Recurring role
TBA	La que se avecina		Guest appearance

== Awards and nominations ==
Year	Award	Category	Work	Result
2019	Goya Awards	Best New Actress	Champions	Nominated
2019	CEC Awards	Best New Actress	Champions	Nominated

== See also ==
- List of people with Down syndrome
