= Weil wir Champions sind =

2022 German television film

- Film poster
- Based on: Champions by Javier Fesser
- Screenplay by: Andreas Fuhrmann; Oliver Philipp
- Directed by: Christoph Schnee
- Starring: Wotan Wilke Möhring
- Music by: Frederik Wiedmann
- Country of origin: Germany
- Original language: German

Production
- Executive producer: Oliver Berben
- Producer: Nina Viktoria Philipp
- Cinematography: Armin Golisano
- Editor: Günter Schultens
- Running time: 93 minutes
- Production company: Constantin Television GmbH

Original release
- Network: RTL+
- Release: 5 April 2022

Weil wir Champions sind (lit. 'Because We Are Champions') is a 2022 German sports comedy-drama television film directed by Christoph Schnee and written by Andreas Fuhrmann and Oliver Philipp. It is a German-language remake of the 2018 Spanish film Champions. Starring Wotan Wilke Möhring accompanied by Katharina Schüttler, Ben Münchow, Ursula Werner and Sabine Vitua while Antonia Riet, Tanino Camilleri, Luca Davidhaimann, Christian Forst, Nico Michels, Jonas Relitzki, Jochen Riemer, Simon Rupp and Matthias Sander make their debut as actors.

== Synopsis ==
Things are not going well for basketball coach Andreas: work leaves, wife leaves, and then he is caught driving across town in search of alcohol. The consequence? community hours. From now on, Andreas will coach a basketball team with players with mental disabilities. A real challenge for the successful Bundesliga coach. Although a second look is always worth it and happiness is also a matter of perspective.

== Cast ==
The actors participating in this film are:

- Wotan Wilke Möhring as Andreas Ellguth
- Ben Münchow as Daniel Ellguth
- Katharina Schüttler as Pia Thomann
- Ursula Werner as Katrin Hepp
- Matthias Sander as Waldemar Litwinow
- Jonas Relitzki as Rudi Cölle
- Jochen Riemer as Michael Hellmich
- Simon Rupp as Matze Brauns
- Nico Michels as Ulli Gericke
- Luca Davidhaimann as Gregor Scherzinger
- Tanino Camilleri as Tino Bierwald
- Christian Forst as Manuel Horch
- Antonia Riet as Maya Krawczyk
- Sabine Vitua as Judge
- Enno Kalisch as Rochus Scherzinger

== Production ==
Principal photography started in June 2021 in and around the Telekom Dome, Bonn.

== Release ==
It premiered on 5 April 2022, on the RTL+ pay channel. Its premiere on a public television channel took place on 25 May 2022, on VOX.

== Accolades ==
Year	Award	Category	Recipient	Result	Ref.
2022	German Television Academy Awards	Best Casting	Iris Baumüller	Nominated	
