= Elisa Hipólito =

Spanish actress (born 2002)

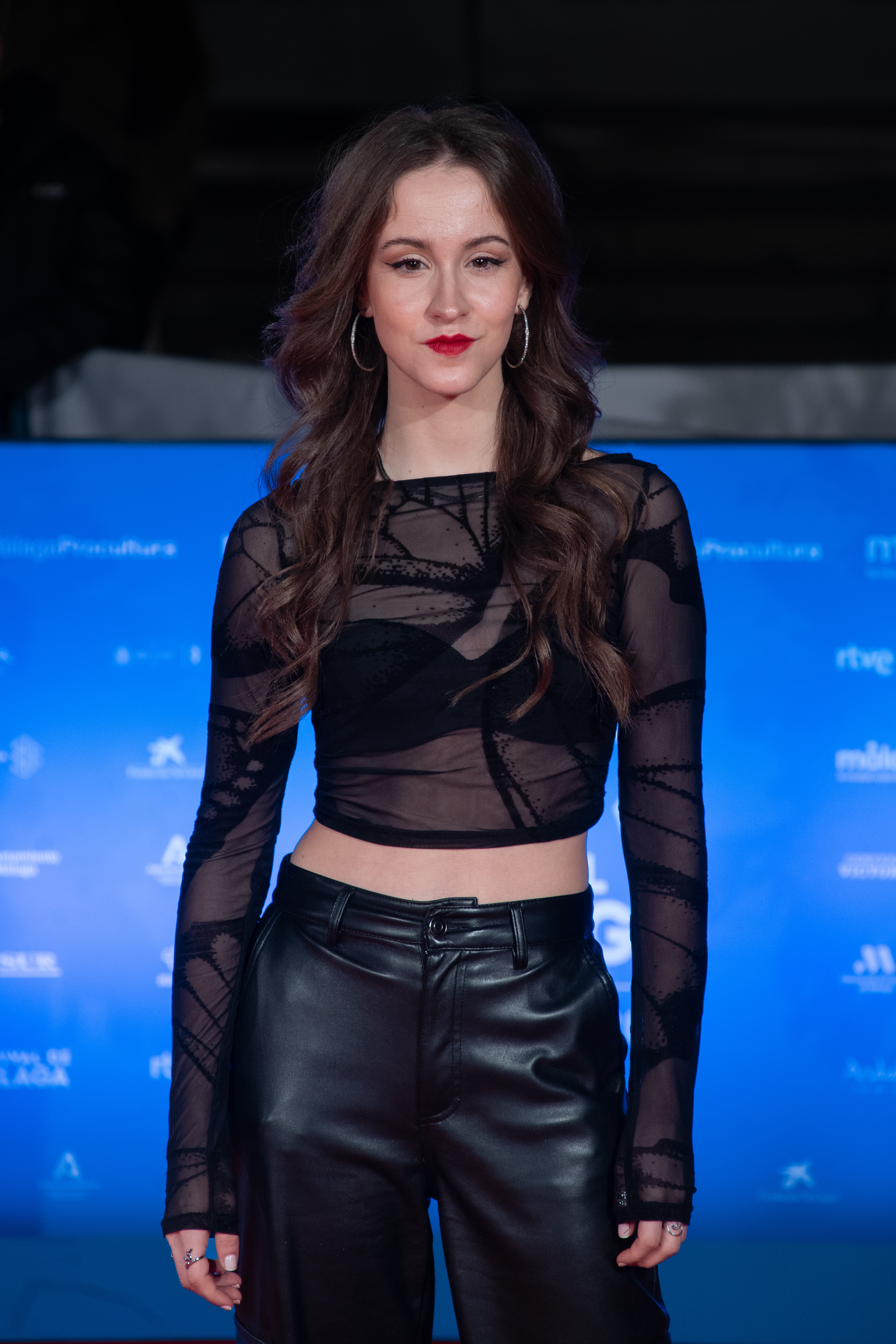
- Hipólito in 2024
- Born: Elisa Hipólito Sagaesta; 11 April 2002 (age 22); Madrid, Spain
- Occupation(s): Actress, dancer, singer
- Father: Carlos Hipólito

Elisa Hipólito Sagaseta (born 11 April 2002) is a Spanish singer, dancer, and actress.

== Biography ==
She was born on 11 April 2002 in Madrid, the daughter of Carlos Hipólito, a Spanish actor, and Mapi Sagaseta, a Spanish actress. She studied classical dance, Spanish dance and contemporary dance at Escuela de Danza del Colegio Zola Villafranca, while studying German and English languages. In 2012 she began her career and she made a performance in Sonrisas y lágrimas at Teatro Coliseum (Gran Vía, Madrid), Grease and Billy Elliot (2017), being nominated in 2022 to Best Supporting Stage Actress at the 30th Actors and Actresses Union Awards. She played Cecilia, the coach, in Campeonex (2023), by Javier Fesser, replacing Javier Gutiérrez in the previous film. She also appeared in the television series Vota Juan (2019), in the short film Cardelinas (2020), and in the videoclip Volcánica (2019) by Pepa Lucas.
