= Álvaro Longoria =

Spanish film director

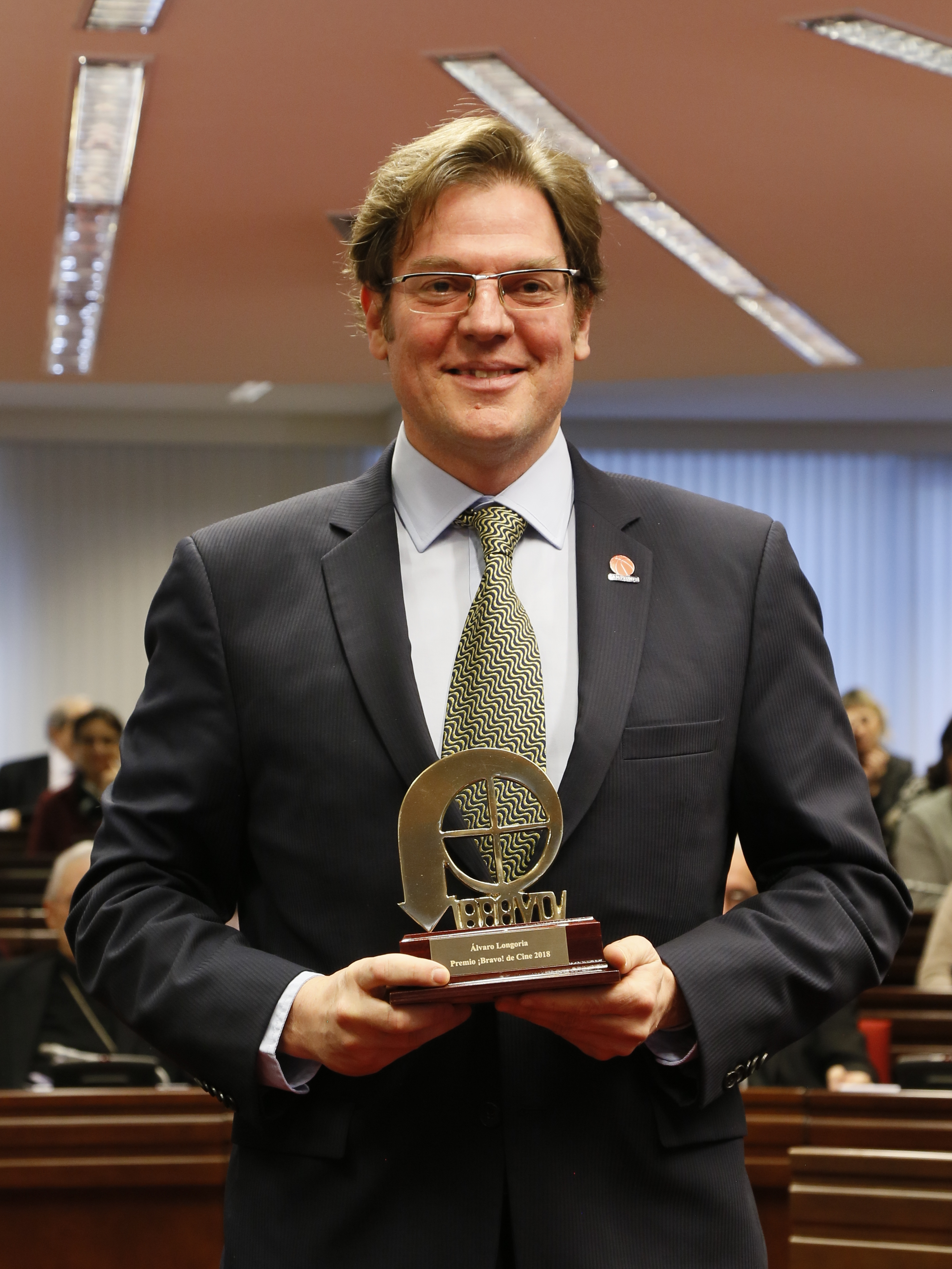
Álvaro Longoria in 2019

Álvaro Longoria (born 1968 in Santander, Cantabria, Spain) is a film director, executive producer, and actor. He produces indie films for several distributors including Cinema Libre and Morena Films. He is perhaps best known for producing the film Everybody Knows directed by Asghar Farhadi and Che starring Benicio Del Toro and directed by Steven Soderbergh as well as Looking for Fidel directed by Oliver Stone. He won a Goya Award for Best Documentary Film for Hijos de las Nubes, a story about the decolonization of the Sahara region of western Africa, starring Javier Bardem. He received the Cinema for Peace International Green Film Award in 2020 for his film Sanctuary, and the Award for Justice in 2019.

== Filmography ==
=== Film ===
Year	Title	Role
2000	One of the Hollywood Ten	Executive producer
2001	Fish People	Producer
2002	Cuatro puntos cardinales	Executive producer
2006	El carnaval de Sodoma	Co-producer
2007	La zona	Producer
2008	Che: Part One	Executive producer
2008	Che: Part Two	Executive producer
2009	Daniel and Ana	Executive producer
2009	I Come with the Rain	Executive producer
2010	Room in Rome	Producer, Executive producer
2011	The Monk	Executive producer
2012	7 días en La Habana	Producer
2012	Asterix & Obelix: God Save Britain	Co-producer
2013	Scorpion in Love	Producer
2015	Ma Ma	Producer
2016	Altamira	Producer
2016	Vernon Walks	Producer; Short film
2018	Campeones	Producer
2018	Everybody Knows	Producer
2020	Historias Lamentables	Producer
2021	Poliamor para principiantes	Producer, executive producer
2021	Cuidado con lo que deseas	Producer; Also concept developer
2022	En Los Margenes	Producer
2023	Champions	Executive producer Remake of his 2018 produced film "Campeones"
2023	Campeonex	Producer, executive producer
2024	Ellipsis	Producer
2025	8	Producer

=== Documentary ===
Year	Title	Director	Producer	Writer	Notes
2012	Hijos de las Nubes: La Última Colonia	Yes	Yes	Yes	
2015	The Propaganda Game	Yes	Yes	Yes	
2016	Esperanza	Yes	Yes	No	Short film
2018	Two Catalonias	Yes	Yes	Yes	Co-directed with Gerardo Olivares
2018	Ni distintos ni diferentes: Campeones	Yes	Yes	No	Documentary about the disabled actors of his produced film Campeones
2019	Santuario	Yes	Yes	Yes	Also camera operator
2022	Tequila, Sexo y Rock & Roll	Yes	Yes	Yes	
2023	La vida de Brianeitor	Yes	Yes	Yes	
2025	The Sleeper. El Caravaggio perdido	Yes	Yes	Yes	The film structured like a thriller is about the piece of art, titled "Ecce homo."

==== Producer only ====
Year	Title	Role
2001	Portman, a la sombra de Roberto	Executive producer
2001	Chavela	Co-producer
2002	Cuatro Puntos Cardinales	Executive producer
2003	Comandante	Executive producer
2003	Caballé, más allá de la música	Producer
2005	Iberia	Producer
2009	Últimos testigos	Producer
2017	El Maestro de Altamira	Producer
2018	El Guardián de la Cueva	Producer
2018	Renzo Piano, an Architect for Santander	Producer
2018	Altamira, el origen del arte	Producer

==== Making-offs ====
Year	Title	Director	Camera operator
2010	Room in Rome	Yes	No
2013	Scorpion in Love	Yes	No
2021	Poliamor para principiantes	Yes	Yes
2021	Cuidado con lo que deseas	Yes	Yes

=== Television ===
Year	Title	Creator	Executive Producer	Notes
2000	Queen of Swords	No	Yes	TV series
2003-2004	America Undercover	No	Yes	TV documentary series
2020	Diarios de la Cuarentena	Yes	Yes	TV Miniseries
2020	Relatos Con-fin-a-dos	Yes	Yes	TV Anthology series
