= Gomaespuma =

Gomaespuma was a Spanish radio show, hosted for 15 years by Juan Luis Cano and Guillermo Fesser. The program was cast through the years in several nationwide networks of Spain. It began in Antena 3 Radio in May 1992. It became one of the most popular morning shows in the 90's on M-80 Radio and it saw the last days in Onda Cero Radio in July 2007, when the last program was broadcast.

Gomaespuma organises the "Flamenco pa tos" festival, the most important Flamenco festival in Spain and also directs a foundation of the same name. The festival's proceeds help children in need in Managua.

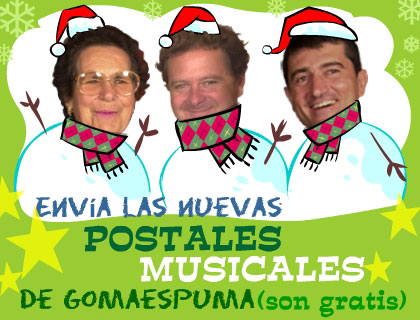
Cándida Villar, Juan Luis Cano (center) and Guillermo Fesser in a Christmas card

== Presenters ==
- Pay attention to the pedals: Luis Montoro
- Cinema: Cándida Villar
- Corresponsal en Paris: Rubén Amón
- Corresponsal USA: Gina Fox
- Mister García: Claro García
- Interviews: Juan Luis y Guillermo
- "Flamenco pa' tos": José Manuel Gamboa y Juan Verdú
- The guide of the "Michelines": Juan Carlos Orlando
- The B face: Carlos Cano
- The musical "croqueta": Santi Alcanda
- The woman that I love: Curra Fernández
- Books: Mar de Tejeda
- News: Esmeralda Velasco
- Gomaespuma with: José Manuel Lapeña
- Gomaespumino: Juan Luis and Guillermo
- Health for the biggest: Alfonso del Álamo

=== Other Shows ===
- Cooking with Josechu Letón
- Gomaespuma of Success
- Military Gomaespuma
- Regional Gomaespuma
- "Supernotición que te cagas"

== Characters ==
These characters appeared on television and radio (marionettes). Most of these names contain puns, e.g. "Chema Pamundi" ("Chema" is colloquial for name "José María") sounds like "mapamundi" ("World map").

- Armando Adistancia
- Borja Món de York
- Candida
- Chema Pamundi
- Don Eusebio
- Don Francisco Rupto
- Don Gun
- Don Jesús Tituto
- El niño del paquete
- Estela Gartija
- Gustavo de Básica
- Padre Palomino
- Peláez

== Books ==
- 20 Years With Gomaespuma
- There is Not More Family Than One Family
- Great Misfortunes of the History of Spain
- The Father Says No
- The "Michelines" guide
- When God Presses, He Drowns a Lot (Guillermo Fesser)
- Hincaíto (Juan Luis Cano)
- The Legs are Not of the Body (Juan Luis Cano)
- Trades Guide of Gomaespuma (Guillermo Fesser, Juan Luis Cano and Jose Manuel Lapeña)
- A Bullfighter's Pass (Juan Luis Cano y Ruben Amón)
