= Ni distintos ni diferentes: Campeones =

- Theatrical release poster
- Directed by: Álvaro Longoria
- Produced by: Luis Manso; Lucrecía Botín; Álvaro Longoria; Javier Fesser
- Starring: Jesús Vidal; Stefan López; Roberto Chinchilla; Gloria Ramos; Jesús Lago; Julio Fernández; Fran Fuentes; Alberto Nieto Fernández; Sergio Olmo
- Edited by: Javi Frutos
- Music by: Roberto Eugenio Gonzalez
- Production companies: Morena Films; Películas Pendelton
- Distributed by: Universal Pictures International Spain
- Release dates: September 28, 2018 (SSIFF); November 16, 2018 (Spain)
- Running time: 87 minutes
- Country: Spain
- Language: Spanish
- Box office: $21,456

Ni distintos ni diferentes: Campeones (lit. 'Neither different nor different: Champions') is a 2018 Spanish documentary film directed and co-produced by Álvaro Longoria. The film tells the true story behind the leading cast of the 2018 film Champions directed by Javier Fesser.

== Synopsis ==
The nine protagonists of the 2018 film Champions who have intellectual disabilities open the door of their lives and tell us first-hand about the challenges of living in a society that is not designed for them.

== Cast ==
- Jesús Vidal as Himself
- Stefan López as Himself
- Roberto Chinchilla as Himself
- Gloria Ramos as Herself
- Jesús Lago as Himself
- Julio Fernández as Himself
- Fran Fuentes as Himself
- Alberto Nieto Fernández as Himself
- Sergio Olmo as Himself

== Release ==
It had its world premiere on September 28, 2018, at the San Sebastian International Film Festival. It was commercially released on November 16, 2018, in Spanish theaters.
