= Goya Award for Best New Actor =

Annual award by the Spanish Film Academy

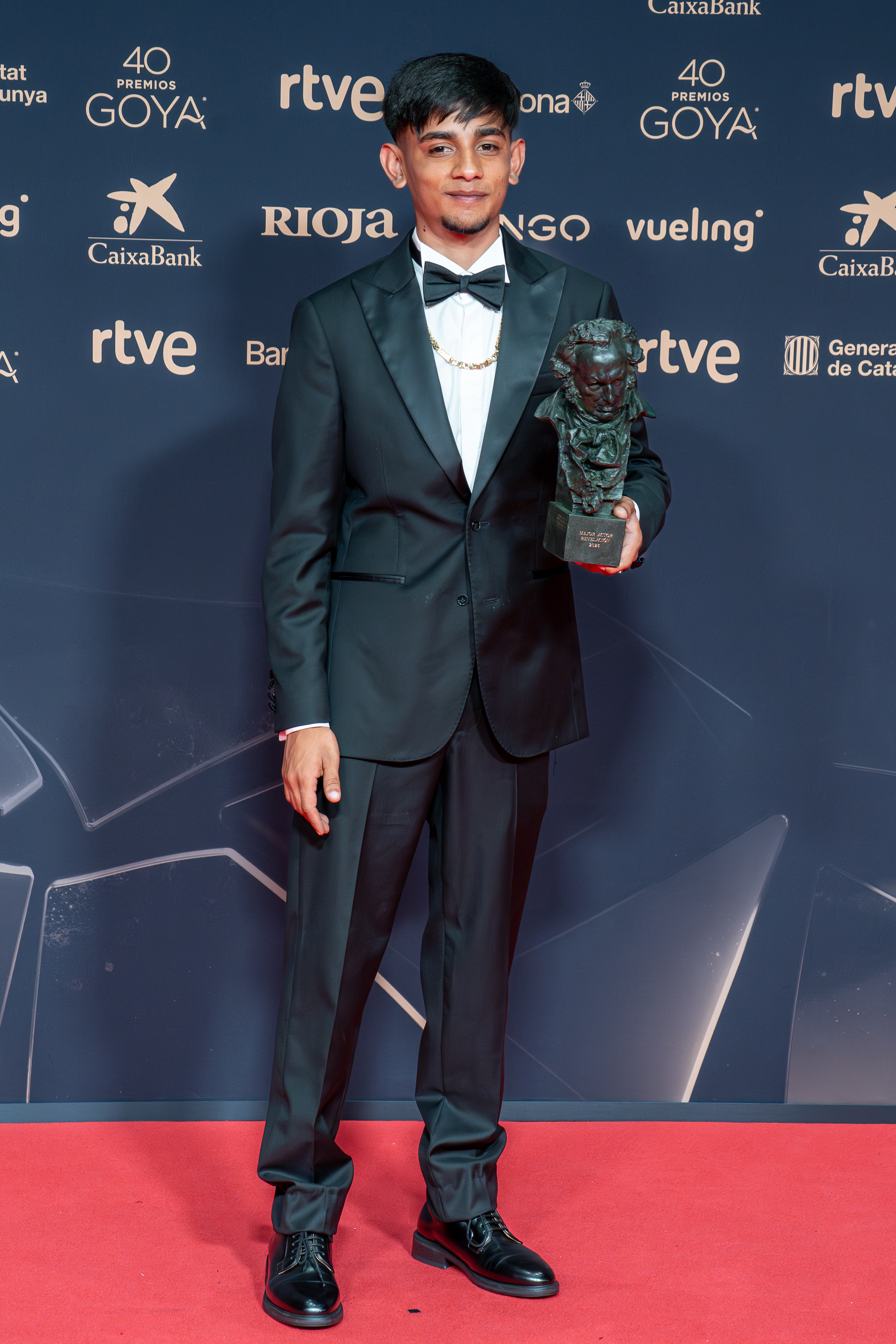
- The 2026 winner: Antonio Fernández Gabarre
- Native name: Premio Goya al mejor actor revelación
- Awarded for: Best performance by a debuting actor in a Spanish film of the year
- Country: Spain
- Presented by: Academy of Cinematographic Arts and Sciences of Spain (AACCE)
- First award: 9th Goya Awards (1994)
- Most recent winner: Antonio Fernández Gabarre; Sleepless City (2025)
- Website: Official website

The Goya Award for Best New Actor (Spanish: Premio Goya al mejor actor revelación) is one of the Goya Awards presented annually by the Academy of Cinematographic Arts and Sciences of Spain (AACCE) since the 9th edition of the awards in 1994. It is given in honor of an actor, in one of their first prominent film roles, who has delivered an outstanding leading or supporting performance in a Spanish film.

== History ==
The category was first presented at the ninth edition of the Goya Awards, with Saturnino García being the first winner for his performance as Justino in Justino, un asesino de la tercera edad.

Multiple winners and nominees in the category have gone on to win or be nominated for the other two male performance categories at the Goya Awards (Best Actor and Best Supporting Actor). Namely, nominees Javier Cámara, Eduard Fernández, Luis Tosar, and David Verdaguer, have all won both Best Actor and Best Supporting Actor. Additionally, 1996 winner Santiago Segura won Best New Director three years later for Torrente, the Dumb Arm of the Law.

For the 39th ceremony, the Academy of Cinematographic Arts and Sciences of Spain introduced a modification consisting of the requirement of an authorization signed by the actor accepting his participation in the Goya Awards". For the 41st ceremony, new regulations were established, setting as a requirement that candidates must not have appeared in more than four feature films released in commercial theaters as a supporting actor, and that they must not have worked professionally as a film actor for more than 10 years.

As of the 2026 ceremony, Antonio Fernández Gabarre is the most recent winner in this category for his role as Toni in Sleepless City.

== Winners and nominees ==
In the list below the winner of the award for each year is shown first, followed by the other nominees.

Table key
‡	Indicates the winner

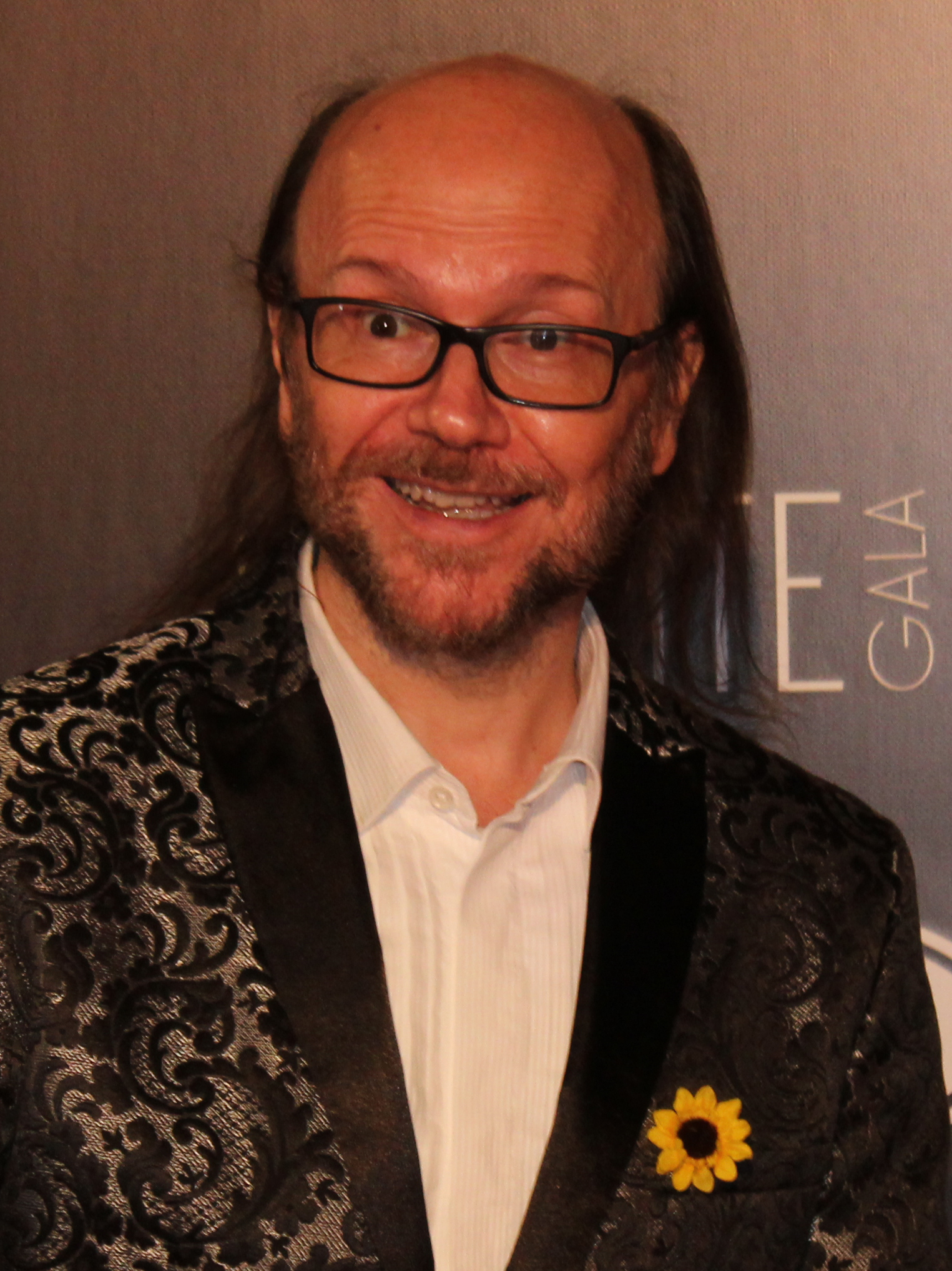
Santiago Segura won for The Day of the Beast in 1995.

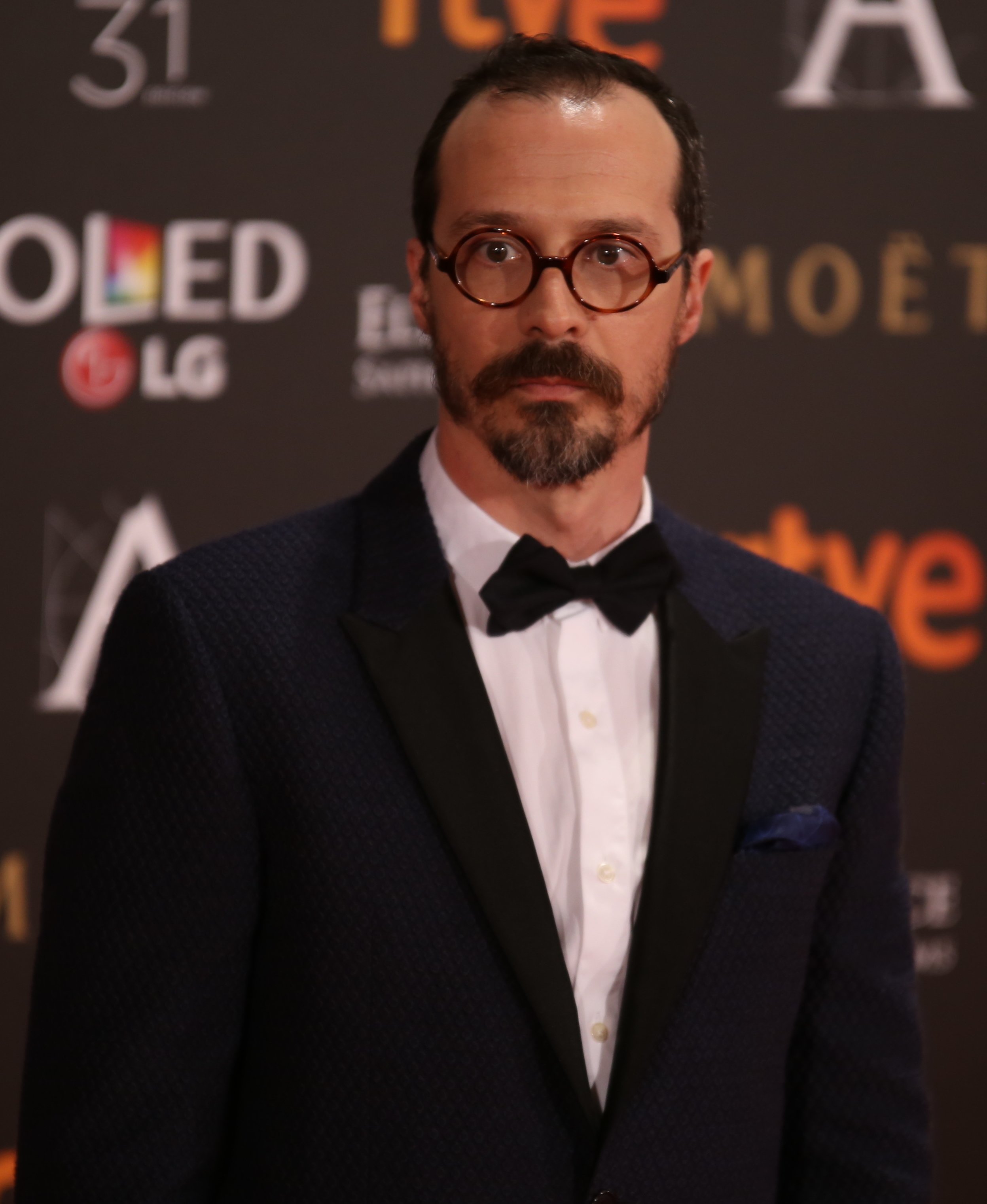
Fele Martínez won for Tesis in 1996.

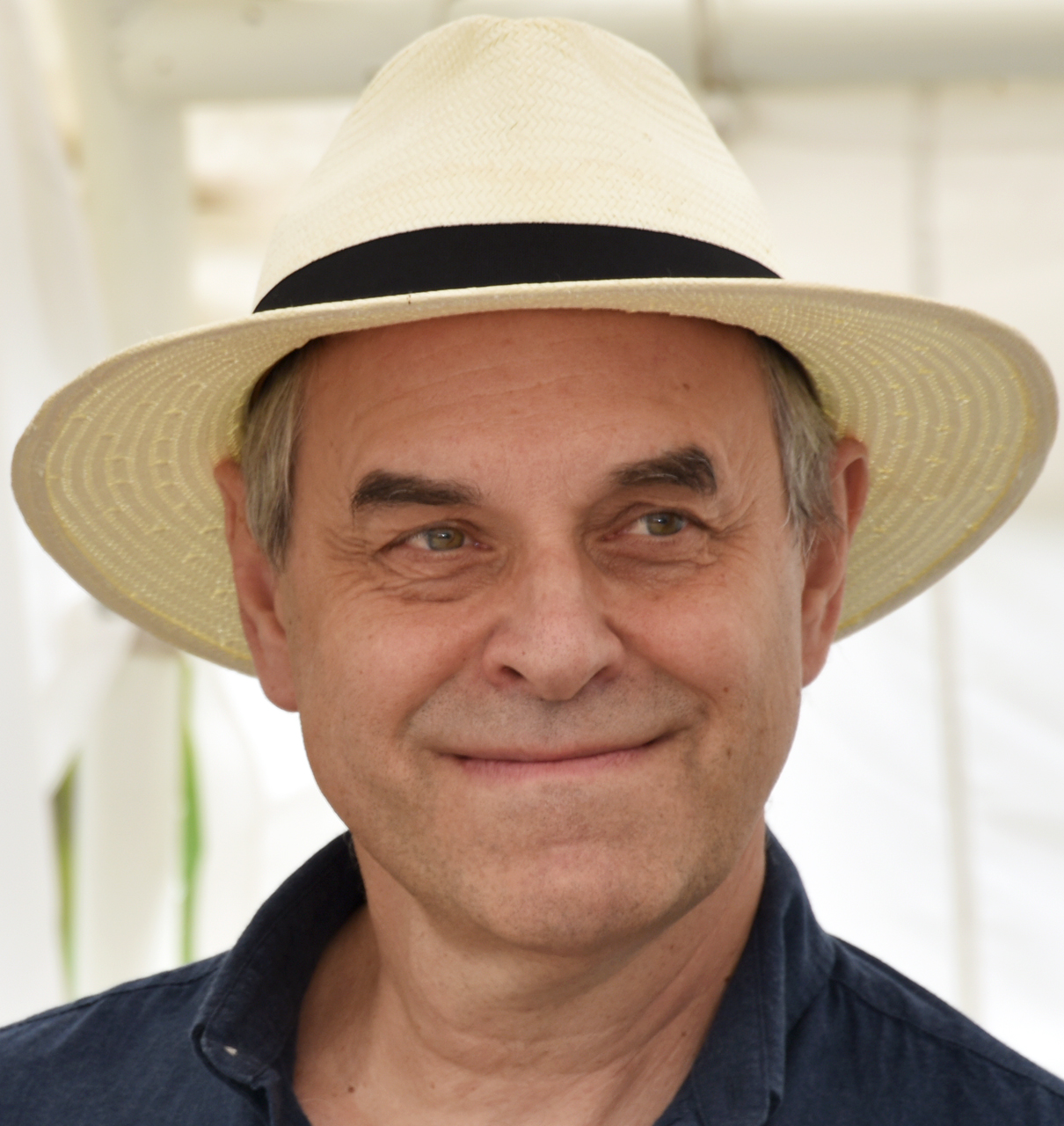
Miroslav Táborský won for The Girl of Your Dreams in 1998.

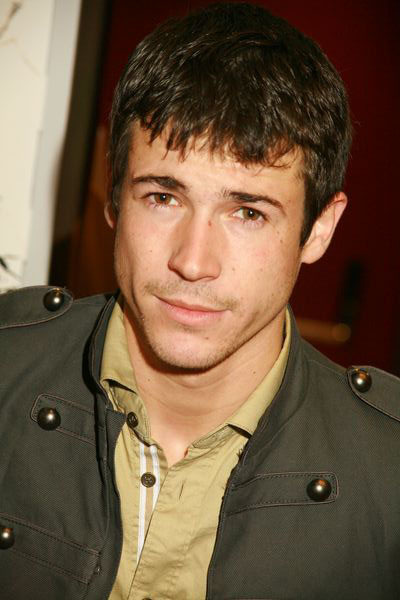
Juan José Ballesta won for Pellet in 2000.

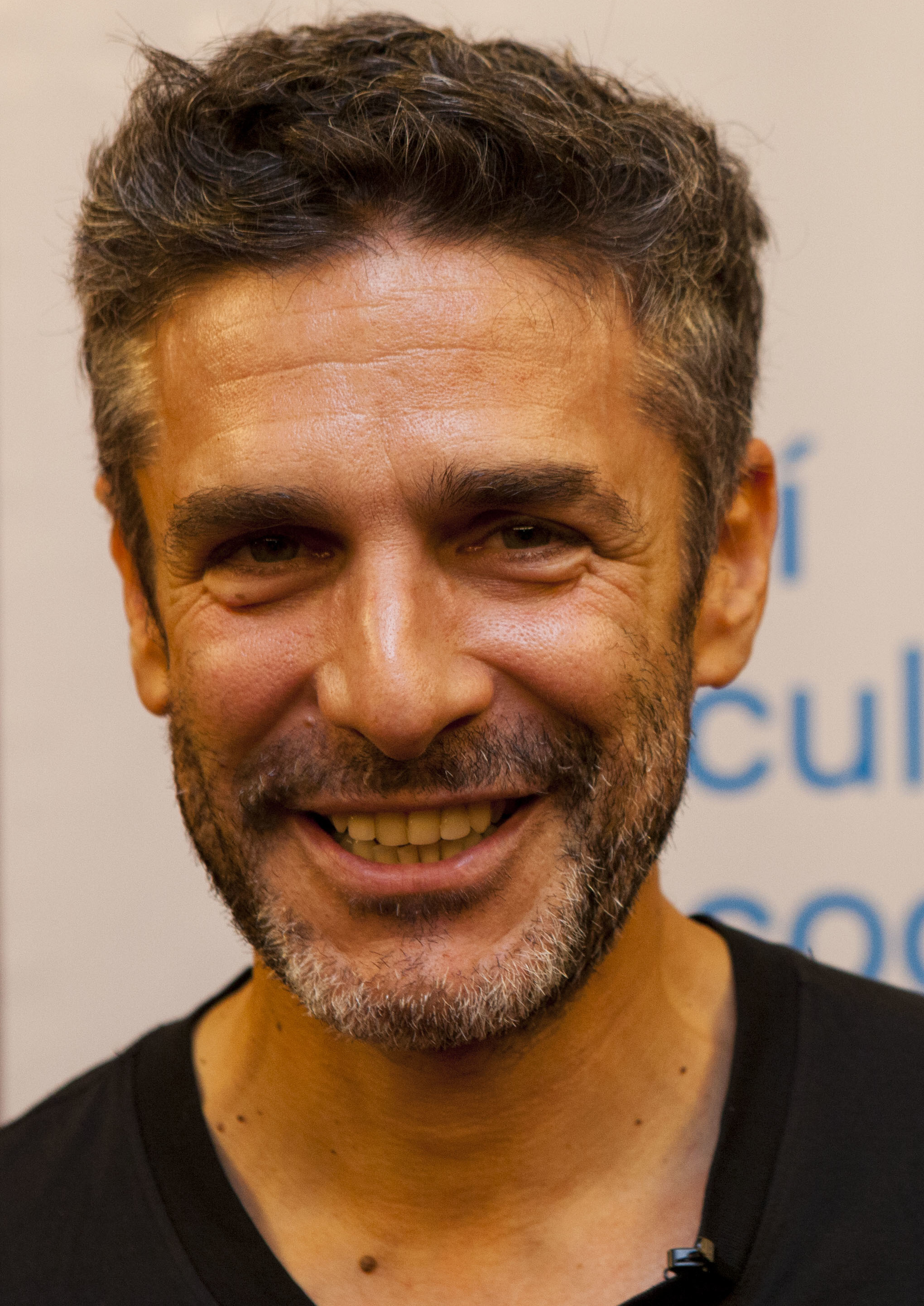
Leonardo Sbaraglia won for Intacto in 2001.

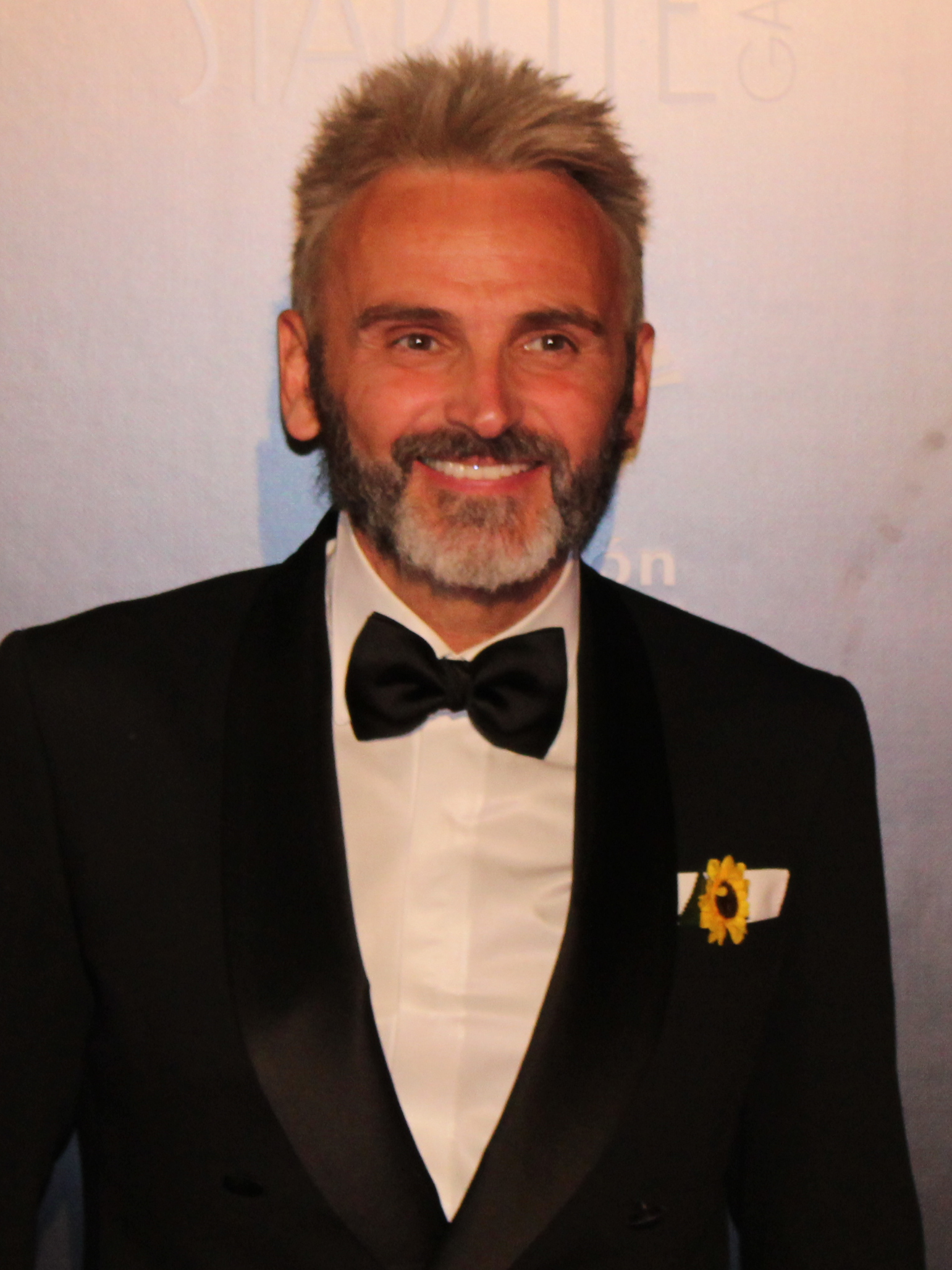
Fernando Tejero won for Football Days in 2003.

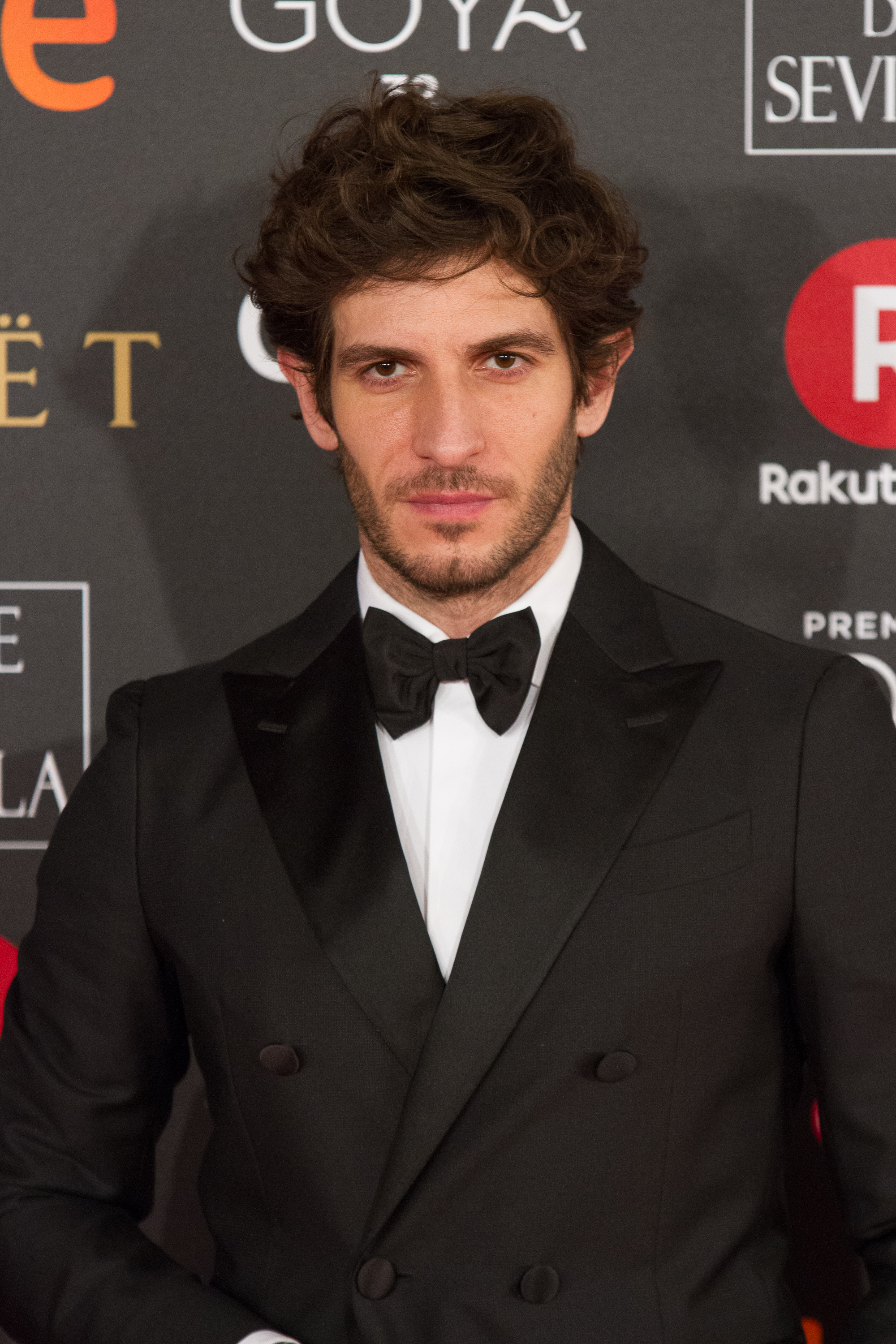
Quim Gutiérrez won for DarkBlueAlmostBlack in 2006.

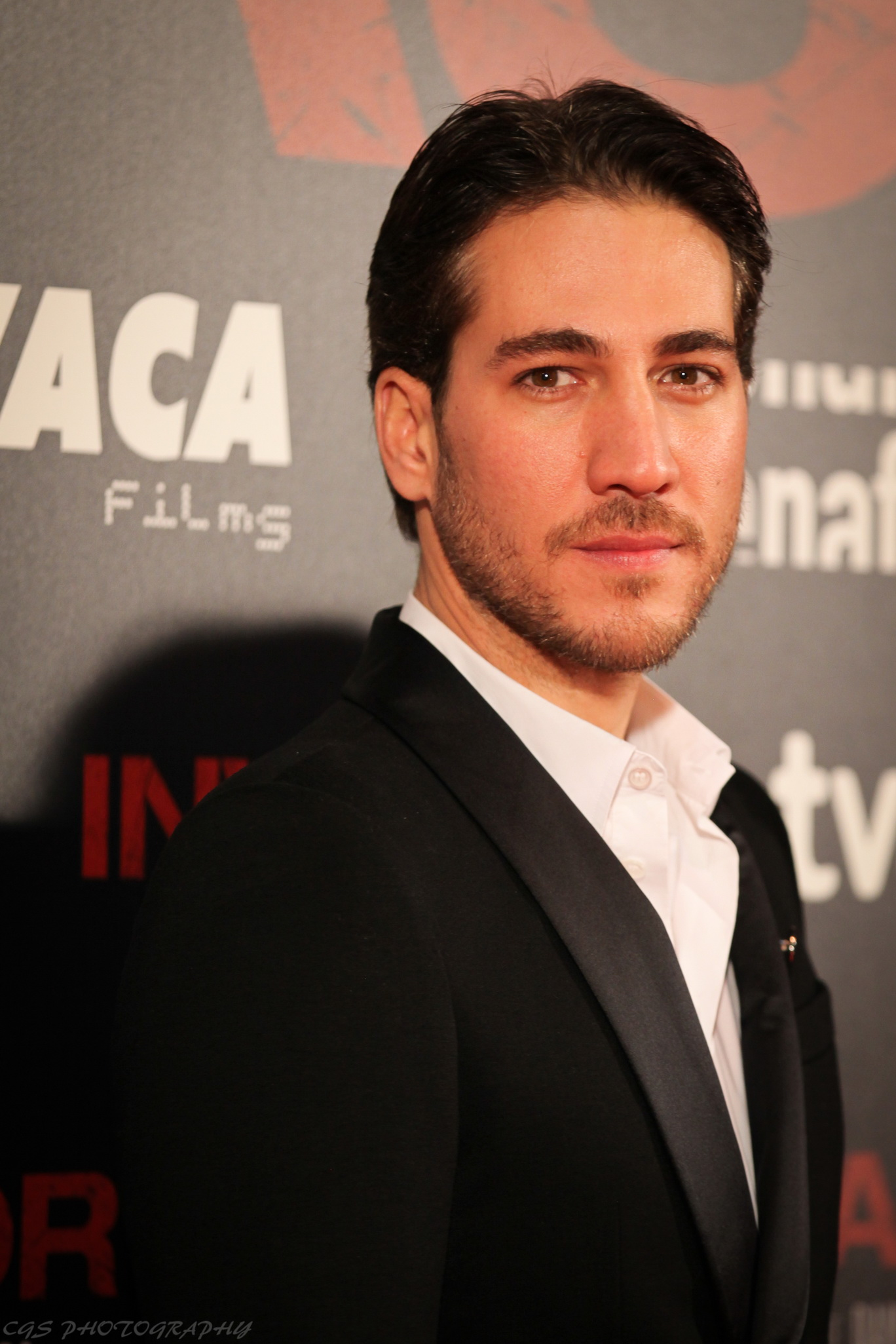
Alberto Ammann won for Cell 211 in 2009.

=== 1990s ===
Year	Actress	Role(s)	English title	Original title
1994 (9th)	Saturnino García	Justino	Justino, a Senior Citizen Killer	Justino, un asesino de la tercera edad
1994 (9th)	Coque Malla	Paula	It's All Lies	Todo es mentira
1994 (9th)	Pepón Nieto	Ugarte	Running Out of Time	Días contados
1995 (10th)	Santiago Segura	José María	The Day of the Beast	El día de la bestia
1995 (10th)	Juan Diego Botto	Carlos	Stories from the Kronen	Historias del Kronen
1995 (10th)	Carlos Fuentes	Rafa	Antarctica	Antártida
1996 (11th)	Fele Martínez	Chema	Thesis	Tesis
1996 (11th)	Emilio Buale	Ombasi	Bwana	
1996 (11th)	Liberto Rabal	Manuel	Tramway to Malvarrosa	Tranvía a la Malvarrosa
1997 (12th)	Andoni Erburu	Javi	Secrets of the Heart	Secretos del corazón
1997 (12th)	Manuel Manquiña	Pazos	Airbag	
1997 (12th)	Fernando Ramallo	Felipe	Backroads	Carreteras secundarias
1998 (13th)	Miroslav Táborský	Václav Passer	The Girl of Your Dreams	La niña de tus ojos
1998 (13th)	Ernesto Alterio	Jaime	The Stolen Years	Los años bárbaros
1998 (13th)	Javier Cámara	Rafael "Rafi" Jiménez Valera	Torrente, the Dumb Arm of the Law	Torrente, el brazo tonto de la ley
1998 (13th)	Tristán Ulloa	Javi	Mensaka	Mensaka, páginas de una historia
1999 (14th)	Carlos Álvarez-Nóvoa	The neighbour	Alone	Solas
1999 (14th)	Eduard Fernández	Miguel	Washington Wolves	Los lobos de Washington
1999 (14th)	Manuel Lozano	Moncho	Butterfly's Tongue	La lengua de las mariposas
1999 (14th)	Luis Tosar	Damián	Flowers from Another World	Flores de otro mundo

=== 2000s ===
Year	Actress	Role(s)	English title	Original title
2000 (15th)	Juan José Ballesta	Pablo "El Bola"	Pellet	El Bola
2000 (15th)	Jordi Vilches	Nico	Nico and Dani	Krámpack
2000 (15th)	Javier Batanero	Salva	Leo	
2000 (15th)	Pablo Carbonell	Carolo Suárez Perales	Masterpiece	Obra maestra
2001 (16th)	Leonardo Sbaraglia	Tomás	Intacto	
2001 (16th)	Biel Durán	David	No Pain, No Gain	Más pena que Gloria
2001 (16th)	James Bentley	Nicholas Stewart	The Others	Los otros
2001 (16th)	Rubén Ochandiano	Sebas	Broken Silence	Silencio roto
2002 (17th)	José Ángel Egido	Paulino "Lino" Rivas	Mondays in the Sun	Los lunes al sol
2002 (17th)	Roberto Enríquez	Rubén Bevilacqua	The Impatient Alchemist	El alquimista impaciente
2002 (17th)	Carlos Iglesias	Sancho Panza	Don Quixote, Knight Errant	El caballero Don Quijote
2002 (17th)	Guillermo Toledo	Pedro	The Other Side of the Bed	El otro lado de la cama
2003 (18th)	Fernando Tejero	Serafín Espín	Football Days	Días de fútbol
2003 (18th)	Víctor Clavijo	Mateo	Silvia's Gift	El regalo de Silvia
2003 (18th)	Juan Sanz	Fito	Life Marks	La vida mancha
2003 (18th)	Óscar Jaenada	Alfredo	Noviembre	
2004 (19th)	Tamar Novas	Javi	The Sea Inside	Mar adentro
2004 (19th)	José Luis García Pérez	Pedro	Bear Cub	Cachorro
2004 (19th)	Nilo Mur	Héctor	Héctor	
2004 (19th)	Jorge Roelas	Montesinos	Tiovivo c. 1950	
2005 (20th)	Jesús Carroza	Richi	7 Virgins	7 vírgenes
2005 (20th)	Luis Callejo	Manuel	Princesas	
2005 (20th)	Pablo Echarri	Ricardo	The Method	El método
2005 (20th)	Álex González	Ángel	Round Two	Segundo asalto
2006 (21st)	Quim Gutiérrez	Jorge	DarkBlueAlmostBlack	AzulOscuroCasiNegro
2006 (21st)	Alberto Amarilla	Miguelito	Summer Rain	El camino de los ingleses
2006 (21st)	Javier Cifrián	Caín	The Near East	El próximo Oriente
2006 (21st)	Walter Vidarte	Amós	The Night of the Sunflowers	La noche de los girasoles
2007 (22nd)	José Luis Torrijo	Pedro	Solitary Fragments	La soledad
2007 (22nd)	Óscar Abad	Martín	The Field of Stars	El prado de las estrellas
2007 (22nd)	Gonzalo de Castro	Fernando	Suso's Tower	La torre de Suso
2007 (22nd)	Roger Príncep	Simón	The Orphanage	El orfanato
2008 (23rd)	El Langui	Quique Heredia "El Cuajo"	The One-Handed Trick	El truco del manco
2008 (23rd)	Luis Bermejo	Father Lorenzo	One Word from You	Una palabra tuya
2008 (23rd)	Álvaro Cervantes	David	The Hanged Man	El juego del ahorcado
2008 (23rd)	Martiño Rivas	Eulalio "Lalo" Peciña	The Blind Sunflowers	Los girasoles ciegos
2009 (24th)	Alberto Ammann	Juan Oliver	Cell 211	Celda 211
2009 (24th)	Fernando Albizu	Andrés	Fat People	Gordos
2009 (24th)	Gorka Otxoa	Chema	Friend Zone	Pagafantas
2009 (24th)	Pablo Pineda	Daniel	Yo, también	

=== 2010s ===
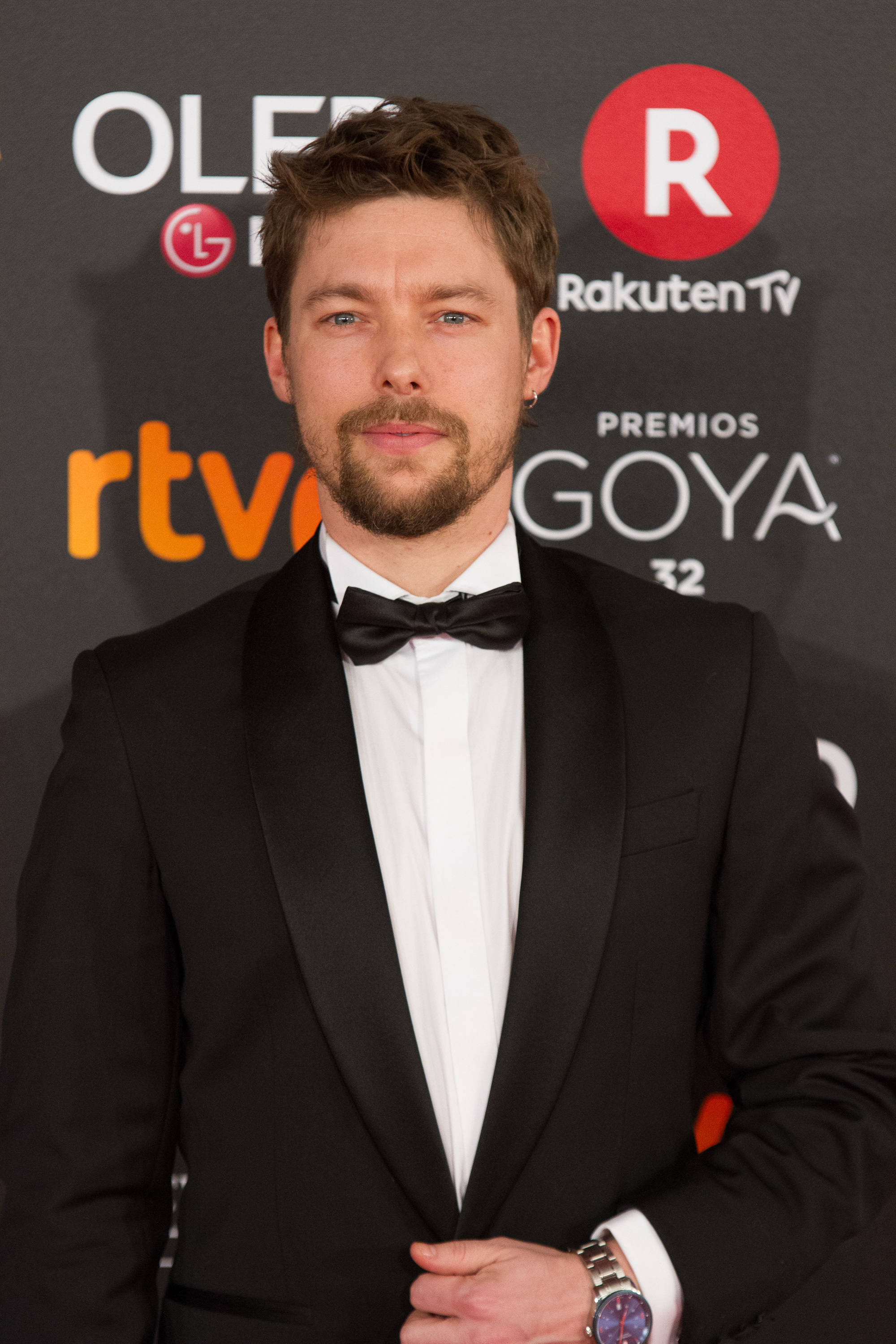
Jan Cornet won for The Skin I Live In in 2011.

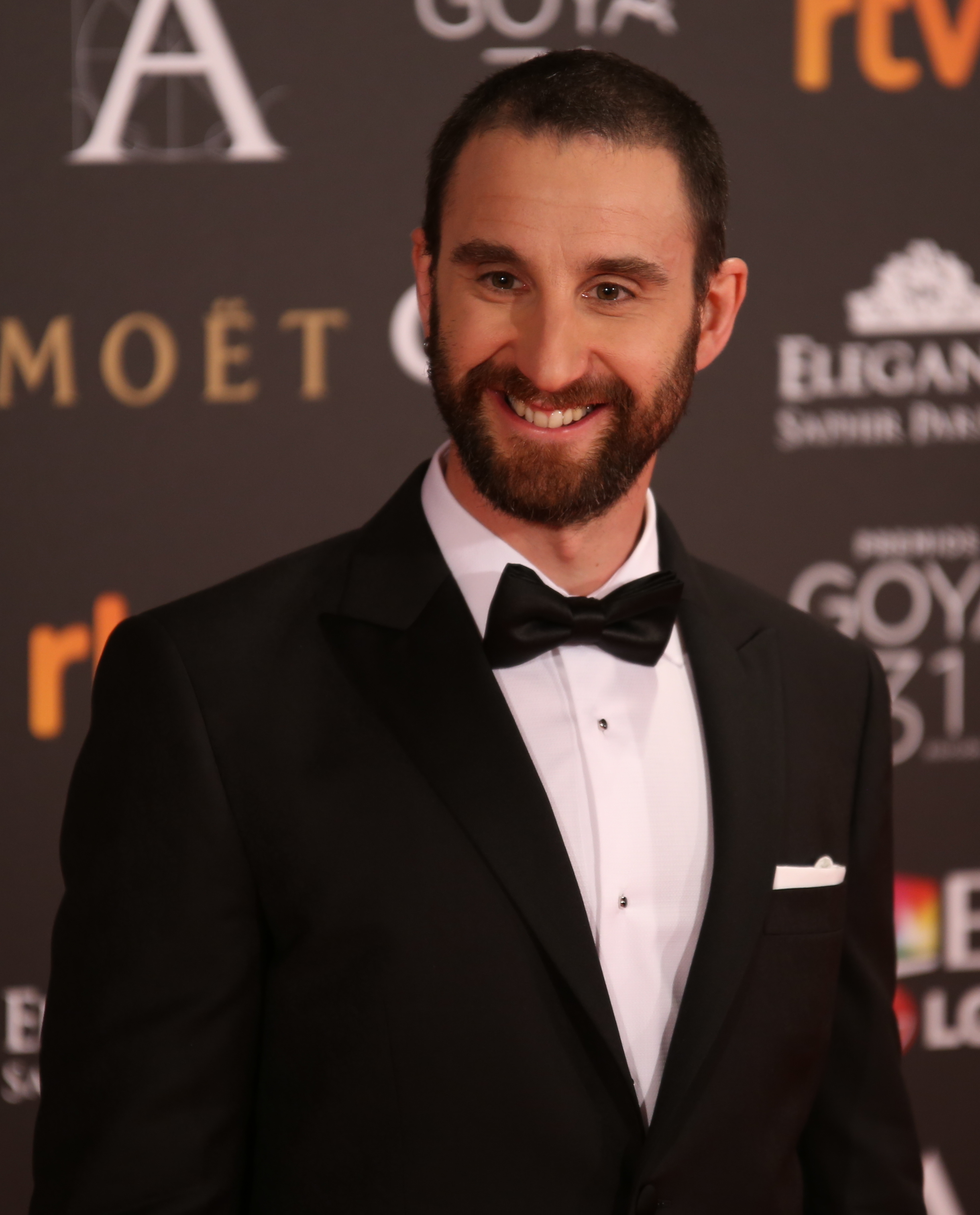
Dani Rovira won for Spanish Affair in 2014.

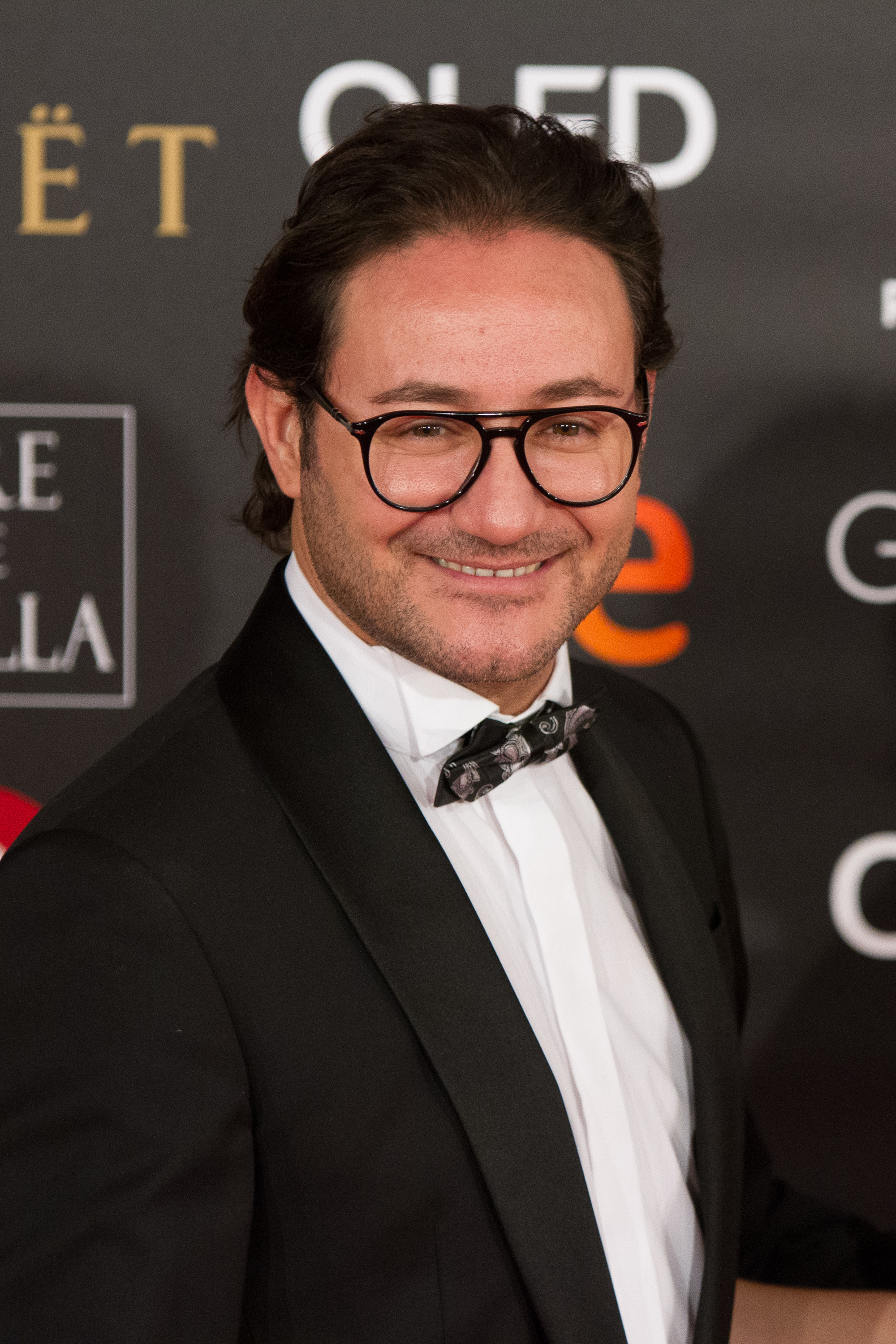
Carlos Santos won for Smoke & Mirrors in 2016.

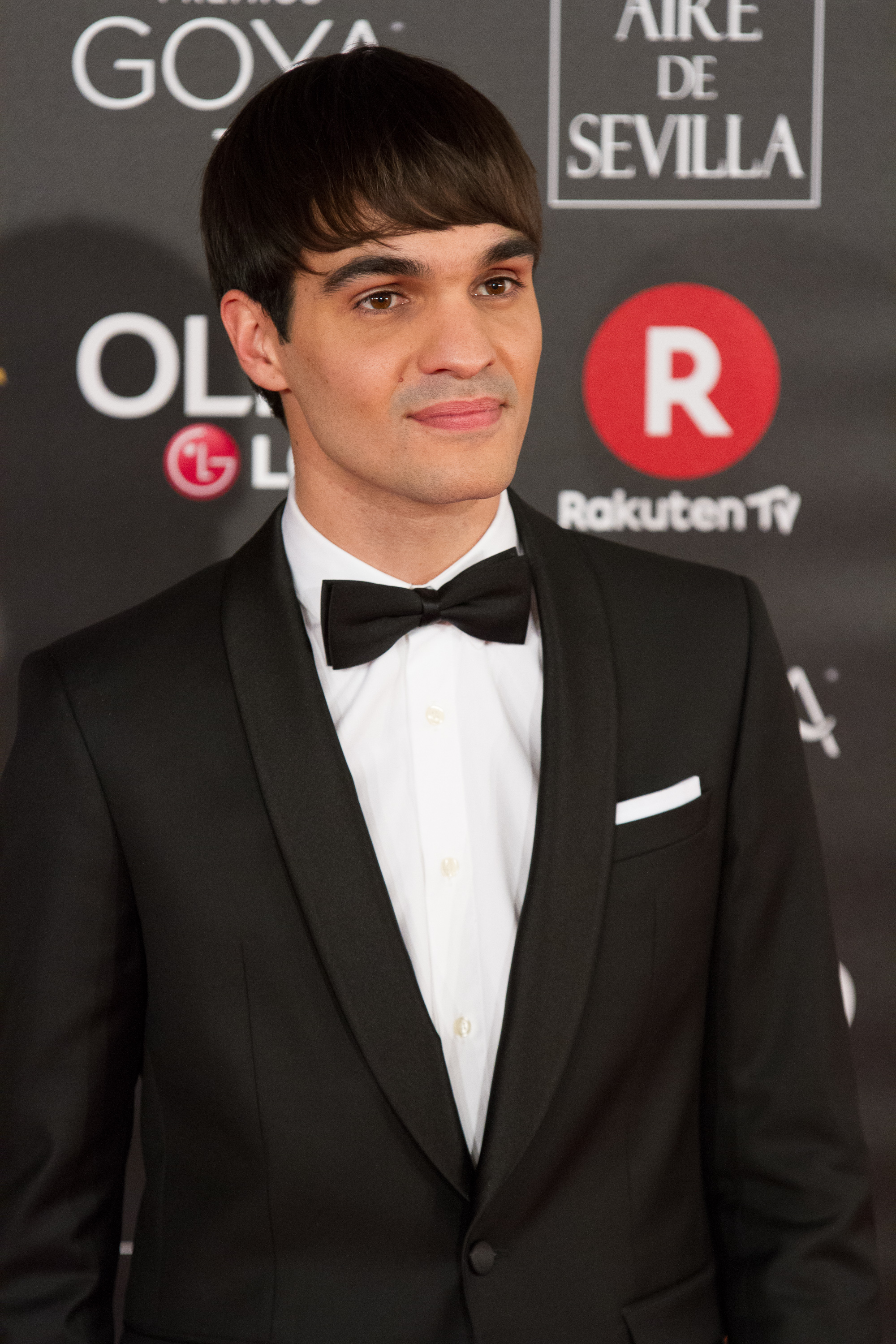
Eneko Sagardoy won for Giant in 2017.

Year	Actress	Role(s)	English title	Original title
2010 (25th)	Francesc Colomer	Andreu	Black Bread	Pa negre (Pan negro)
2010 (25th)	Manuel Camacho	Marcos Rodríguez Pantoja (7 year-old)	Entrelobos	
2010 (25th)	Juan Carlos Aduviri	Daniel / Atuey	Even the Rain	También la lluvia
2010 (25th)	Oriol Vila	Ramiro	Todas las canciones hablan de mí	
2011 (26th)	Jan Cornet	Vicente	The Skin I Live In	La piel que habito
2011 (26th)	Marc Clotet	Paulino	The Sleeping Voice	La voz dormida
2011 (26th)	Adrián Lastra	José Miguel	Cousinhood	Primos
2011 (26th)	José Mota	Roberto Gómez	As Luck Would Have It	La chispa de la vida
2012 (27th)	Joaquín Núñez	Mateo Prado Jiménez	Unit 7	Grupo 7
2012 (27th)	Emilio Gavira	Jesusín	Snow White	Blancanieves
2012 (27th)	Àlex Monner	Álex	The Wild Ones	Els nens salvatges
2012 (27th)	Tom Holland	Lucas Bennett	The Impossible	Lo imposible
2013 (28th)	Javier Pereira	Él	Stockholm	
2013 (28th)	Berto Romero	Pedro	Three Many Weddings	3 de bodas de más
2013 (28th)	Hovik Keuchkerian	Pedro	Scorpion in Love	Alacrán enamorado
2013 (28th)	Patrick Criado	Efraín Montero	Family United	La gran familia española
2014 (29th)	Dani Rovira	Rafael Quirós	Spanish Affair	Ocho apellidos vascos
2014 (29th)	David Verdaguer	Sergi	10,000 km	10.000 km
2014 (29th)	Jesús Castro	Niño	El Niño	
2014 (29th)	Israel Elejalde	Alfredo	Magical Girl	
2015 (30th)	Miguel Herrán	Darío	Nothing in Return	A cambio de nada
2015 (30th)	Fernando Colomo	Fernando	Isla bonita	
2015 (30th)	Manuel Burque	Borja	Requirements to Be a Normal Person	Requisitos para ser una persona normal
2015 (30th)	Álex García	Leonardo	The Bride	La novia
2016 (31st)	Carlos Santos	Luis Roldán	Smoke & Mirrors	El hombre de las mil caras
2016 (31st)	Rodrigo de la Serna	Uruguayo	To Steal from a Thief	Cien años de perdón
2016 (31st)	Ricardo Gómez	Soldado José	1898, Our Last Men in the Philippines	1898. Los últimos de Filipinas
2016 (31st)	Raúl Jiménez	Juanjo	The Fury of a Patient Man	Tarde para la ira
2017 (32nd)	Eneko Sagardoy	Joaquin	Giant	Handia
2017 (32nd)	Pol Monen	Carlos	Amar	
2017 (32nd)	Eloi Costa	Cristián	Skins	Pieles
2017 (32nd)	Santiago Alverú	Bosco	Selfie	
2018 (33rd)	Jesús Vidal	Marín	Champions	Campeones
2018 (33rd)	Moreno Borja	Paco	Carmen & Lola	Carmen y Lola
2018 (33rd)	Francisco Reyes	Rodrigo Alvarado	The Realm	El reino
2018 (33rd)	Carlos Acosta	Carlos Acosta	Yuli: The Carlos Acosta Story	Yuli
2019 (34th)	Enric Auquer	Kiko	Eye for an Eye	Quien a hierro mata
2019 (34th)	Santi Prego	Francisco Franco	While at War	Mientras dure la guerra
2019 (34th)	Nacho Sánchez	Ismael	Seventeen	Diecisiete
2019 (34th)	Vicente Vergara	Gonzalo	The Endless Trench	La trinchera infinita

=== 2020s ===
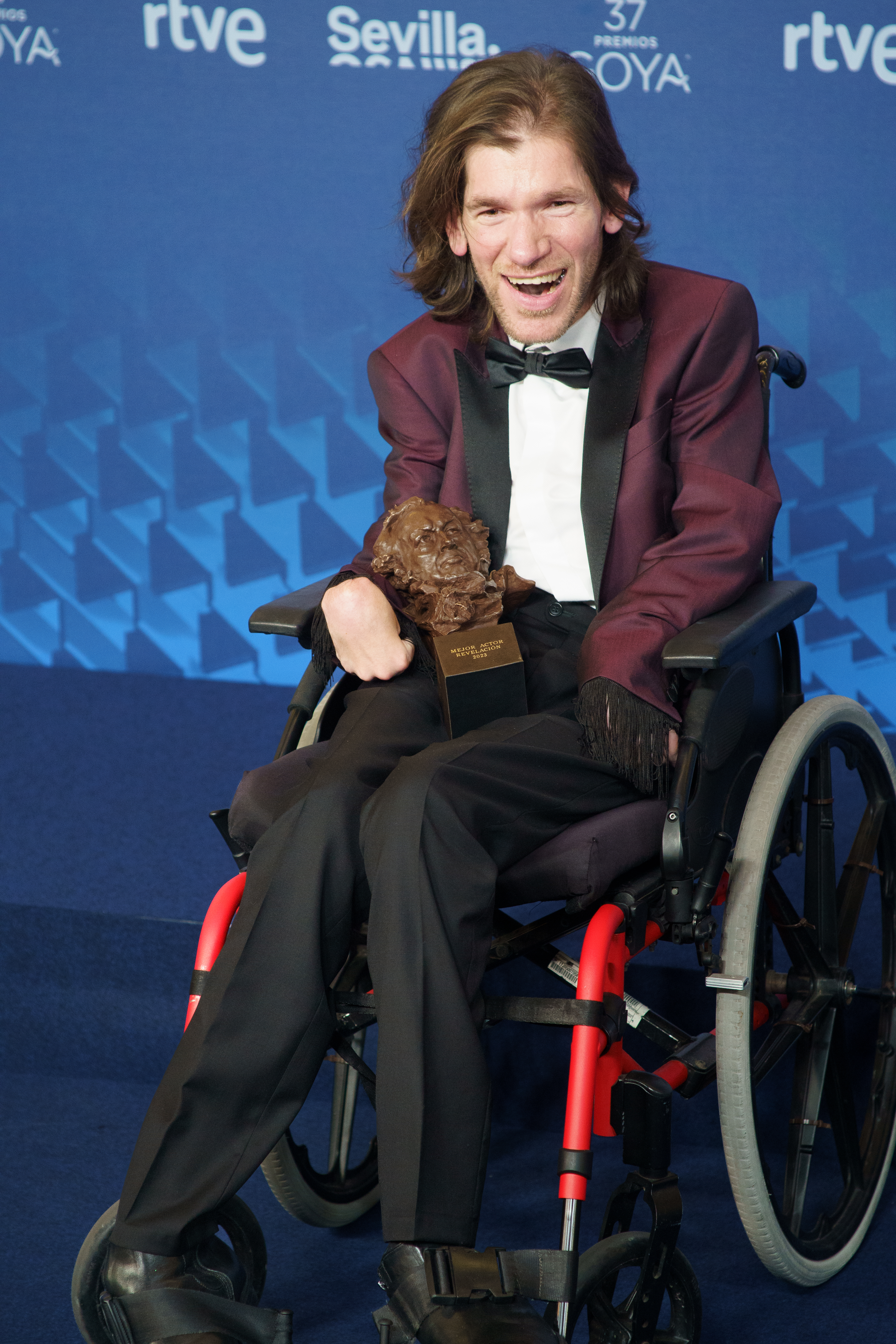
Telmo Irureta won for The Rite of Spring (2022).

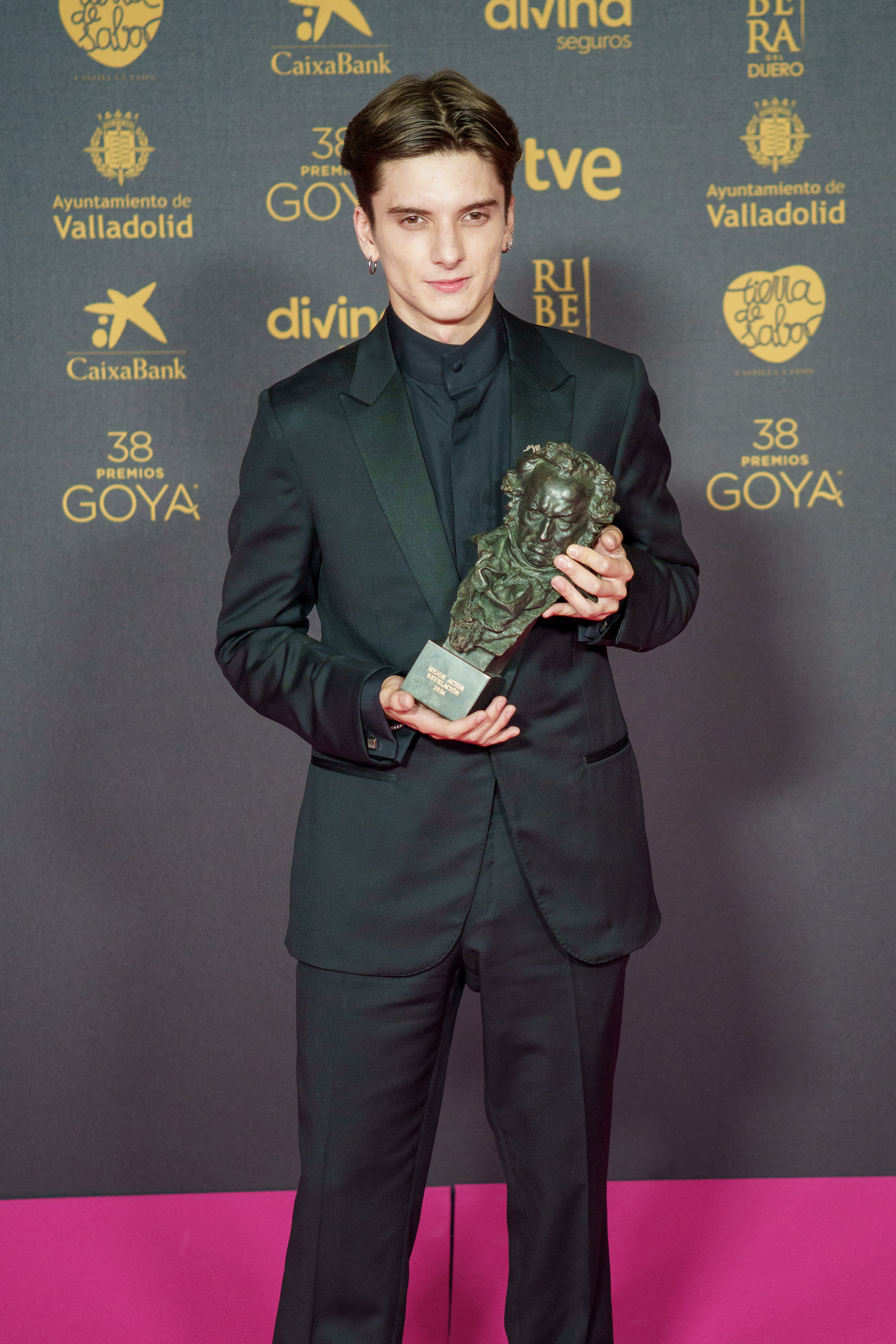
Matías Recalt won for Society of the Snow (2023).

Year	Actress	Role(s)	English title	Original title
2020 (35th)	Adam Nourou	Massar	Adú	
2020 (35th)	Chema del Barco	Ramón	The Plan	El plan
2020 (35th)	Matías Janick	Ayoub	Unfortunate Stories	Historias lamentables
2020 (35th)	Fernando Valdivielso	Ray	Cross the Line	No matarás
2021 (36th)	Chechu Salgado	Zarco	Outlaws	Las leyes de la frontera
2021 (36th)	Óscar de la Fuente	José	The Good Boss	El buen patrón
2021 (36th)	Tarik Rmili	Khaled	The Good Boss	El buen patrón
2021 (36th)	Jorge Motos	Lucas	Lucas	
2022 (37th)	Telmo Irureta	David	The Rite of Spring	La consagración de la primavera
2022 (37th)	Albert Bosch	Roger	Alcarràs	
2022 (37th)	Jordi Pujol Dolcet	Quimet	Alcarràs	
2022 (37th)	Mikel Bustamante	Javi	Lullaby	Cinco lobitos
2022 (37th)	Christian Checa	Raúl	On the Fringe	En los márgenes
2023 (38th)	Matías Recalt	Roberto Canessa	Society of the Snow	La sociedad de la nieve
2023 (38th)	Omar Banana	Miguel Acosta Fernández	Love & Revolution	Te estoy amando locamente
2023 (38th)	La Dani	Dani	Love & Revolution	Te estoy amando locamente
2023 (38th)	Brianeitor	Himself	Championext	Campeonex
2023 (38th)	Julio Hu Chen	Wang	Chinas, a Second Generation Story	Chinas
2024 (39th)	Pepe Lorente	Mauricio Aznar	The Blue Star	La estrella azul
2024 (39th)	Óscar Lasarte	Miguel Gila	May I Speak with the Enemy?	¿Es el enemigo? La película de Gila
2024 (39th)	Cuti Carabajal	Carlos Carabajal	The Blue Star	La estrella azul
2024 (39th)	Cristalino	The guitarist	Saturn Return	Segundo premio
2024 (39th)	Daniel Ibáñez	The singer	Saturn Return	Segundo premio
2025 (40th)	Antonio Fernández Gabarre	Toni	Sleepless City	Ciudad sin sueño
2025 (40th)	Julio Peña	Miguel de Cervantes	The Captive	El cautivo
2025 (40th)	Hugo Welzel	Rubio	Enemies	Enemigos
2025 (40th)	Jan Monter Palau	Dídac	Strange River	Estrany riu
2025 (40th)	Mitch	Nuno	Romería	
