= Championext =

- Theatrical release poster
- Spanish: Campeonex
- Directed by: Javier Fesser
- Written by: Javier Fesser; Athenea Mata; David Marqués
- Produced by: Álvaro Longoria; Luis Manso; Pilar Benito; Javier Fesser
- Starring: Jesús Vidal; Gloria Ramos; Sergio Olmo; Jesús Lago Solís; José de Luna; Fran Fuentes; Alberto Nieto; Roberto Chinchilla; Stefan López
- Cinematography: Ángel Amorós
- Edited by: Javi Frutos
- Production companies: Morena Films; Películas Pendelton
- Distributed by: Universal Pictures International Spain
- Release date: August 18, 2023
- Running time: 125 minutes
- Country: Spain
- Language: Spanish
- Box office: €11.7 million

Championext (Spanish: Campeonex) is a 2023 Spanish sports comedy-drama film directed by Javier Fesser and written by Fesser, Athenea Mata and David Marqués. It is a sequel to the 2018 film Champions. Once again, it stars Jesús Vidal, Gloria Ramos, Sergio Olmo, Jesús Lago Solís, José de Luna, Fran Fuentes, Alberto Nieto, Roberto Chinchilla and Stefan López. It premiered on August 18, 2023, in Spanish theaters.

== Synopsis ==
The basketball team of Los Amigos, composed of players with various degrees of intellectual disability, wins the final of its championship but they are disqualified because Sergio, one of their players, was sent on the bench and, frustrated, stole the medals and went away.

Two years later, Julio, the club's president, manages to recruit a new coach, Cecilia. She has no experience and needs to validate a year of training to validate her graduation. She also was bullied during her studies as she has the reputation of being a black cat and bringing bad luck on everyone and everything she touches. Still, almost all former players accept to reform the team, but not if Sergio comes back. However, when Cecilia applies for the club qualification at the last minute, she forces the attendant to accept the team but in the process she registers the team for athletics instead of basketball. The team trains hard and even accepts Sergio back but the latter comes with a newcomer, Brian, whom he has befriended in a healthcare center. Brian is a teenager with a passion for gaming and is on wheelchair due to a severe muscular disease.

The team trains hard but on their way to their first tournament, their van collapses and they cannot reach the site on time. In the meanwhile, Brian is qualified for a hybrid gaming tournament, involving him as captain and team of "real runners" on the field: the Real Runners. Despite Sergio arriving very late in the arena, and thanks to the efforts of the team and their fairplay, they finally win. Julio, who suffered a heart attack before the tournament, witnesses their victory online, only to die later.

== Cast ==
- Elisa Hipólito as Cecilia
- Jesús Vidal as Marin
- Gloria Ramos as Collantes
- Sergio Olmo as Sergio
- Jesús Lago Solís as Jesús
- José de Luna as Juanma
- Fran Fuentes as Paquito
- Alberto Nieto as Benito
- Roberto Chinchilla as Román
- Stefan López as Manuel
- Brianeitor as Brian
- Juan Pino Rodil
- Jelen García as Andy
- Julian Margallo as Julio, the elderly club president

== Production ==
Principal photography began at the end of August 2022 and ended at the end of November of the same year in Madrid, Spain for 9 weeks.

== Release ==
The film was released theatrically in Spain on August 18, 2023. It became the largest-grossing film on that Friday with €603,000 and a 32% box-office share. It ended with a €1.72 million opening weekend.

== Accolades ==
Year	Award	Category	Nominee(s)	Result	Ref.
2023	29th Forqué Awards	Cinema and Education in Values		Nominated	
2023	29th Forqué Awards	Audience Award		Won	
2024	38th Goya Awards	Best New Actor	Brianeitor	Nominated	
2024	38th Goya Awards	Best Sound	Tamara Arévalo, Fabiola Ordoyo, Yasmina Praderas	Nominated	

== Reception ==
The film received various positive reviews and was described as "an efficient sequel" El País admitted the social value of the film was, as in the first film, present but that from a cinematographic point of view, the film was not an achievement. Another review criticised the length of the film ( 125 min), judged excessive for a comedy of this type. Other mixed reviews were published in El Correo, and in the Diario de Sevilla, which wrote, "The X in CampeoneX has to do with the idea of dissolving the physical and intellectual difficulties and differences of our heroes in the virtual universe of eSports, to which the film is delivered in a long final third only suitable for lovers of streaming or fans of Ibai Llanos. One might be misled to think that it is actually a new exercise in eXploitation of its subject matter and of each and every one of its characters and actors, disabled or not."

== See also ==
- List of Spanish films of 2023
