= Guillermo Fesser =

Spanish journalist

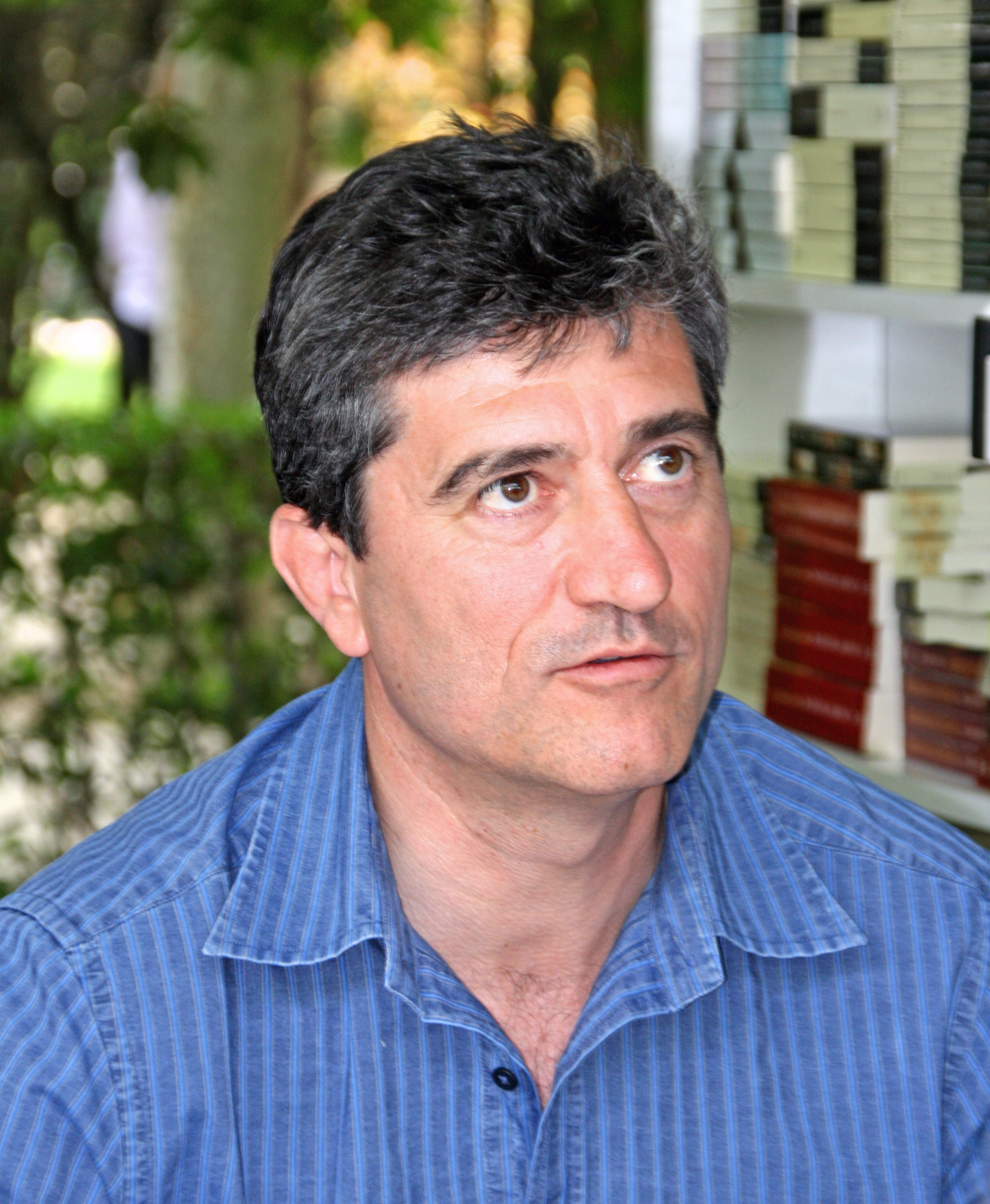
- Guillermo Fesser at Feria del Libro. Madrid, June 2008
- Born: Guillermo Fesser Pérez de Petinto; 4 May 1960 (age 66); Madrid, Spain

Guillermo Fesser Pérez de Petinto (Madrid; 1960) is a Spanish journalist, radio presenter, writer and filmmaker. He is best known for utilizing humor while reporting news on Spanish radio throughout his program called Gomaespuma. It gained a significant audience during serious media of the time and was an instant hit. Fesser studied journalism at the Universidad Complutense de Madrid and later received a Fulbright Scholarship to study film at the University of Southern California.

With his partner Juan Luis Cano, Fesser created in 1984 Gomaespuma, a company that has produced shows and commercials for radio and television as well as books, music albums and cultural events. Fesser and Cano have also been involved in the Gomaespuma Foundation, which supports children educational and social projects.

Fesser has also directed, executive produced and was one of the screenwriters of the film Cándida (2006).

== Radio ==
Fesser began his career in Spanish radio during the early 1980s. For 25 years (1982–2007) he was hosting with his partner Juan Luis Cano one of the most popular radio shows in Spain: Gomaespuma. In 1982, Fesser and Cano created Gomaespuma as a weekly late night program in Antena 3 Radio, and it got to its peak as a daily morning show on M-80 Radio, with over 1 Million listeners throughout the country.

During the Gomaespuma years, Cano and Fesser traveled around the world to cover the news, interviewing key people like the King of Jordan and Vice President Al Gore just to name a few. Both, Fesser and Cano became personally involved in attempting to fight against poverty and injustice. This was what led them into creating the foundation that bears the name of their radio program Gomaespuma. To raise funds for the foundation, Gomaespuma organizes cultural events as the Flamenco Festival Flamenco Pá Tós that promotes flamenco dance and music locally in Madrid (Spain), and internationally in cities like Beijing (China), Argel (Argelia) and Managua (Nicaragua). Profits from the festival help finance the educational projects.

Fesser and Cano became closely associated with the programme’s humorous approach to radio broadcasting. Their work also included interviews, entertainment programming and coverage of social and cultural subjects.

Fesser met his partner Juan Luis Cano in 1977 at Universidad Complutense de Madrid.

== Movie ==
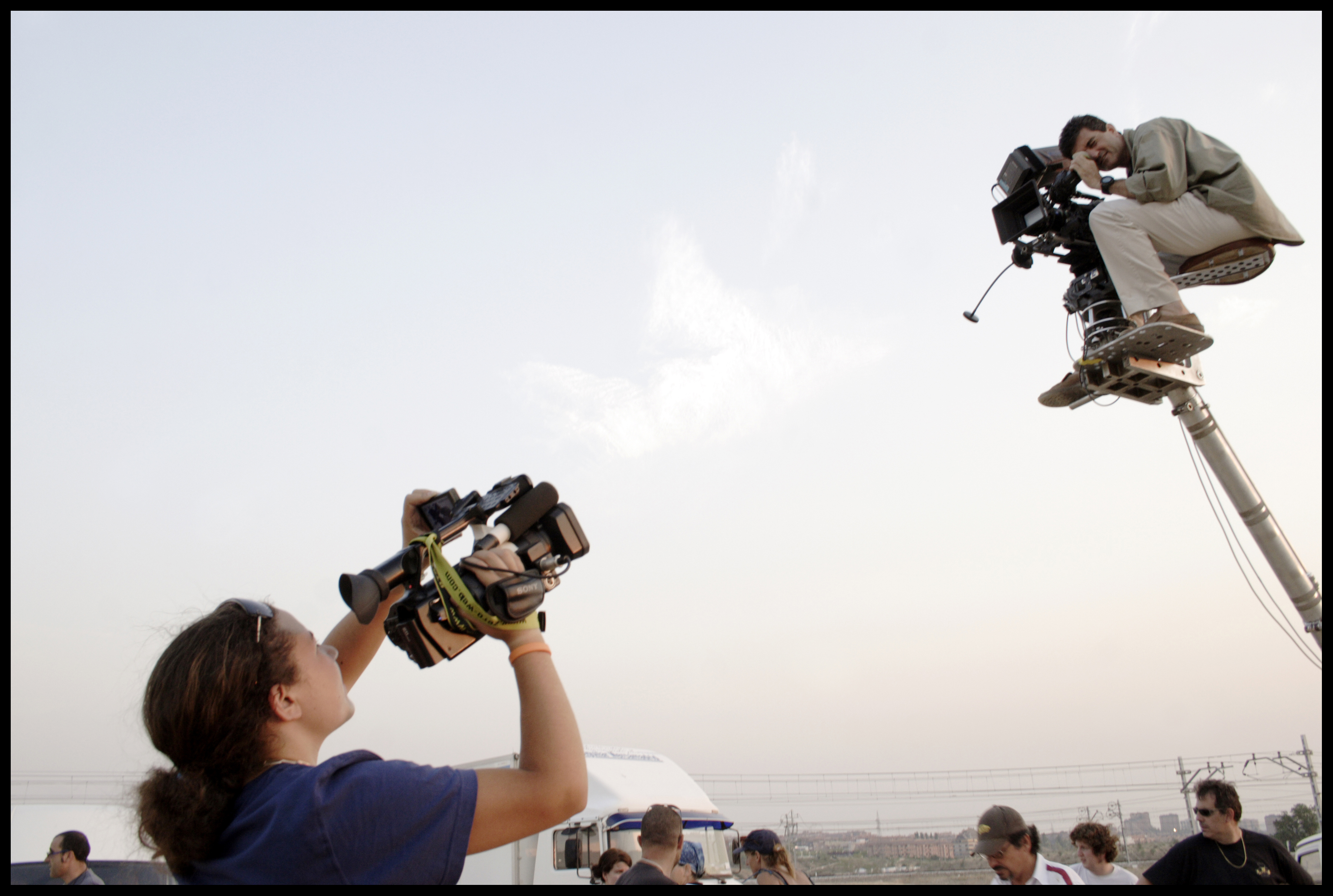
Guillermo Fesser during the filming of Candida. Madrid. Aug, 2005

Fesser co-wrote with his brother Javier the screenplay of two big box office movies: El Milagro de P. Tinto (1999) and La Gran Aventura de Mortadelo y Filemón (2003), both directed by his brother.

Guillermo Fesser directed in 2005 the feature film Cándida, a story based on his bestselling biography of a cleaning lady Cuando Dios Aprieta Ahoga Pero Bien (Memorias de Una Assistanta) (When God chokes, he chokes to death).

In 1994 Fesser produced, with the advice of Kermit Love, the puppeteer that created Big Bird for Sesame Street, a puppet show for Telecinco: Gomaespuma. Fesser has contributed Spanish-language adaptations and voice work for several international films, including Chicken Run, Quest For Camelot, Cats & Dogs, and Ali G Indahouse.

== Television ==
In the mid-1980s Guillermo Fesser presented the TV program La Tarde de Verano, with Pastora Vega and Toni Cantó, and for some months in 1992, the contest VIP Noche at Telecinco.

In 1994, he collaborated with Juan Luis Cano and Javier Fesser on Gomaespuma, a puppet programme for Telecinco. Fesser and Cano performed as puppeteers and contributed to the programme’s development.

Through Gomaespuma, Fesser also participated in television projects for Televisión Española (TVE), including Pasando Olímpicamente, broadcast during the 2008 Beijing Olympic Games, and Pasándolo de Cine, produced during the San Sebastián International Film Festival. He also worked on Gomaespuminglish, an educational programme for children.

== Literature ==
As a writer, Fesser has published several books and has written three fictional movie scripts. His first non-fiction book, Cuando Dios aprieta, ahoga pero bien: Cándida, memorias de una sirvienta (1998), is based on the life of Cándida Villar, who worked for the Fesser family. The book was adapted into the 2006 film Cándida, directed by Fesser.

His other published works include Familia no hay más que una, Grandes disgustos de la historia de España, ¿Quién me mandaría meterme en obras?, El Papa dijo no and ¡Vivan los novios!. He has also collaborated on comic books, including Marchando una de mili, Navidad con orejas, Pasando Olímpicamente and A la fuerza ahorcan.

== Others ==
Guillermo Fesser has been lately involved with projects that support the ideas behind the Buy Local and Slow Food movements. He is one of the promoters that have saved from demolition and renovated the old building and traditional market Mercado de San Miguel, a glass and iron building located downtown Madrid. He has published many articles in major newspapers like El País and El Mundo, and has taught script writing at the Universidad de Alcalá de Henares and Vassar College, Poughkeepsie. Fesser currently lives in Rhinebeck, New York. He is working with writer Mark Burns on a film about sustainable farming and the dangers of natural gas hydraulic fracturing. His first script for the theater, Ay Dios Mio! (Oh My God!), written with Cuban-Spanish author Eduardo Consuegra, is currently under production in Madrid.

== Bibliography ==
- ¿Quien Me Mandaría Meterme En Obras?
- Cuando Dios Aprieta, Ahoga pero Bien: Cándida, Memorias de una Sirvienta (1999)
- A Cien Millas de Manhattan (2008)
- El Misterioso Caso de los Fantasmas Solitarios (2011)
- Ruedas y el Secreto del GPS (2012)
- Ruedas y el Enigma del Campamento Moco Tendido (2013)
- Conoce a Bernardo de Gálvez (2017)
- Mi Amigo Invisible (2018)

== Filmography ==
Year	Title	Director	Writer	Actor	Role	Notes
1990	Mis Amigos Esperando a Tato	No	No	Yes		Short film
1994	Gomaespuma	Yes	Yes	Yes	Puppet Performer	TV series Also co-creator with Juan Luis Cano
1995	El Sedlecto de la Trompeta	No	No	Yes	El Productor de Cortos	Short film
1998	El Milagro de P. Tinto	No	Yes	No	—N/a	Feature film
2001	20 Años Gomaespuma	No	No	Yes	Self	Video documentary Also executive producer
2003	La Gran Aventura de Mortadelo y Filemón	No	Yes	No	—N/a	Feature film
2006	Cándida	Yes	Yes	No	—N/a	Feature film Also executive producer
2007	Gomaespuminglish	Yes	Yes	Yes	Puppet Performer	TV series Also co-creator with Juan Luis Cano
2015	Bienvenidos	No	Yes	No	—N/a	Short film
2020	El Monstruo Invisible	Yes	Yes	No	—N/a	Documentary short film Co-directed with Javier Fesser

== Personal life ==
He is also brother of a film director Javier Fesser and the cultural promoter Alberto Fesser.
