= Jesús Vidal =

Spanish actor

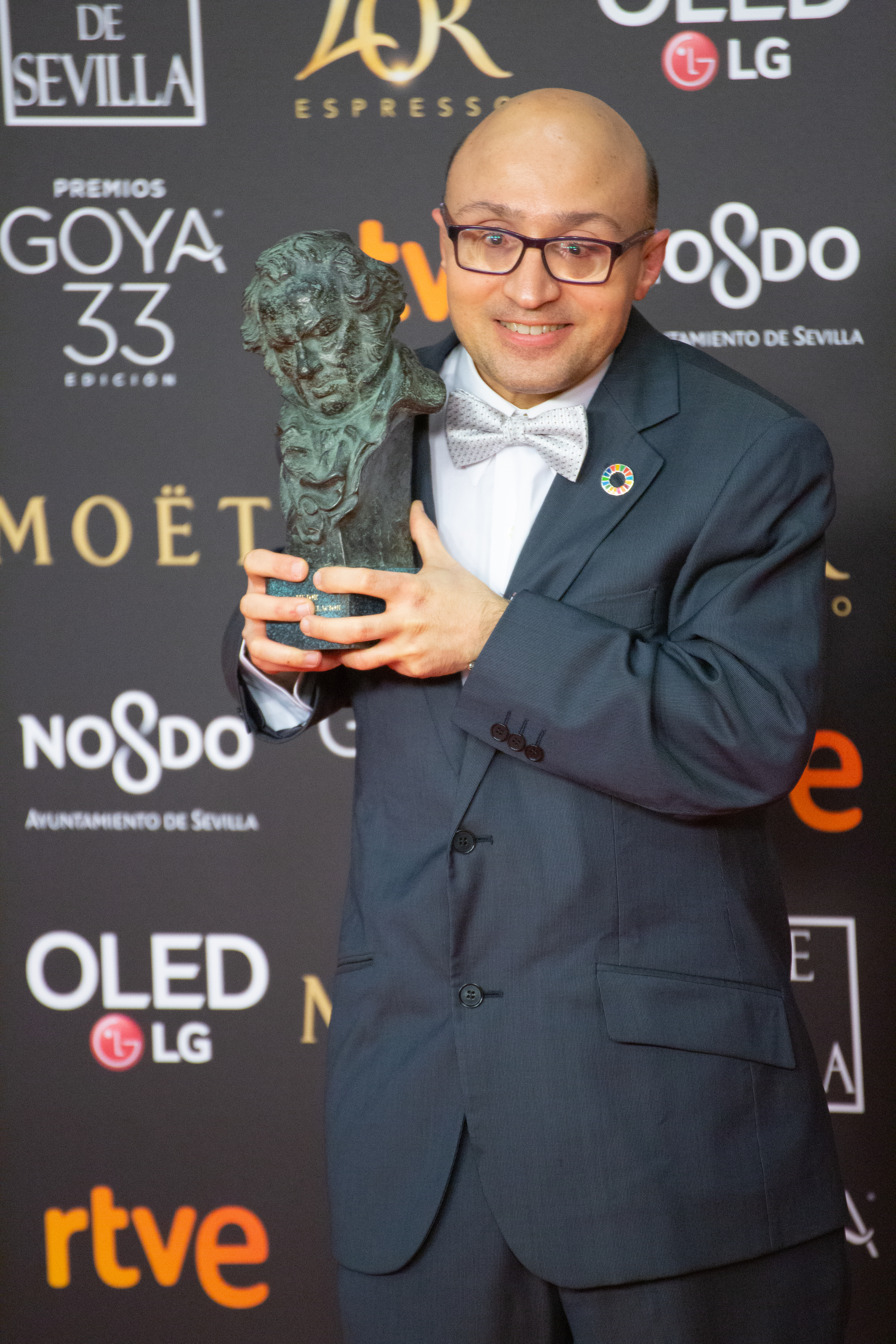
- Vidal at 33rd Goya Awards in 2019
- Born: 1975 (age 49–50); León, Spain
- Occupation(s): Journalist and actor
- Awards: Goya Award for Best New Actor for Campeones

Jesús Vidal (born 1975) is a Spanish actor. In 2019 he won Medallas del Círculo de Escritores Cinematográficos and Goya Award in the 33rd edition for Best New Actor for Campeones.

He was born in 1975 in León, Spain with a blindness of 90% and myopia in the right eye. He got a bachelor's degree in Spanish Language and Literature, a master's degree in journalism and he worked on sports section at agencia EFE. He is an amateur in cycling and he is a football fan of Real Sociedad de Fútbol.

In 2018 he played Marin in Campeones (2018), for which he won Best New Actor at 33rd edition, and its sequel Campeonex (2023). Then he will appear in the documentary film Ni distintos ni diferentes: Campeones (2018), directed by Álvaro Longoria and starring Campeones cast. In August 2019 he was cast on Zapeando. On 5 September 2019 he performed on the stage play Alguien voló sobre el nido del cuco at Teatro Calderón in Madrid, and he has written Sala de espera. Poemas y vivencias, with his short tales and poems.

== Filmography ==
- Campeones (2018) as Marin
- Ni distintos ni diferentes: Campeones (2018) as himself
- Campeonex (2023) as Marin
