= Binta and the Great Idea =

- Binta and the Great Idea
- Directed by: Javier Fesser
- Written by: Javier Fesser
- Produced by: Luis Manso
- Starring: Zeynabou Diallo; Agnile Sambou; Aminata Sane
- Cinematography: Chechu Graf
- Edited by: Javier Fesser
- Production company: Películas Pendelton
- Distributed by: Magnolia Pictures
- Release date: 25 October 2004
- Running time: 31 minutes
- Country: Spain
- Languages: Diola; French

Binta and the Great Idea (Spanish: Binta y la Gran Idea) is a 2004 Spanish film by writer-director Javier Fesser. The film stars Zeynabou Diallo as Binta, Agnile Sambou as Binta's Father, and Aminata Sane as Soda. The film duration is approximately 31 minutes and has dialogue in Diola and French. The film is included in Oscar Nominated Short Films by Magnolia Pictures and Shorts International; the theatrical release of this collection was February 16, 2007. It was made in collaboration with UNICEF, to which all of the profits were given.

== Plot ==
Binta is a young African girl who serves as the narrator. She talks about her father and his 'great idea'. Binta's father is a small-time, local fisherman in a peaceful village (near the town of Bignona) in Senegal. His friend who recently visited Europe describes what fishing is like there. He tells him that the Europeans can catch thousands of fish with bigger boats equipped with sonar. The man, very impressed by this, encourages the father to approach the government and request a permit for a bigger boat. Binta's father also hears from his friend how once he attains wealth he must get a permit for a weapon so he can defend his wealth. The friend also shows off his watch which has an alarm set to ring every day at noon. "What happens at noon?" asks Binta's father. "Why, the alarm rings!" his friend replies.

Binta's father is shown making his way up through the ranks of government, sharing his great ideas with various officials. The film switches back and forth between the story of Binta and her father and the struggle between Binta's cousin, Soda, and her father, a village elder. Soda desperately wants to go to school, but her father believes African girls should not be educated; they should learn to tend the home and then get married and tend to the home and family.

The village school children put on a play to convince Soda's father to let her attend school. In the end, the father is finally convinced, and Soda is allowed to get an education.

Finally, when Binta's father meets with the provincial leader, it is revealed what his great idea was: he wants do his part to make the world a better place by adopting a tubab (white child), "preferably weaned", to teach him or her qualities that Western industrialized society has largely lost, such as sharing, solidarity, and the sustainable use of resources.

== Cast ==
- Zeynabou Diallo as Binta
- Agnile Sambou as Binta's father
- Aminata Sane as Soda

== Awards ==
- 79th Academy Awards: 2007 – (Nominated); Best Short Film, Live Action
- George Lindsey/UNA Film Festival: 2007 – Best of Show, Best Professional Short Narrative
- Indianapolis International Film Festival: 2006 – Grand Jury Prize; Best Short Film
- Alcalá de Henares Short Film Festival: 2005 – City of Alcalá Award; Best Short Film
- Chicago International Children's Film Festival: 2004 – Montgomery Prize; Best Film or Video by an Emerging Director
