= Looking for Fidel =

Looking for Fidel is a documentary film by Oliver Stone, released in 2004. It is a follow-up to his 2003 documentary Comandante and likewise consists of interviews with the Cuban leader Fidel Castro. This time, interviews of some Cuban political dissidents are included as well. The film specifically deals with the 2003 crackdown on dissidents in Cuba, and the execution of three men who attempted to hijack a ferry to the United States.

Looking for Fidel was filmed in May 2003.
