= Guante blanco =

Spanish crime television series

- Genre: Crime; Drama; Thriller
- Based on: an original idea by Ramón Campos
- Directed by: Carlos Sedes; Eduardo Armiñán; Jorge Sánchez-Cabezudo
- Starring: Carlos Hipólito; José Luis García Pérez; José Ángel Egido; Eloy Azorín; Leticia Dolera; Jorge Roelas; Ana Risueño; Pilar Punzano
- Country of origin: Spain
- No. of seasons: 1
- No. of episodes: 8

Production
- Production company: Bambú Producciones

Original release
- Network: La 1/rtve.es
- Release: 15 October – 2 December 2008

Guante blanco is a Spanish crime television series produced by Bambú Producciones that was originally broadcast by RTVE in 2008. The cast features José Luis García Pérez, Carlos Hipólito, José Ángel Egido, Eloy Azorín, Pilar Punzano, Jordi Dauder, Leticia Dolera, among others.

== Premise ==
The fiction tracks the standoff between Mario Pastor (a gentleman thief) and Bernardo Valle (a police officer hellbent on catching him), and their respective collaborators.

== Cast ==
- José Luis García Pérez as Mario Pastor.
- Carlos Hipólito as Bernardo Valle.
- José Ángel Egido as César Ferrer.
- Eloy Azorín as Jorge Lestón.
- Pilar Punzano as Sara Martín.
- Jordi Dauder as Nicolás.
- Leticia Dolera as Rebeca Mendoza.
- Jorge Roelas as Lorenzo Cortés.
- Yolanda Ulloa as Luisa Tubío.
- Ana Risueño as Pilar Alcocer.
- Denise Maestre as Clara Pastor.
- Carlos Sampedro as Adrián Pastor.
- Carlos Rodríguez Sastre as Javier Valle.
- Bárbara Meier as Inés Valle.

== Production and release ==
Produced by Bambú Producciones, Guante blanco is based on an original idea by Ramón Campos. The writing team was formed by Campos alongside Gema R. Neira, Eligio Rodríguez, Laura León, Deborah Rope and David Ríos, whereas the episodes were directed by Carlos Sedes, Eduardo Armiñán and Jorge Sánchez-Cabezudo. Shooting began by July 2008.

The first episode was pre-screened at the 56th San Sebastián International Film Festival in September 2008.

The series debuted in prime time on 15 October 2008, earning 2,489,000 average viewers and a 15.9% audience share. The next episodes earned respectively 1,851,000 viewers and a 9.9% audience share (22 October 2008) and 1,277,000 and a 8.0% audience share (31 October 2008). The original broadcasting run on linear television was axed due to poor ratings after the third episode, leaving five unaired episodes, which were made available on the online service rtve.es. Televisión Española decided to run the full series again in prime time in 2010.

No.	Title	Original release date
1	"El Van Gogh"	15 October 2008
2	"El Stradivarius"	22 October 2008
3	"La reliquia"	31 October 2008
4	"El vino"	7 November 2008
5	"El depósito"	18 November 2008
6	"El casino"	18 November 2008
7	"La ninfa de oro"	20 November 2008
7	"El compendium"	2 December 2008
