= Carlos Hipólito =

Spanish actor

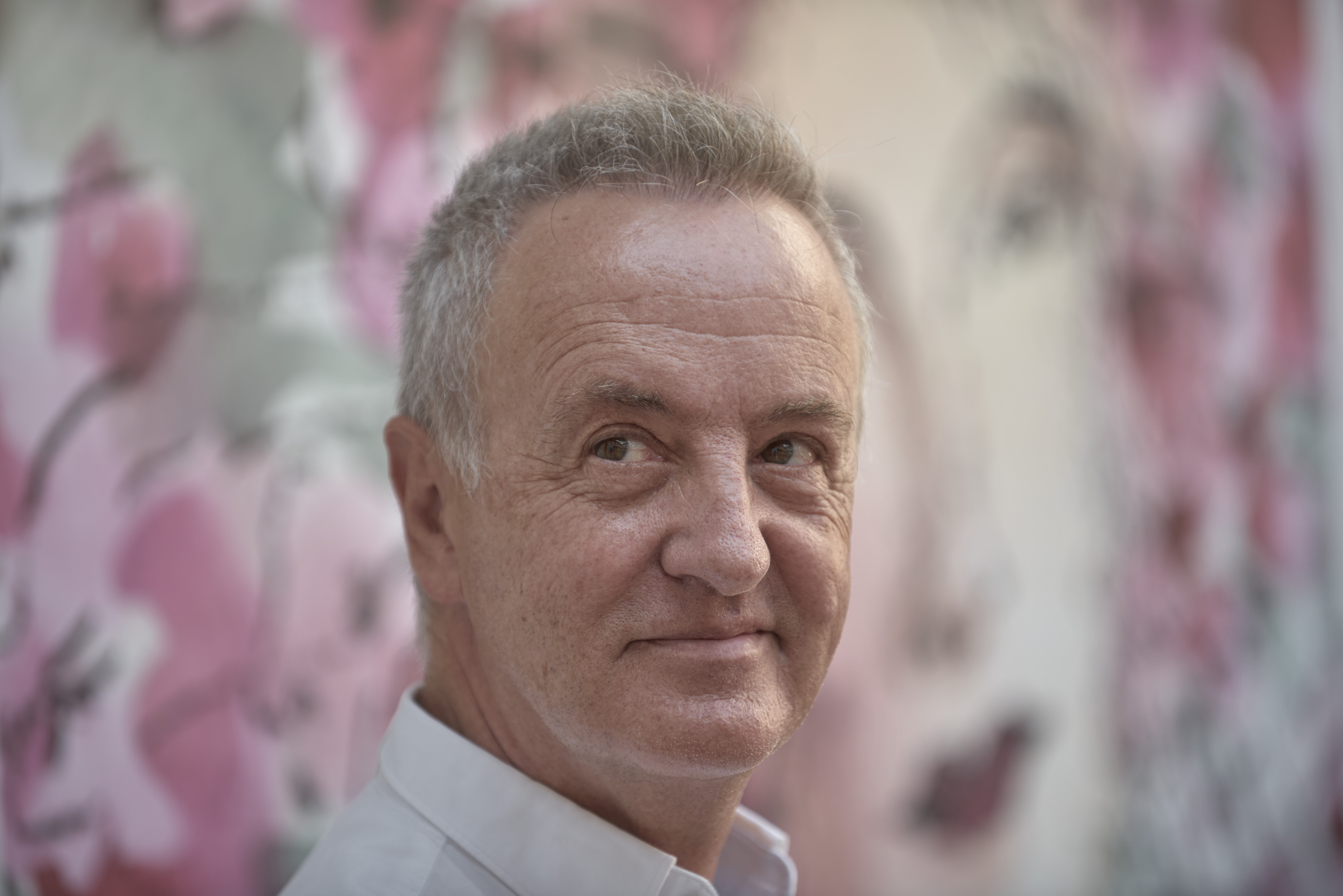
- Born: Carlos López Hipólito; 1956 (age 69–70); Madrid, Spain
- Occupation: Actor
- Spouse: Mapi Sagaseta
- Children: Elisa Hipólito

Carlos López Hipólito (born 1956), better known as Carlos Hipólito, is a Spanish actor. He has a long stage career, and is best known for his roles in the series Desaparecida, Guante blanco, Locked Up, Caronte, and Cuéntame cómo pasó.

== Biography ==
Carlol López Hipólito was born in 1956 in Madrid. He started studies in architecture but he dropped off. A theater buff since childhood due to his mother's influence, he trained his acting chops at the William Layton lab. He started his acting career in stage plays, making his professional debut in 1978.

Some of his stage performances include roles in Arte; El mètode Grönholm, Todos eran mis hijos, Follies; Don Carlos, El misántropo, El médico de su honra, Las comedias bárbaras, Historia de un caballo, El burlador de Sevilla and Dakota.

Hipólito has been a recurring face in José Luis Garci's feature films, including You're the One (2000), Story of a Kiss (2002), Tiovivo c. 1950 (2004), Ninette (2005), Sangre de mayo (2008) or Holmes & Watson. Madrid Days (2012). In 2003, he was nominated to the Goya Award for his supporting performance in Story of a Kiss.

Hipólito has performed the voiceover of Carlos Alcántara in Cuéntame cómo pasó since the beginning of the series in 2001. Many seasons after, he made an onscreen performance in Cuéntame's 21st season (released in 2021), when the timeline of the series made a leap-forward to COVID-19-struck Spain.

In 2020, he was awarded the Gold Medal of Merit in the Fine Arts.

== Personal life ==
He got married with Mapi Sagaseta, a Spanish actress, and they got a daughter in 2002, Elisa Hipólito, also an actress.

== Filmography ==
=== Film ===
Year	Title	Role	Notes	Ref.
1992	Salsa rosa (Pink Sauce)	Nel		
1992	Después del sueño	Ballesteros		
1992	Una mujer bajo la lluvia (A Woman in the Rain)	Alfonso		
1993	El pájaro de la felicidad (The Bird of Happiness)	Enrique		
1993	Mi hermano del alma (My Soul Brother)	Carlos		
1997	Hazlo por mí (Do It for Me)	Andrés Uriarte		
2000	Una historia de entonces (You're the One)			
2002	Historia de un beso (Story of a Kiss)	Julio (old)	Child version of the character played by Manuel Lozano	
2003	Cásate conmigo, Maribel	Marcelino		
2004	Tiovivo c. 1950			
2005	Ninette			
2008	Sangre de mayo (Blood in May)			
2009	Amores locos (Mad Love)	Alfonso		
2012	Holmes & Watson. Madrid Days			
2016	1898: Los últimos de Filipinas (1898, Our Last Men in the Philippines)	Rogelio Vigil de Quiñones		
2020	Explota Explota (My Heart Goes Boom!)	Ismael		

=== Television ===
Year	Title	Role	Notes	Ref.
2001–	Cuéntame cómo pasó	Carlos Alcántara	Voice of old Carlos Alcántara, primarily performed by Ricardo Gómez. Made onscreen performance in season 21.	
2007–08	Desaparecida	Alfredo		
2008	Guante blanco	Bernardo Valle		
2014	Hermanos	Antonio Torres		
2015–16	Vis a vis (Locked Up)	Leopoldo Ferreiro		
2016	El ministerio del tiempo	Philip II	Guest role. Season 2, Episode 13: "Cambio de tiempo"	
2020	Caronte	Comisario Paniagua		

== Accolades ==
Year	Award	Category	Work	Result	Ref.
1999	2nd Max Awards	Best Leading Actor	Arte	Won	
2003	17th Goya Awards	Best Supporting Actor	Story of a Kiss	Nominated	
2007	16th Actors and Actresses Union Awards	Best Stage Actor in a Leading Role	El método Grönholm	Won	
2008	17th Actors and Actresses Union Awards	Best Television Actor in a Leading Role	Desaparecida	Won	
2011	14th Max Awards	Best Leading Actor	Glengarry Glen Ross	Won	
2011	20th Actors and Actresses Union Awards	Best Stage Actor in a Leading Role	All My Sons	Won	
2013	16th Max Awards	Best Leading Actor	Follies	Won	
2015	24th Actors and Actresses Union Awards	Best Television Actor in a Minor Role	Hermanos	Won	
2017	26th Actors and Actresses Union Awards	Best Television Actor in a Minor Role	El ministerio del tiempo	Nominated	
2017	26th Actors and Actresses Union Awards	Best Film Actor in a Minor Role	1898: Los últimos de Filipinas	Nominated	
2024	32nd Actors and Actresses Union Awards	Best Stage Actor in a Leading Role	El proceso	Pending	
2026	34th Actors and Actresses Union Awards	Best Stage Actor in a Leading Role	Música para Hitler	Nominated	
