= Champions (2018 film) =

- Theatrical release poster
- Spanish: Campeones
- Directed by: Javier Fesser
- Screenplay by: David Marqués; Javier Fesser
- Story by: David Marqués
- Produced by: Gabriel Arias-Salgado; Alexandra Lebret; Álvaro Longoria; Luis Manso
- Starring: Javier Gutiérrez; Juan Margallo; Athenea Mata; Luisa Gavasa; Daniel Freire; Itziar Castro
- Cinematography: Chechu Graf
- Edited by: Roberto Bolado; Javier Fesser
- Music by: Rafael Arnau
- Production companies: Películas Pendelton; Rey de Babia AIE; Morena Films; Telefónica Studios
- Distributed by: Universal Pictures
- Release date: 6 April 2018 (Spain)
- Running time: 124 minutes
- Country: Spain
- Language: Spanish
- Budget: €4.5 million
- Box office: $23.8 million

Champions (Spanish: Campeones) is a 2018 Spanish sports comedy-drama film directed by Javier Fesser and written by Fesser and David Marqués. It was selected as the Spanish entry for the Best Foreign Language Film at the 91st Academy Awards, but it was not nominated.

== Plot ==
This movie is inspired by Aderes team in Burjassot (Valencia), a team created with people with intellectual disabilities that won twelve Spanish championships between 1999 and 2014.

Marco Montes is the assistant coach of the basketball team CB Estudiantes. He is an arrogant man with bad manners and is fired from his job after pushing the head coach during a game over a disagreement over team strategy. After driving drunk into the back of a police car, Marco is ordered to either spend two years in prison or ninety days of community service, in the form of coaching Los Amigos, a team of basketball players with disabilities. At first, Montes complains about coaching the disabled players calling them subnormales (below normal). However, as he continues to coach the team, he realizes that each of the players has a unique background and they are extremely persistent in working together and playing well.

Meanwhile, Marco and his wife Sonia are fighting with each other because Sonia wants a child and Marco is not ready yet. In particular, Iván, one of Marco's friends, meets Sonia at a bar and tells her that he is meeting with Marco over the weekend and that she can come to confront Marco then. Iván then proceeds to tell Marco that he is not going to go out with him in an attempt to get some alone time with Sonia because he finds her attractive. However, Marco still shows up and discusses with Sonia, they leave the bar still upset with each other. After Los Amigos's first away game, Marco realizes that it is incredibly difficult to travel with the team given their abrupt and often annoying interactions with the other people on public transportation. Marco tells Sonia about these difficulties, and she helps loan a camper van from her coworker at a sports gear shop. She then joins Marco and his team over several games and their relationship improves.

In the end, Los Amigos place second in the National Series, and Marco agrees to have a child with Sonia. As Marco leaves the Los Amigos team to go back to coaching professionally, he is thanked by all the team members for changing their lives.

== Cast ==
- Javier Gutiérrez as Marco Montes
- Juan Margallo as Julio
- Athenea Mata as Sonia

== Production ==
The film is a Películas Pendelton, Rey de Babia AIE, Morena Films, and Telefónica Studios production.

== Release ==
Distributed by Universal Pictures International Spain, the film was theatrically released in Spain on 6 April 2018.

== Reception ==
=== Box office ===
The film is the highest-grossing Spanish language film of 2018 in Spain, with a box-office taking of €19.1 million from 3.3 million admissions.

=== Critical response ===
Champions has an approval rating of 75% on review aggregator website Rotten Tomatoes, based on 12 reviews, and an average rating of 6.4/10.

=== Accolades ===
It was selected as the Spanish entry for the Best Foreign Language Film at the 91st Academy Awards, but it was not nominated. The film won three Goya Awards, including Best Film, Best New Actor (Jesús Vidal), and Best Original Song ("Este es el momento", by Coque Malla).
The film received five nominations for the 6th Platino Awards, including Best Ibero-American Film and Best Director.

Year	Award	Category	Nominee(s)	Result	Ref.
2019	24th Forqué Awards	Best Film		Won	
2019	24th Forqué Awards	Best Actor	Javier Gutiérrez	Nominated	
2019	6th Feroz Awards	Best Comedy Film		Won	
2019	6th Feroz Awards	Best Director	Javier Fesser	Nominated	
2019	6th Feroz Awards	Best Actor in a Film	Javier Gutiérrez	Nominated	
2019	6th Feroz Awards	Best Trailer		Nominated	
2019	33rd Goya Awards	Best Film		Won	
2019	33rd Goya Awards	Best Director	Javier Fesser	Nominated	
2019	33rd Goya Awards	Best Original Screenplay	Javier Fesser, David Marqués	Nominated	
2019	33rd Goya Awards	Best Actor	Javier Gutiérrez	Nominated	
2019	33rd Goya Awards	Best Supporting Actor	Juan Margallo	Nominated	
2019	33rd Goya Awards	Best New Actress	Gloria Ramos	Nominated	
2019	33rd Goya Awards	Best New Actor	Jesús Vidal	Won	
2019	33rd Goya Awards	Best Editing	Javier Fesser	Nominated	
2019	33rd Goya Awards	Best Production Supervision	Luis Fernández Lago	Nominated	
2019	33rd Goya Awards	Best Original Song	"Este es el momento" by Coque Malla	Won	
2019	33rd Goya Awards	Best Sound	Arman Ciudad, Charly Schmukler, Alfonso Raposo	Nominated	
2019	28th Actors and Actresses Union Awards	Best Film Actor in a Secondary Role	Juan Margallo	Won	
2019	6th Platino Awards	Best Ibero-American Film		Nominated	
2019	6th Platino Awards	Best Director	Javier Fesser	Nominated	
2019	6th Platino Awards	Best Screenplay	Javier Fesser, David Marqués	Nominated	
2019	6th Platino Awards	Best Actor	Javier Gutiérrez	Nominated	
2019	6th Platino Awards	Cinema and Education in Values		Won	

== Future ==
=== Documentary ===
A documentary called Ni distintos ni diferentes: Campeones, which tells the true stories of the protagonists of the film, premiered on November 16, 2018, in Spanish theaters.

=== Sequel ===
A sequel called Championext was released on August 18, 2023, in Spanish cinemas.

=== Remakes ===
In 2020, shooting began for an Arabic-language remake under the same name, released commercially on March 10, 2022, in theaters in Saudi Arabia.

On April 5, 2022, a German-language remake, Weil wir Champions sind, directed by Christoph Schnee was released.

On March 10, 2023, an English-language remake of the same name directed by Bobby Farrelly was released.

Sitaare Zameen Par, a Hindi-language remake starring Aamir Khan, which also serves as a spiritual sequel to his 2007 film Taare Zameen Par, released in theatres on 20 June 2025.

== See also ==
- List of Spanish films of 2018
- List of submissions to the 91st Academy Awards for Best Foreign Language Film
- List of Spanish submissions for the Academy Award for Best Foreign Language Film
