= Comandante (2003 film) =

- Directed by: Oliver Stone
- Starring: Fidel Castro
- Release date: 2003
- Country: United States

Comandante is a political documentary film by American director Oliver Stone. In the film, Stone interviews Cuban leader Fidel Castro on a diverse range of topics. Stone and his film crew visited Castro in Cuba for three days in 2002, and the film was released in 2003, having its premiere at the Sundance Film Festival early that year. The film was partly produced by HBO and was planned for broadcast. Shortly before airtime, after Cuba executed three hijackers of a ferry to the United States and imprisoned more than 70 political dissidents, HBO pulled the program. To this day, it still has not been given a video release in the USA.

== See also ==
- South of the Border – 2009 film by Oliver Stone of interviews with Venezuelan President Hugo Chavez.
- The Putin Interviews – 2017 film by Oliver Stone of interviews with Vladimir Putin, President of Russia.
