= Historias lamentables =

- Directed by: Javier Fesser
- Written by: Javier Fesser; Claro García
- Produced by: Luis Manso; Pilar Benito; Álvaro Longoria; Javier Fesser
- Cinematography: Alex Catalán
- Edited by: Mapa Pastor
- Music by: Rafael Arnau
- Production companies: Películas Pendelton; Morena Films; Unfortunate Stories AIE
- Distributed by: Amazon Prime Video
- Release date: 2020
- Language: Spanish

Historias lamentables (also known as Unfortunate Stories) is a 2020 Spanish anthology comedy film co-written and directed by Javier Fesser. It was distributed by Amazon Prime Video.

== Cast ==
- Pol López as Ramón
- Chani Martín as Bermejo
- Laura Gómez-Lacueva as Tina
- Matías Janick as Ayoub
- Alberto Castrillo-Ferrer as Alipio
- Miguel Lago Casal as José Ángel
- Chema Trujillo as Enciso
- Rosario Pardo as Rosario
- Itziar Castro as Ingrid Müller

== Production ==
The film is a Películas Pendelton, Morena Films and Unfortunate Stories AIE production, with the participation of TVE, Amazon Prime Video, and Crea SGR and support from ICAA and the Madrid regional administration.

== Reception ==
The film got three nominations at the Goya Awards and two at the Feroz Awards.
