= Javier Fesser =

Spanish film director, screenwriter and film editor

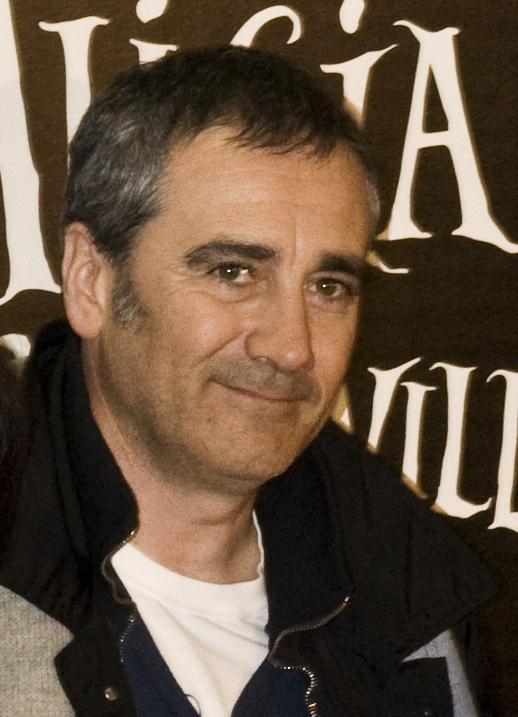
- Born: Javier Fesser Pérez de Petinto; 15 February 1964 (age 62); Madrid, Spain

Javier Fesser Pérez de Petinto (Madrid, born 15 February 1964) is a Spanish film director and publicist. He is a multiple Goya Award winner for his films Camino and Mortadelo y Filemón contra Jimmy el Cachondo, and an Academy Award nominee for his film Binta and the Great Idea.

Fesser earned his degree in Communication studies at the Universidad Complutense de Madrid. He was the founder of Línea Films in 1986.

His brother Guillermo Fesser is a famous journalist.

== Filmography ==
=== Film ===
Year	Title	Director	Writer	Producer	Editor	Notes
1998	The Miracle of P. Tinto	Yes	Yes	No	No	Also camera operator
2003	Mortadelo & Filemon: The Big Adventure	Yes	Yes	No	No	
2006	Cándida	No	Yes	Executive	No	
2008	Camino	Yes	Yes	No	Yes	
2014	Mortadelo and Filemon: Mission Implausible	Yes	Yes	No	Yes	Also animatics
2018	Champions	Yes	Yes	No	Yes	Also titles designer
2020	Historias Lamentables	Yes	Yes	Yes	No	
2023	Championext	Yes	Yes	Yes	No	

Acting roles

Year	Title	Role	Notes
1998	The Miracle of P. Tinto	Narrador NU-DO	Voice role
2003	Mortadelo & Filemon: The Big Adventure	Periodicos	Voice role
2014	Mortadelo and Filemon: Mission Implausible	Instalador de la caja fuerte/ Voz sobre el periódico	Voice role
2018	Champions	Periodista	
2020	Historias Lamentables	Comensal restaurante	

=== Documentaries ===
==== Producer ====
- Ni distintos ni diferentes: Campeones (2018)
- La vida de Brianeitor (2023)

=== Short film ===
Year	Title	Director	Writer	Editor	Notes
1994	Aquel Ritmillo	Yes	Yes	Yes	
1995	El Secdleto de la Trompeta	Yes	Yes	Yes	
2001	La Sorpresa	Yes	Yes	No	
2003	Pancho y Pincho	Yes	Yes	No	
2003	Así se hizo "Pancho y Pinchó"	Yes	Yes	No	Mockumentary short
2004	Binta and the Great Idea	Yes	Yes	Yes	Segment of El Mundo a Cada Rato
2005	La Cabina	Yes	Yes	No	
2007	Los Pinkerton	Yes	Yes	No	
2007	Vida de un Plano	Yes	Yes	No	
2010	Depresion	Yes	Yes	No	
2010	Última Voluntad	Yes	Yes	No	
2012	El Regalo	Yes	Yes	No	Co-directed with Ana Fesser
2013	Invictus: El Correo del Cesar	Yes	Yes	Yes	Advertising short
2013	Unicos	Yes	Yes	No	Segment of Al Final Todos Mueren; Also actor as "Astronauta"
2013	Dolor	Yes	Yes	Yes	
2015	Bienvenidos	Yes	Yes	Yes	
2016	De Frente	Yes	Yes	No	Co-directed with Claudia Fesser
2016	Primeros Sintomas	Yes	Story	Yes	
2016	Servicio Tecnico	Yes	Yes	Yes	
2016	17 Años Juntos	Yes	Yes	Yes	
2020	Tres Veces	Yes	Yes	No	Also actor
2020	El Monstruo Invisible	Yes	Yes	No	Documentary short Co-directed with Guillermo Fesser
2021	Cancer	Yes	Yes	Yes	
2022	Kellys	Yes	Yes	Yes	

== Bibliography ==
- Tres Días en el Valle: Mi (In)experiencia Benedictina (2005)
- Los Días de Colores (2011)

== Awards ==
Year	Work	Award	Category	Result
1995	Aquel ritmillo	Goya Awards	Best Fictional Short Film	Won
1999	The Miracle of P. Tinto	Goya Awards	Best New Director	Nominated
2005	Binta and the Great Idea	Alcalá de Henares Film Festival	Ciudad de Alcalá First Award	Won
2007	Binta and the Great Idea	Academy Awards	Best Live Action Short Film	Nominated
2008	Camino	San Sebastián International Film Festival	Golden Shell	Nominated
2009	Camino	Goya Awards	Best Director	Won
2009	Camino	Goya Awards	Best Original Screenplay	Won
2015	Mortadelo and Filemon: Mission Implausible	Forqué Awards	Best Animated Film	Won
2015	Mortadelo and Filemon: Mission Implausible	Gaudí Awards	Best Animated Film	Won
2015	Mortadelo and Filemon: Mission Implausible	Goya Awards	Best Adapted Screenplay	Won
2015	Mortadelo and Filemon: Mission Implausible	Goya Awards	Best Animated Film	Won
2015	Mortadelo and Filemon: Mission Implausible	CEC Awards	Best Adapted Screenplay	Won
2015	Mortadelo and Filemon: Mission Implausible	Platino Awards	Best Animated Film	Nominated
2015	Bienvenidos	Alcalá de Henares Film Festival	Public Award (Alcalá de Henares Youth Department of the Town Hall)	Won
2017	17 Años Juntos	Fugaz Awards	Best Screenplay	Won
2018	—N/a	Fugaz Awards	Honorary Award	Won
2019	Champions	Feroz Awards	Best Director	Nominated
2019	Champions	Goya Awards	Best Director	Nominated
2019	Champions	Goya Awards	Best Original Screenplay	Nominated
2019	Champions	Goya Awards	Best Editing	Nominated
2019	Champions	Platino Awards	Best Director	Nominated
2019	Champions	Platino Awards	Best Screenplay	Nominated
2019	Champions	Platino Awards	Cinema and Education in Values	Won
2021	Unfortunate Stories	Feroz Awards	Best Trailer	Won
2021	El Monstruo Invisible	Forqué Awards	Best Short Film	Won

== See also ==
- List of Spanish Academy Award winners and nominees
