= Goya Award for Best Special Effects =

Annual award by the Spanish Film Academy

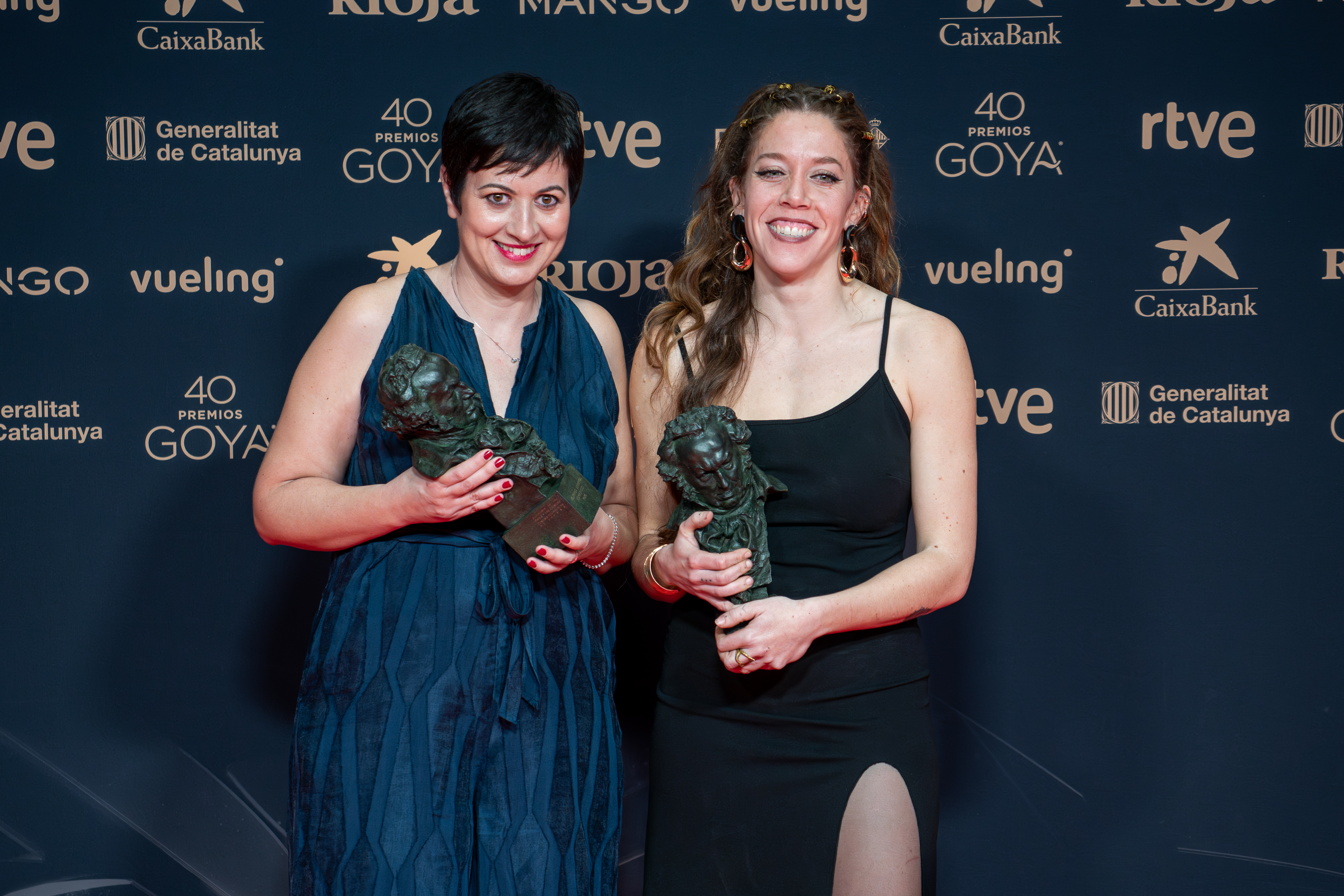
- The 2026 recipients: Ana Rubio and Paula Gallifa Rubia
- Native name: Premio Goya a los mejores efectos especiales
- Awarded for: Best special effects in a Spanish film of the year
- Country: Spain
- Presented by: Academy of Cinematographic Arts and Sciences of Spain (AACCE)
- First award: 2nd Goya Awards (1987)
- Most recent winner: Paula Gallifa Rubia, Ana Rubio; Los Tigres (2025)
- Website: Official website

The Goya Award for Best Special Effects (Spanish: Premio Goya a los mejores efectos especiales) is one of the Goya Awards presented annually by the Academy of Cinematographic Arts and Sciences of Spain (AACCE) since the second edition of the awards in 1987. Francisco Teres was the first winner of the award for his work in Anguish (1987).

Reyes Abades holds the record of the most wins for this category with nine wins followed by Félix Bergés with seven and Raúl Romanillos with six. For their work in Pan's Labyrinth (2006), David Martí and Montse Ribé won the Academy Award for Best Makeup and Hairstyling but competed and won alongside Emilio Ruiz del Río, Everett Burrell, Reyes Abades and Edward Irastorza in this category at the Goya Awards instead of Best Makeup and Hairstyles which was won by José Quetglas and Blanca Sánchez for the same film.

== Winners and nominees ==
=== 1980s ===
Year	English title	Original title	Recipient(s)
1987 (2nd)	Anguish	Angustia	Francisco Teres
1987 (2nd)	A los cuatro vientos		Julián Martín
1987 (2nd)	Descanse en piezas		John Collins
1988 (3rd)	Slugs	Slugs, Muerte Viscosa	Gonzalo Gonzalo, Basilio Cortijo and Carlos de Marchis
1988 (3rd)	El Dorado		Reyes Abades
1988 (3rd)	Women on the Verge of a Nervous Breakdown	Mujeres al borde de un ataque de nervios	Reyes Abades
1988 (3rd)	Rowing with the Wind	Remando al viento	Reyes Abades
1988 (3rd)	El Lute II: Tomorrow I'll be Free	El Lute II: mañana seré libre	Alberto Nombela
1989 (4th)	The Rift	La grieta	Colin Arthur, Basilio Cortijo and Carlos de Marchis
1989 (4th)	Moon Child	El niño de la luna	Ángel Alonso, Basilio Cortijo, Emilio Ruiz del Río and Reyes Abades
1989 (4th)	Twisted Obsession	El sueño del mono loco	Christian Bourqui
1989 (4th)	The Dark Night	La noche oscura	Reyes Abades
1989 (4th)	The Things of Love	Las cosas del querer	Reyes Abades

=== 1990s ===
Year	English title	Original title	Recipient(s)
1990 (5th)	¡Ay Carmela!		Reyes Abades
1990 (5th)	Don Juan, My Dear Ghost	Don Juan, mi querido fantasma	Carlos Santos and Juan Ramón Molina
1990 (5th)	Letters from Alou	Las cartas de Alou	Reyes Abades and Juan Ramón Molina
1991 (6th)	Prince of Shadows	Beltenebros	Reyes Abades
1991 (6th)	Capitan Escalaborns		Carlo de Marchis
1991 (6th)	Anything for Bread	Todo por la pasta	Kit West
1992 (7th)	Acción mutante		Olivier Gleyze, Yves Domenjoud, Jean-Baptiste Bonetto, Bernard Andre Le Boette, Emilio Ruiz del Río and Hipólito Cantero
1992 (7th)	Too Much Heart	Demasiado corazón	Lee Wilson
1992 (7th)	Vacas		Reyes Abades
1993 (8th)	The Dead Mother	La madre muerta	Hipólito Cantero
1993 (8th)	Madregilda		Reyes Abades
1993 (8th)	Kika		Jean-Baptiste Bonetto, Olivier Gleyre and Yves Domenjoud
1994 (9th)	Running Out of Time	Días contados	Reyes Abades
1994 (9th)	Desvío al paraíso		Michael Kirton
1994 (9th)	El detective y la muerte		Miroslaw Marchwinski
1995 (10th)	The Day of the Beast	El día de la bestia	Reyes Abades, Juan Tominic and Manuel Horrillo
1995 (10th)	El niño invisible		Juan Ramón Molina, Juan Tomicic and Manuel Horrillo
1995 (10th)	The City of Lost Children	La Cité des enfants perdus	Jean-Baptiste Bonetto, Jean-Christophe Spadaccini, Olivier Gleyze and Yves Domenjoud
1996 (11th)	Earth	Tierra	Reyes Abades and Ignacio Sanz Pastor
1996 (11th)	Killer Tongue	La lengua asesina	Jonathan Stuart, Marcus Wookey and Patrick Vigne
1996 (11th)	Libertarias		Reyes Abades
1997 (12th)	Airbag		Juan Ramón Molina
1997 (12th)	The Chambermaid on the Titanic		Roberto Ricci
1997 (12th)	Comanche Territory	Territorio Comanche	Reyes Abades and Emilio Ruiz del Río
1998 (13th)	The Miracle of P. Tinto	El milagro de P. Tinto	Raúl Romanillos and Félix Bergés
1998 (13th)	Open Your Eyes	Abre los ojos	Reyes Abades, Alberto Esteban and Aurelio Sánchez
1998 (13th)	A Time for Defiance	La hora de los valientes	Juan Ramón Molina and Alfonso Nieto
1998 (13th)	The Girl of Your Dreams	La niña de tus ojos	Emilio Ruiz del Río and Alfonso Nieto
1999 (14th)	Nobody Knows Anybody	Nadie conoce nadie	Raúl Romanillos, Manuel Horrillo and José Núñez
1999 (14th)	Goya in Bordeaux	Goya en Burdeos	Fabrizio Storaro and Reyes Abades
1999 (14th)	The City of Marvels	La ciudad de los prodigios	Reyes Abades, Hipólito Cantero and José María Aragonés
1999 (14th)	The Ugliest Woman in the World	La mujer más fea del mundo	Alejandro Álvarez, David Martí, José Álvarez and Reyes Abades

=== 2000s ===
Year	English title	Original title	Recipient(s)
2000 (15th)	Common Wealth	La comunidad	Félix Bergés, Raúl Romanillos, Pau Costa and Julio Navarro
2000 (15th)	The Year of Maria	Año mariano	Juan Ramón Molina and Alfonso Nieto
2000 (15th)	The Art of Dying	El arte de morir	Reyes Abades and Félix Bergés
2000 (15th)	Masterpiece	Obra maestra	Emilio Ruiz del Río, Alfonso Nieto, Raúl Romanillos and Pau Costa
2001 (16th)	Buñuel y la mesa del rey Salomón		Reyes Abades, José María Aragonés, Carlos Martínez, Ana Núñez and Antonio Ojeda
2001 (16th)	Intacto		Raúl Romanillos, Pau Costa, Félix Bergés, Carlos Martínez, Antonio Ojeda and Ana Núñez
2001 (16th)	The Devil's Backbone	El espinazo del diablo	Reyes Abades, Carmen Aguirre, David Martí, Alfonso Nieto, Montse Ribé and Emilio Ruiz del Río
2001 (16th)	The Others	Los otros	Félix Bergés, Derek Langley, Pedro Moreno and Rafael Solórzano
2002 (17th)	800 Bullets	800 Balas	Juan Ramón Molina, Félix Bergés and Rafael Solórzano
2002 (17th)	The Biggest Robbery Never Told	El robo más grande jamás contado	Raúl Romanillos, Félix Bergés and Carlos Martínez
2002 (17th)	Guerreros		Aurelio Sánchez-Herrera, Emilio Ruiz del Río and Reyes Abades
2002 (17th)	Talk to Her	Hable con ella	David Martí, Montse Ribé and Jorge Calvo
2003 (18th)	Mortadelo & Filemon: The Big Adventure	La gran aventura de Mortadelo y Filemón	Raúl Romanillos, Pau Costa, Julio Navarro and Félix Bergés
2003 (18th)	South from Granada	Al sur de Granada	Reyes Abades, Alfonso Nieto and Pablo Núñez
2003 (18th)	Soldiers of Salamina	Soldados de Salamina	Pedro Moreno, Alfonso Nieto and Emilio Ruiz del Río
2003 (18th)	El refugio del mal		Reyes Abades, Jesús Pascual, José Rossi and José María Remacha
2004 (19th)	The Wolf	El Lobo	Reyes Abades, Jesús Pascual and Ramón Lorenzo
2004 (19th)	Crimen Ferpecto		Félix Bernés and Juan Ramón Molina
2004 (19th)	Romasanta	Romasanta, la caza de la bestia	David Martí, José María Aragonés, Juan Ramón Molina and Montse Ribé
2004 (19th)	Torapia		Aurelio Sánchez Herrera, Eduardo Acosta and Juan Ramón Molina
2005 (20th)	Fragile	Frágiles	David Martí, Montse Ribé, Félix Cordón, Félix Bergés and Rafael Solórzano
2005 (20th)	Las llaves de la independencia		Ana Núñez, Antonio Ojeda, Carlos Martínez, Juan Ramón Molina and Pablo Núñez
2005 (20th)	Obaba		Alberto Esteban, José María Remacha, Pablo Urrutia and Reyes Abades
2005 (20th)	Un rey en la Habana		Alberto Esteban, Ana Núñez, Carlos Lozano, Pablo Núñez and Reyes Abades
2006 (21st)	Pan's Labyrinth	El laberinto del fauno	David Martí, Montse Ribé, Reyes Abades, Everett Burrell, Edward Irastorza and Emilio Ruiz del Río
2006 (21st)	Goya's Ghosts	Los fantasmas de Goya	Reyes Abades, Félix Bergés and Eduardo Díaz
2006 (21st)	Alatriste		Reyes Abades and Rafael Solórzano
2006 (21st)	Salvador (Puig Antich)		Juan Ramón Molina and Ferrán Piquer
2007 (22nd)	The Orphanage	El orfanato	David Martí, Montse Ribé, Pau Costa, Enric Martí, Lluis Castells and Jordi San Agustín
2007 (22nd)	The Heart of the Earth	El corazón de la tierra	Reyes Abades and Álex G. Ortoll
2007 (22nd)	13 Roses	Las 13 Rosas	Carlos Lozano, Pau Costa and Raúl Romanillos
2007 (22nd)	[•REC]		David Ambit, Enric Masip and Álex Villagrasa
2008 (23rd)	Mortadelo and Filemon. Mission: Save the Planet	Mortadelo y Filemón. Misión: salvar la Tierra	Raúl Romanillos, Pau Costa, José Quetglas, Eduardo Díaz, Álex Grau and Chema Remacha
2008 (23rd)	Camino		Arturo Balseiro, Ferrán Piquer and Raúl Romanillos
2008 (23rd)	Sangre de mayo		Alberto Nombela and Juan Ramón Molina
2008 (23rd)	Just Walking	Sólo quiero caminar	Alejandro Vázquez, Rafa Solórzano and Reyes Abades
2009 (24th)	Agora	Ágora	Cris Reynolds and Félix Bergés
2009 (24th)	Cell 211	Celda 211	Raúl Romanillos and Guillermo Orbe
2009 (24th)	[•REC]²		Salvador Santana and Àlex Villagrasa
2009 (24th)	Spanish Movie		Pau Costa and Lluís Castells

=== 2010s ===
Year	English title	Original title	Recipient(s)
2010 (25th)	The Last Circus	Balada triste de trompeta	Reyes Abades and Ferrán Piquer
2010 (25th)	Buried (Enterrado)		Gabriel Paré and Álex Villagrasa
2010 (25th)	Lope		Raúl Romanillos and Marcelo Siqueira
2010 (25th)	Even the Rain	También la lluvia	Gustavo Harry Farias and Juanma Nogales
2011 (26th)	EVA		Arturo Balseiro and Lluis Castells
2011 (26th)	Intruders		Raúl Romanillos and David Heras Luengo
2011 (26th)	The Skin I Live In	La piel que habito	Reyes Abades and Eduardo Díaz
2011 (26th)	No Rest for the Wicked	No habrá paz para los malvados	Raúl Romanillos and Chema Remacha
2012 (27th)	The Impossible	Lo impossible	Pau Costa and Félix Bergés
2012 (27th)	Blancanieves		Reyes Abades and Ferran Piquer
2012 (27th)	Unit 7	Grupo 7	Pedro Moreno and Juan Ventura
2012 (27th)	Invader	Invasor	Reyes Abades and Isidro Jiménez
2013 (28th)	Witching & Bitching	Las brujas de Zugarramurdi	Juan Ramón Molina and Ferrán Piquer
2013 (28th)	Family United	La gran familia española	Juan Ramón Molina and Juan Ventura Pecellín
2013 (28th)	The Last Days	Los últimos días	Lluís Rivera and Juanma Nogales
2013 (28th)	Zip & Zap and the Marble Gang	Zipi y Zape y el club de la canica	Endre Korda and Félix Bergés
2014 (29th)	El Niño		Guillermo Orbe and Raúl Romanillos
2014 (29th)	Torrente 5: Operación Eurovegas		Antonio Molina and Ferrán Piquer
2014 (29th)	Open Windows		Raúl Romanillos and David Heras
2014 (29th)	Marshland	La isla mínima	Pedro Moreno and Juan Ventura
2015 (30th)	Spy Time	Anacleto: agente secreto	Lluís Rivera and Lluís Castells
2015 (30th)	Retribution	El desconocido	Pau Costa and Isidro Jiménez
2015 (30th)	My Big Night	Mi gran noche	Juan Ramón Molina and Curro Muñoz
2015 (30th)	Breathless Time	Tiempo sin aire	Reyes Abades and Curro Muñoz
2016 (31st)	A Monster Calls	Un monstruo viene a verme	Pau Costa and Félix Bergés
2016 (31st)	1898, Our Last Men in the Philippines	1898, Los últimos de Filipinas	Pau Costa and Carlos Lozano
2016 (31st)	Guernica	Gernika	David Heras and Raúl Romanillos
2016 (31st)	Julieta		Reyes Abades and Eduardo Díaz
2017 (32nd)	Giant	Handia	Jon Serrano and David Heras
2017 (32nd)	Gold	Oro	Reyes Abades and Isidro Jiménez
2017 (32nd)	Verónica		Raúl Romanillos and David Heras
2017 (32nd)	Rescue Under Fire	Zona hostil	Reyes Abades and Curro Muñoz
2018 (33rd)	Superlópez		Lluís Rivera and Laura Pedro
2018 (33rd)	The Realm	El reino	Óscar Abades and Helmuth Barnert
2018 (33rd)	Errementari: The Blacksmith and the Devil	Errementari (el herrero y el diablo)	Jon Serrano and David Heras
2018 (33rd)	Gun City	La sombra de la ley	Lluís Rivera and Félix Bergés
2019 (34th)	The Platform	El hoyo	Mario Campoy and Iñaki Madariaga
2019 (34th)	The Endless Trench	La trinchera infinita	Jon Serrano and David Heras
2019 (34th)	While at War	Mientras dure a guerra	Raúl Romanillos and Juanma Nogales
2019 (34th)	Perdiendo el este		Juan Ramón Molina and Félix Berges

=== 2020s ===
Year	English title	Original title	Recipient(s)
2020 (35th)	Coven	Akelarre	Mariano García Marty and Ana Rubio
2020 (35th)	Black Beach		Raúl Romanillos and Jean-Louis Billard
2020 (35th)	Historias lamentables		Raúl Romanillos and Míriam Piquer
2020 (35th)	Unknown Origins	Orígenes secretos	Lluis Rivera Jove and Helmuth Barnerth
2021 (36th)	The Vault	Way Down	Pau Costa and Laura Pedro
2021 (36th)	The Good Boss	El buen patrón	Raúl Romanillos and Míriam Piquer
2021 (36th)	The Grandmother	La abuela	Raúl Romanillos and Ferran Piquer
2021 (36th)	Mediterraneo: The Law of the Sea	Mediterráneo	Àlex Villagrasa
2022 (37th)	Prison 77	Modelo 77	Esther Ballesteros, Ana Rubio
2022 (37th)	13 Exorcisms	13 exorcismos	Mariano García Marty, Jordi Costa
2022 (37th)	The Beasts	As bestas	Óscar Abades, Ana Rubio
2022 (37th)	Irati		Jon Serrano, David Heras
2022 (37th)	Valley of the Dead	Malnazidos	Lluís Rivera, Laura Pedro
2023 (38th)	Society of the Snow	La sociedad de la nieve	Pau Costa, Félix Bergés, Laura Pedro
2023 (38th)	20,000 Species of Bees	20.000 especies de abejas	Mariano García Marty, Jon Serrano, David Heras, Fran Belda, Indira Martín
2023 (38th)	Valle de sombras		Raúl Romanillos, Míriam Piquer
2023 (38th)	The Chapel	La ermita	Eneritz Zapiain, Iñaki Gil "Ketxu"
2023 (38th)	Tin & Tina		Mariano García Marty, Jon Serrano, Juan Ventura, Amparo Martínez
2024 (39th)	The 47	El 47	Laura Canals, Iván López Hernández
2024 (39th)	Dragonkeeper	Dragonkeeper: Guardiana de dragones	Li Xin
2024 (39th)	Undercover	La infiltrada	Mariano García Marty, Jon Serrano, Juliana Lasunción
2024 (39th)	The Red Virgin	La virgen roja	Raúl Romanillos, Juanma Nogales
2024 (39th)	Marco, the Invented Truth	Marco, la verdad inventada	Jon Serrano, Mariano García Marty, David Heras
2025 (40th)	Los Tigres		Paula Gallifa Rubia, Ana Rubio
2025 (40th)	Enemies	Enemigos	César Moreno, Ana Rubio, Juanma Nogales
2025 (40th)	Gaua		Jon Serrano, Mariano García Marty; David Heras; Iñaki Gil "Ketxu"
2025 (40th)	Sirāt		Pep Claret, Benjamín Ageorges
2025 (40th)	She Walks in Darkness	Un fantasma en la batalla	Jon Serrano, Mariano García Marty, Laura Pedro
