= 21st Goya Awards =

- Date: 28 January 2007
- Site: Palacio Municipal de Congresos de Madrid
- Hosted by: José Corbacho
- Organized by: Academy of Cinematographic Arts and Sciences of Spain

Highlights
- Best Film: Volver
- Best Actor: Juan Diego; Go Away from Me
- Best Actress: Penélope Cruz; Volver
- Most awards: Pan's Labyrinth (7)
- Most nominations: Alatriste (15)

Television coverage
- Network: La 1
- Viewership: 3.28 million (20.5%)

The 21st Goya Awards ceremony, presented by the Academy of Cinematographic Arts and Sciences of Spain, took place at the Palacio Municipal de Congresos y Exposiciones in Madrid on 28 January 2007. The gala was hosted by José Corbacho.

Volver won 5 awards, including those for Best Film, Best Director, Best Actress and Best Supporting Actress.

== Background ==
The nominations were read by Pilar López de Ayala and Juan Jose Ballesta on 18 December 2006.

Hosted by José Corbacho, the gala featured the musical performance of Estrella Morente, who sang "Estrella". The linear television broadcast on La 1 drew 3,282,000 viewers (20.5% share).

== Winners and nominees ==
The winners and nominees are listed as follows:

Best Film: Volver; Alatriste; Pan's Labyrinth; Salvador (Puig Antich)	Best Director: Pedro Almodóvar – Volver; Agustín Díaz Yanes – Alatriste; Guillermo del Toro – Pan's Labyrinth; Manuel Huerga – Salvador (Puig Antich)
Best Actor: Juan Diego – Go Away from Me; Daniel Brühl – Salvador (Puig Antich); Sergi López – Pan's Labyrinth; Viggo Mortensen – Alatriste	Best Actress: Penélope Cruz – Volver; Silvia Abascal – The Idiot Maiden; Marta Etura – Dark Blue Almost Black; Maribel Verdú – Pan's Labyrinth
Best Supporting Actor: Antonio de la Torre – Dark Blue Almost Black; Leonardo Sbaraglia – Salvador (Puig Antich); Juan Echanove – Alatriste; Juan Diego Botto – Go Away from Me	Best Supporting Actress: Carmen Maura – Volver; Ariadna Gil – Alatriste; Lola Dueñas – Volver; Blanca Portillo – Volver
Best Original Screenplay: Guillermo del Toro – Pan's Labyrinth; Pedro Almodóvar –Volver; Daniel Sánchez Arévalo –Dark Blue Almost Black; Jorge Sánchez-Cabezudo –The Night of the Sunflowers	Best Adapted Screenplay: Lluís Arcarazo – Salvador (Puig Antich); Agustín Díaz Yanes – Alatriste; Antonio Soler – Summer Rain; José Luis Cuerda – The Education of Fairies
Best New Actor: Quim Gutiérrez – Dark Blue Almost Black; Alberto Amarilla – Summer Rain; Javier Cifrián – The Near East; Walter Vidarte – The Night of the Sunflowers	Best New Actress: Ivana Baquero – Pan's Labyrinth; Bebe – The Education of Fairies; Verónica Echegui – My Name Is Juani; Adriana Ugarte – Doghead
Best Spanish Language Foreign Film: The Hands · Argentina; American Visa · Bolivia; En la cama · Chile; A Ton of Luck · Colombia	Best European Film: The Queen · United Kingdom; Copying Beethoven · United Kingdom; Scoop · United Kingdom; The Wind That Shakes the Barley · Ireland
Best New Director: Daniel Sánchez Arévalo – Dark Blue Almost Black; Carlos Iglesias – Crossing Borders; Javier Rebollo – Lola; Jorge Sánchez-Cabezudo – The Night of the Sunflowers	Best Animated Film: El Ratón Pérez; De profundis; El cubo mágico; Teo, cazador intergaláctico
Best Cinematography: Guillermo Navarro – Pan's Labyrinth; Paco Femenía – Alatriste; David Omedes – Salvador (Puig Antich); José Luis Alcaine – Volver	Best Editing: Bernat Vilaplana – Pan's Labyrinth; José Salcedo – Alatriste; Iván Aledo – The Borgia; Santy Borricón, Aixalá – Salvador (Puig Antich)
Best Art Direction: Benjamín Fernández – Alatriste; Bárbara Pérez Solero, Maria Stilde Ambruzzi – The Borgia; Eugenio Caballero – Pan's Labyrinth; Salvador Parra – Volver	Best Production Supervision: Cristina Zumárraga – Alatriste; Bernat Elías – Salvador (Puig Antich); Antonio Norella – Volver; Eduardo Santana, Ricardo García Arrojo, Guido Simonetti – The Borgia
Best Sound: Miguel Polo, Martín Hernández – Pan's Labyrinth; Pierre Gamet, Dominique Hennequin, Patrice Grisolet – Alatriste; Alastair Widgery, David Calleja, James Muñoz – Salvador (Puig Antich); Miguel Rejas, José Antonio Bermúdez, Manuel Laguna, Diego Garrido – Volver	Best Special Effects: David Martí, Montse Ribé, Reyes Abades, Everett Burrell, Edward Irastorza, Emilio Ruiz del Río – Pan's Labyrinth; Reyes Abades, Rafael Solórzano – Alatriste; Reyes Abades, Félix Bergés, Eduardo Díaz – Goya's Ghosts; Juan Ramón Molina, Ferrán Piquer – Salvador (Puig Antich)
Best Costume Design: Francesca Sartori – Alatriste; Luciano Capozzi – The Borgia; Yvonne Blake – Goya's Ghosts; Bina Daigeler – Volver	Best Makeup and Hairstyles: José Quetglas, Blanca Sánchez – Pan's Labyrinth; José Luis Pérez – Alatriste; Ivana Primorac, Susana Sánchez, Manuel García, María Carmen Clavel, Mercedes Guillot – Goya's Ghosts; Ana Lozano, Massimo Gattabrusi – Volver
Best Original Score: Alberto Iglesias – Volver; Roque Baños – Alatriste; Javier Navarrete – Pan's Labyrinth; Lluís Llach – Salvador (Puig Antich)	Best Original Song: Bebe, Lucio Godoy for "Tiempo pequeño" – The Education of Fairies; Alba Gárate for "Imaginarte" – Dark Blue Almost Black; Javier Limón, Andrés Calamaro, David Trueba for "Duermen los niños" – Welcome Home; Juan Bardem, Qazi Abdur Rahim for "Shockal Fire Ashe" – The Near East
Best Fictional Short Film: A ciegas...; Contracuerpo; Equipajes; La guerra; Propiedad privada	Best Animated Short Film: El viaje de Said; Another Way to Fly; Broken Wire; Hasta la muerte; La noche de los feos
Best Documentary Film: Cineastas en acción; Hécuba, un sueño de pasión; La silla de Fernando; Más allá del espejo	Best Documentary Short Film: Castañuela 70, el teatro prohibido; Abandonatii; Casting; Joe K; La Serenissima

=== Films with multiple nominations and awards ===
Films with multiple nominations
Nominations	Film
15	Alatriste
14	Volver
13	Pan's Labyrinth
11	Salvador (Puig Antich)
6	Dark Blue Almost Black
4	The Borgia
3	The Night of the Sunflowers
3	The Education of Fairies
3	Goya's Ghosts
2	Go Away from Me
2	Summer Rain
2	The Near East

Films with multiple awards
Awards	Film
7	Pan's Labyrinth
5	Volver
3	Dark Blue Almost Black
3	Alatriste
2	Seven Billiard Tables
2	Under the Stars
2	Rec

== Honorary Goya ==
Producer Tedy Villalba was the recipient of the Honorary Goya Award.
