= 16th Actors and Actresses Union Awards =

2007 Spanish award ceremony

- Date: 12 February 2007
- Site: Palacio Municipal de Congresos, Madrid, Spain
- Hosted by: Jorge Bosso
- Organized by: Actors and Actresses Union

Highlights
- Honorary career award: Nuria Espert

The 16th Actors and Actresses Union Awards ceremony was held on 12 February 2007 in Madrid's Palacio Municipal de Congresos. Directed by Mariano de Paco and written by Mariano de Paco, Ignacio García May and Ainhoa Amestoy, the gala was hosted by Jorge Bosso.

In addition to the competitive awards, the association 'Nuestras hijas de regreso a casa' received the 'Mujeres en Unión' award, Matilde Conesa the 'Una vida de doblaje' award, whereas Nuria Espert scooped the 'Toda una vida' career award. The Special Award went to the specialized bookshop Ocho y Medio.

== Winners and nominees ==
The winners and nominees are listed as follows:

=== Film ===
Best Male Performance in a Leading Role: Juan Diego — Go Away from Me; Daniel Brühl — Salvador; Sergi López — Pan's Labyrinth	Best Female Performance in a Leading Role: Penélope Cruz — Volver; Marta Etura — Dark Blue Almost Black; Maribel Verdú — Pan's Labyrinth
Best Male Performance in a Secondary Role: Antonio de la Torre — Dark Blue Almost Black; Juan Diego Botto — Go Away from Me; Héctor Colomé — Dark Blue Almost Black	Best Female Performance in a Secondary Role: Blanca Portillo — Volver; Lola Dueñas — Volver; Carmen Maura — Volver
Best Male Performance in a Minor Role: Manuel Morón — The Night of the Sunflowers; Javier Cámara — Alatriste; Roberto Enríquez — The Borgia	Best Female Performance in a Minor Role: Chus Lampreave — Volver; Ingrid Rubio — Salvador; Ana Wagener — Dark Blue Almost Black

=== Television ===
Best Male Performance in a Leading Role: José Luis Gil — Aquí no hay quien viva; Imanol Arias — Cuéntame; Paco Tous — Los hombres de Paco	Best Female Performance in a Leading Role: Chiqui Fernández — Mujeres; Ruth Núñez — Yo soy Bea; Ana Otero — Amar en tiempos revueltos
Best Male Performance in a Secondary Role: Mariano Peña — Aída; Roberto Cairo — Cuéntame; Patxi Freytez — El comisario	Best Female Performance in a Secondary Role: Inma Cuevas — Mujeres; Teresa Lozano — Mujeres; Ana Goya — Agitación + IVA
Best Male Performance in a Minor Role: Víctor Clavijo — Mujeres; Joaquín Climent — El comisario; Quique Hernández — Vientos de agua	Best Female Performance in a Minor Role: Gracia Olayo — Mujeres; Isabel Brazales — Aída; Lluvia Rojo — Cuéntame

=== Theatre ===
Best Male Performance in a Leading Role: Carlos Hipólito — El método Grönholm; Rubén Ochandiano — Right You Are (if you think so); Vicente Colomar — El maestro de danzar	Best Female Performance in a Leading Role: Cristina Marcos — El método Grönholm; Julieta Serrano — Right You Are (if you think so); Montserrat Carulla — Barcelona, mapa d'ombres
Best Male Performance in a Secondary Role: Jorge Calvo — Right You Are (if you think so); Manuel Aguilar — El mágico prodigioso; Miguel del Arco — The Producers	Best Female Performance in a Secondary Role: Mélida Molina — Right You Are (if you think so); Berta Gómez — Sálvese quien pueda; Maya Reyes— El maestro de danzar
Best Male Performance in a Minor Role: Eleazar Ortiz — El método Grönholm; Aitor Tejada — The Good Person of Szechwan; Rafael Ramos de Castro — El maestro de danzar	Best Female Performance in a Minor Role: Arantxa Aranguren — Right You Are (if you think so); Ione Irazabal — Don Gil de las calzas verdes; Gemma Solé — El maestro de danzar

=== Newcomers ===
Best New Actor: Raúl Arévalo — Dark Blue Almost Black; Quim Gutiérrez — Dark Blue Almost Black; Javier Cifrián — The Near East	Best New Actress: Ivana Baquero — Pan's Labyrinth; Verónica Echegui — My Name Is Juani; Belén López — The Distance
