= De Profundis =

De profundis refers to Psalm 130 (129 in the Vulgate), traditionally known as the De profundis ("Out of the depths") from its opening words in Latin.

De profundis may also refer to:

== Films ==
- De Profundis, an animated film by Miguelanxo Prado
- De Profundis, a 1990 Italian film directed by Luigi Cozzi, whose title was later changed to The Black Cat
- the German title of the 1919 film Out of the Depths

== Music ==
- De Profundis, a grand-motet by J.-B. Lully, 1683
- De Profundis, 7 settings by Marc-Antoine Charpentier, H.156 (1670), H.189 (1683), H.212 (1690), H.213 - H.213 a (1690), H.232 ( ?), H.211 (1690), H.222 (1690).
- De Profundis S.23 (1689, remodeled in 1720) by Michel-Richard Delalande
- De Profundis (1704) by Henry Desmarest
- De Profundis C.117, a grand-motet by Louis-Nicolas Clérambault
- De Profundis (Pärt), a composition by Arvo Pärt for men's voices, percussion (ad lib.) and organ, 1980
  - De Profundis (ballet), a ballet by J. Lang (2007) to Arvo Pärt's composition; see Colorado Ballet
- De Profundis (Vader album), 1995
- De Profundis (After Crying album), 1996
- De Profundis (PMM album), 2005
- De Profundis (Pizzetti), a musical work by Ildebrando Pizzetti
- De Profundis, a composition for male voice choir by Leevi Madetoja, 1925
- De Profundis, a piano composition with orchestra by Franz Liszt
- De Profundis, a piano sonata by Boris Arapov
- De Profundis, a composition by Frederic Rzewski for solo piano
- "De Profundis", a song by Dead Can Dance
- "De Profundis", a song from The Wild Hunt (Watain album) (2013)
- De Profundis, a British death metal band
- De Profundis, an album by The Cracow Klezmer Band
- De Profundis, a symphony by Heinz Winbeck
- De Profundis, the 2nd symphony composed by Gustavo Becerra-Schmidt
- De Profundis, a piece composed by Patrick Cassidy (composer) in his album Famine Remembrance (1997).

== Literature ==
- De Profundis (letter), an 1897 work written by Oscar Wilde during his imprisonment, in the form of a letter to Lord Alfred Douglas
- "De Profundis", a poem by Federico García Lorca, set to music in the first movement of Shostakovich's Symphony No. 14
- "De Profundis", a 1998 poem by Regina Derieva
- "De Profundis", an 1876 poem by Christina Rossetti
- "De Profundis", a poem by J. Slauerhoff in the 1928 collection Eldorado
- "De Profundis", a short story by Arthur Conan Doyle written in 1892
- "AMERICA '62: De Profundis", a 2007 prose piece by Panos Ioannides
- Suspiria de Profundis, a collection of essays by Thomas De Quincey

== Other uses ==
- De Profundis (role-playing game), a tabletop role-playing game
- De Profundis Stone, a recumbent stone in County Westmeath, Ireland at which funeral processions halted to recite the psalm

== See also ==
- Out of the Depths (disambiguation)
