= Chasing Wonders =

2020 drama film

- Directed by: Paul Meins
- Screenplay by: Judy Morris
- Produced by: Anna Vincent; Stewart Le Marechal; Anna Mohr-Pietsch; Hilton Nathanson; Louise Nathanson
- Starring: Paz Vega; Edward James Olmos; Quim Gutierrez; Carmen Maura; Antonio de la Torre
- Production companies: Arclight Films; Hianlo Films; South Australian Film Corporation; Met Film; SLA Films
- Distributed by: Gravitas Ventures
- Release date: 23 October 2020 (Adelaide)
- Running time: 86 minutes
- Country: United Kingdom
- Language: English

Chasing Wonders is a 2020 British coming-of-age drama film directed by Paul Meins, from a screenplay by Judy Morris. The film stars Paz Vega, Edward James Olmos, Quim Gutierrez, Carmen Maura, and Antonio de la Torre.

== Cast ==
- Paz Vega as Adrianna
- Edward James Olmos as Luis
- Quim Gutiérrez as Goyo
- Carmen Maura as Maribel
- Antonio de la Torre as Felipe
- Jessica Marais as Janine
- Michael Crisafulli as Savino

== Production ==
In March 2021, it was announced that Gravitas Ventures acquired the North America distribution rights to the film. The film was shot in Australia and Spain over a five-year period.

== Release ==
The film had its worldwide premiere at the Adelaide Film Festival on 23 October 2020. The film was selected for the Gold Coast Film Festival, where it screened in April 2021.

== Reception ==
On review aggregator website Rotten Tomatoes, the film has an approval rating of 64% based on 11 reviews, with an average rating of 6/10.

Richard Roeper of the Chicago Sun-Times said that "[the film is] sometimes visually arresting, the story filmed in Australia and Spain comes to a conclusion that seems contrived and forced".

Tyler Sear of The Hollywood Insider called Chasing Wonders "a hidden gem", adding that it have a "beautiful story of love, family, and unity".
