= La Caleta, Spain =

Beach of Cádiz, Spain

Coordinates: 36°31′49″N 6°18′21″W

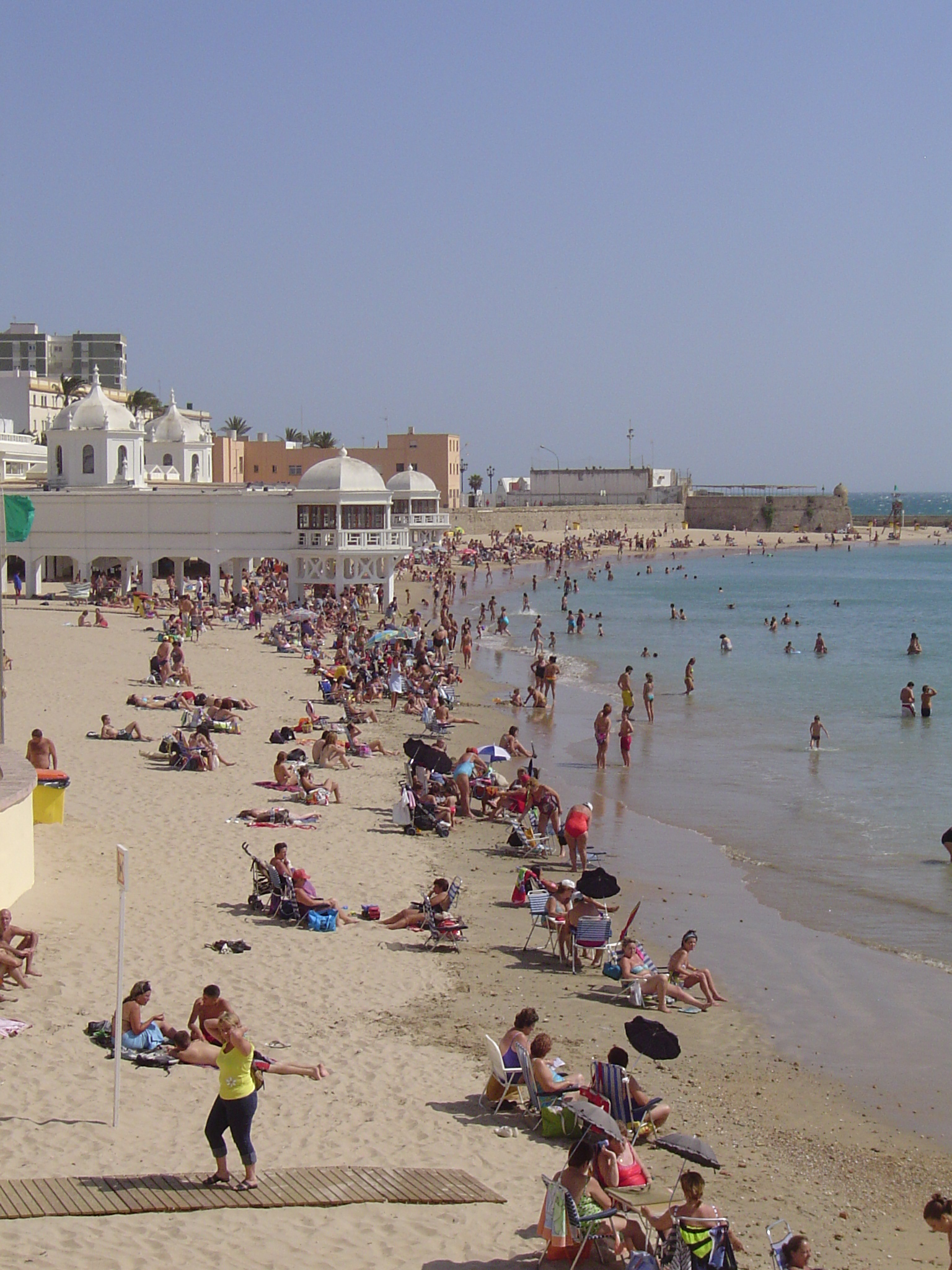
La Caleta beach

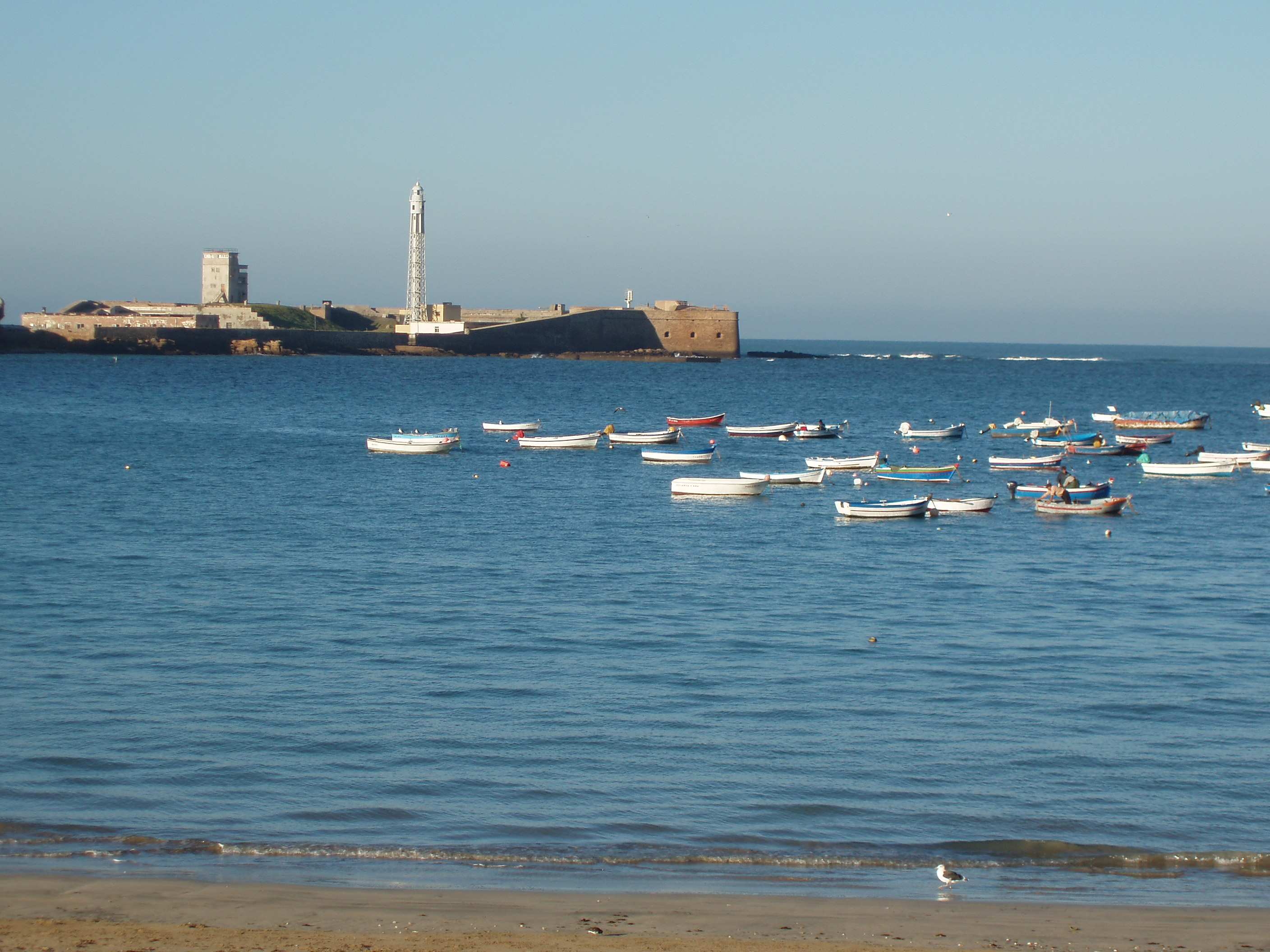
La Caleta beach and Castle of San Sebastián in the background

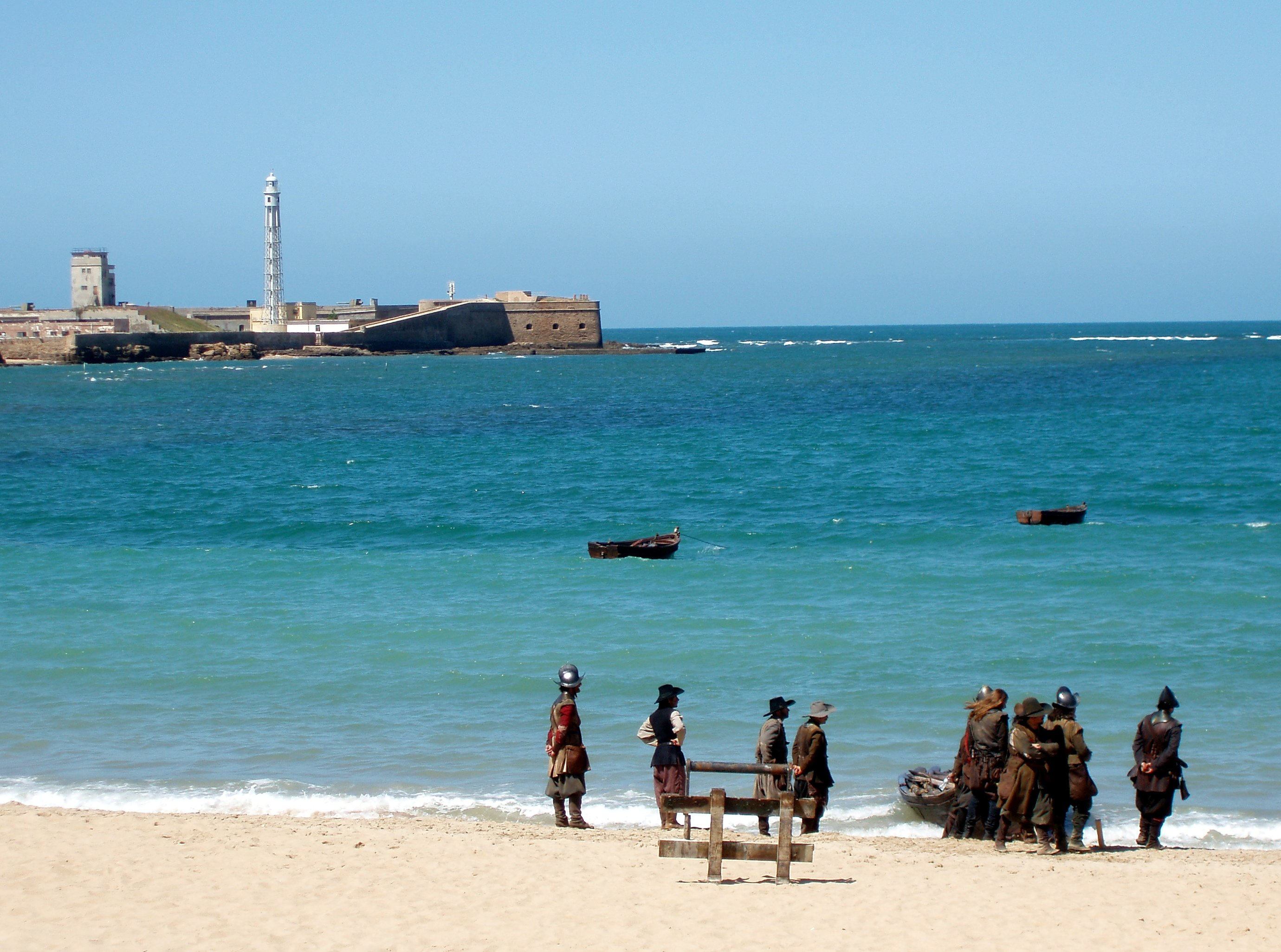
Alatriste filming in La Caleta beach, Cadiz, Spain

La Caleta is a beach located in the historical center of the city of Cádiz, Spain. It is a natural harbor by which Phoenicians, Carthaginians and Romans penetrated historically. It is the smallest beach in the city, and is isolated from the others.

== In culture ==
Its main attraction is its location, a scene that has inspired musicians and poets like Isaac Albéniz, José María Pemán, Paco Alba, and Carlos Cano. It runs in between the castles of San Sebastián and Santa Catalina and in front of the faculty of Economic and Enterprise Sciences of the Campus of Cadiz of the university of the same name.

It has been pictured in several films, such as 007: Die Another Day, Alatriste and Manolete.

Natives of Cádiz consider it one of the most emblematic places of their city, and use it as a recurrent song subject during Carnival.

== Biodiversity ==
Although it is an urban beach, it was a wide range of plants and animals.
