= Dark Blue Almost Black =

- Theatrical release poster
- Spanish: Azuloscurocasinegro
- Directed by: Daniel Sánchez Arévalo
- Screenplay by: Daniel Sánchez Arévalo
- Produced by: José Antonio Félez
- Starring: Quim Gutiérrez; Marta Etura; Antonio de la Torre; Héctor Colomé; Raúl Arévalo; Eva Pallarés
- Cinematography: Juan Carlos Gómez
- Edited by: Nacho Ruiz Capillas
- Music by: Pascal Gaigne
- Production company: Tesela PC
- Distributed by: Alta Classics
- Release dates: 24 March 2006 (Málaga); 31 March 2006 (Spain)
- Running time: 106 minutes
- Country: Spain
- Language: Spanish

Dark Blue Almost Black (Spanish: Azuloscurocasinegro) is a 2006 Spanish drama film written and directed by Daniel Sánchez Arévalo (in his debut feature). It stars Quim Gutiérrez alongside Marta Etura, Antonio de la Torre, Héctor Colomé, Raúl Arévalo, and Eva Pallarés.

The film premiered at the 9th Málaga Film Festival ahead of its 31 March 2006 theatrical release in Spain by Alta Classics.

== Plot ==
Jorge is a young man whose plans for the future are put on hold when his father has a stroke. For seven years, he diligently nurses his father and works as a janitor while studying part-time to get a business degree.

When Natalia, his childhood crush, returns from a stint studying abroad, Jorge begins to yearn for something better. He is desperate to find a new and better job, but finds that no one will hire him because he has experience only as a janitor.

Antonio, Jorge's older brother, soon to be released from jail, is an opportunist who has never gotten along with their father. In prison, at a theater workshop, Antonio meets Paula, a beautiful young woman in jail on drug charges. Paula has a problem because she flirted with another inmate's boyfriend. Violently harassed in jail, she wants to get pregnant in order to be moved out of harm's way into the jail's maternity ward. Antonio initially just wants to have sex with her, but soon he falls in love with Paula. He wants to help her to get pregnant, but he discovers that he is sterile.

Everything changes when Antonio gets out of prison. He plays on Jorge's good nature to get him to step in during conjugal visits and help impregnate his jailbird girlfriend, Paula. Jorge reluctantly agrees, even though it might get in the way of his long-term on-off relationship with Natalia. Meanwhile, Jorge's best friend Israel secretly photographs men visiting an erotic masseur. He finds out that his father is one of the clients and thinks that he is gay. Irritated with his father's hypocrisy, Israel initially starts anonymously blackmailing him. However, he later begins to question his own sexuality when he dares to visit the erotic masseur, following in his father's footsteps.

Jorge's relationship with Natalia becomes difficult after she tries to get him a job where she works but he is only offered a position as a janitor. Then Antonio finds out that their father has an undisclosed bank account full of money.

Jorge makes regular "face-to-face" visits to the women's prison to carry out his brother's wishes and, inevitably, begins to fall for Paula. Gradually, they develop an unusual relationship. She gets pregnant and through her, Jorge learns to stop feeling responsible for everything and finally confront his own wishes, ignoring what the world expects of him. He breaks his relationship with Natalia and decides to wait for Paula's release. The relationship of the two brothers survives Jorge's emotional involvement. Antonio fails to retrieve the money his father had in a secret bank account.

Israel confronts both of his parents and his own sexual identity, finally achieving some degree of peace. Jorge and Paula have a baby daughter. He moves from the building where he has worked and lived for so many years, finding a new job as a janitor. When Jorge thinks of escaping his dead-end life, he dreams of a suit, which is dark blue, almost black. At the end, he takes Israel's car, breaks the store window and grabs the dark blue suit.

== Cast ==
- Quim Gutiérrez as Jorge
- Marta Etura as Paula
- Antonio de la Torre as Antonio
- Héctor Colomé as Andrés
- Raúl Arévalo as Israel
- Eva Pallarés as Natalia
- Manuel Morón as Fernando
- Ana Wagener as Ana
- Roberto Enríquez as Roberto

== Production ==
Sánchez Arévalo developed the story from his short film Física II. The film was produced by Tesela PC and it had the participation of TVE and Canal+.

== Release ==
The film was presented at the 9th Málaga Film Festival on 24 March 2006. Distributed by Alta Classics, it was released in Spanish theatres on 31 March 2006. The film's international festival run included selections for screenings at the 63rd Venice International Film Festival (Venice Days), 2006 Toronto International Film Festival ('Discovery' section), and the 2006 AFI Fest ('Latin Cinema Series'). Sogepaq International handled international sales. The film was released theatrically in the United States in October 2007 by Strand Releasing.

== Reception ==
On the review aggregator website Rotten Tomatoes, 70% of 20 critics' reviews are positive, with an average rating of 6.6/10.

Casimiro Torreiro of El País appreciated how the directorial debut feature was "promising" and displayed "excellent narrative flow, [and] commitment".

Jeannette Catsoulis of The New York Times assessed that Sánchez Arévalo portrayed "repressed longing with been-there, done-that assurance".

Jonathan Holland of Variety declared the film "an assured and captivating drama that combines grit and grace into a distinctive, character-based whole".

== Awards ==
Year	Award	Category	Nominee(s)	Result	Ref.
2006	63rd Venice International Film Festival	Label Europa Cinemas Award		Won	
2006	63rd Venice International Film Festival	UAAR Award		Won	
2007	21st Goya Awards	Best New Director	Daniel Sánchez Arévalo	Won	
2007	21st Goya Awards	Best Original Screenplay	Daniel Sánchez Arévalo	Nominated	
2007	21st Goya Awards	Best Actress	Marta Etura	Nominated	
2007	21st Goya Awards	Best Supporting Actor	Antonio de la Torre	Won	
2007	21st Goya Awards	Best New Actor	Quim Gutiérrez	Won	
2007	21st Goya Awards	Best Original Song	Alba Gárate for "Imaginarte"	Nominated	
2007	16th Actors and Actresses Union Awards	Best Film Actress in a Leading Role	Marta Etura	Nominated	
2007	16th Actors and Actresses Union Awards	Best Film Actor in a Secondary Role	Antonio de la Torre	Won	
2007	16th Actors and Actresses Union Awards	Best Film Actor in a Secondary Role	Hector Colomé	Nominated	
2007	16th Actors and Actresses Union Awards	Best Film Actress in a Minor Role	Ana Wagener	Nominated	
2007	16th Actors and Actresses Union Awards	Best New Actor	Raúl Arévalo	Won	
2007	16th Actors and Actresses Union Awards	Best New Actor	Quim Gutiérrez	Nominated	

== See also ==
- List of Spanish films of 2006
