= The Near East (film) =

- Theatrical release poster
- Spanish: El próximo Oriente
- Directed by: Fernando Colomo
- Screenplay by: Fernando Colomo
- Story by: Joaquín Oristrell; Fernando Colomo
- Produced by: Beatriz de la Gándara; Gustavo Ferrada
- Starring: Javier Cifrián; Nur Al Levi; Asier Etxeandia; Ash Varrez; Lalita Ahmed; Laura Cepeda
- Cinematography: Néstor Calvo
- Edited by: Antonio Lara; María Lara
- Music by: Juan Bardem
- Production companies: Sogecine; Colomo Producciones
- Distributed by: Hispano Foxfilm
- Release date: 18 August 2006
- Running time: 96 minutes
- Country: Spain
- Languages: Spanish; Bengali

The Near East (Spanish: El próximo Oriente) is a 2006 Spanish romantic comedy film written and directed by Fernando Colomo. It stars and Javier Cifrián, Nur Al Levi, and Asier Etxeandia.

== Plot ==
The plot is set in Lavapiés. After Abel impregnates Aisha, a Muslim neighbor with immigrant parents from Bangladesh, Abel's brother Cain steps in pretending to be the father to provide for the creature, marrying Aisha and becoming Muslim himself.

== Cast ==
- Javier Cifrián as Caín
- Asier Etxeandia as Abel
- Nur Al Levi as Aisha
- Ash Varrez as Shaki
- Lalita Ahmed as Samaah
- Laura Cepeda as Milagros
- Kira Miró as Pino
- Víctor Benjumea as Cristóbal
- Gayathri Kesavan
- Laksmi Khabrani

== Production ==
The screenplay was written by Fernando Colomo based on a story by himself and Joaquín Oristrell. The film is a Fernando Colomo Producciones Cinematográficas and Sogecine production. It was shot in Lavapiés.

== Release ==
Hispano Foxfilm took over theatrical distribution of The Near East and other titles of the Sogepaq portfolio. The film was released theatrically in Spain on 18 August 2006.

== Reception ==
Mirito Torreiro of Fotogramas rated the film 3 out of stars, highlighting the "its carefree demeanor; [and] the sharpness of Colomo's gaze" as the best things about the film.

Jonathan Holland of Variety considered that "the busy script leaps with agility from one such screwball situation to the next, not all of them plausible, but fluid editing keeps up the momentum".

== Accolades ==
Year	Award	Category	Nominee(s)	Result	Ref.
2007	21st Goya Awards	Best New Actor	Javier Cifrián	Nominated	
2007	21st Goya Awards	Best Original Song	"Shockal Fire Ashe" by Juan Bardem and Qazi Abdur Rahim	Nominated	
2007	16th Actors and Actresses Union Awards	Best New Actor	Javier Cifrián	Nominated	

== See also ==
- List of Spanish films of 2006
