= Honeymoon with My Mother =

2022 Spanish comedy film

- Theatrical release poster
- Spanish: Amor de madre
- Directed by: Paco Caballero
- Written by: Cirstóbal Garrido; Antonio Valor
- Produced by: Sofía Fábregas; Juan Gordon
- Starring: Carmen Machi; Quim Gutiérrez
- Edited by: Nacho Ruiz Capillas
- Music by: Lucas Vidal
- Production company: Netflix Animation Studios
- Distributed by: Netflix
- Release date: 22 April 2022
- Running time: 110 minutes
- Country: Spain
- Language: Spanish

Honeymoon with My Mother (Spanish: Amor de madre) is a 2022 Spanish comedy film directed by Paco Caballero. It stars Carmen Machi and Quim Gutiérrez in the main roles.

== Synopsis ==
When José Luis is dumped on the altar by his girlfriend, his mother Mari Carmen tries to cheer him up. Among the wedding's wasted plans is a prepaid honeymoon to Mauritius. Mari Carmen insists that her son does not lose the money of that trip, and they both embark on a mother-son vacation to the African island nation. Surrounded by beaches and commodities, José Luis feels at his worst while Mari Carmen enjoys every day of the holiday, showing a side previously unknown to her family.

== Cast ==
- Carmen Machi as Mari Carmen
- Quim Gutiérrez as José Luis
- Yolanda Ramos as Montse
- Justina Bustos as Sara
- Dominique Guillo as Armando
- Celia Freijeiro as Teresa
- Edeen Bhugeloo as Jean Pierre
- Jake Francois as Calvin
- Andrés Velencoso as DJ Chucho
- Jorge Suquet as a travel agent
- Juanjo Cucalón as Ángel

== Filming ==
Filming took place mainly in March 2020 on Mauritius, an island nation east of Madagascar, just before the start of the COVID-19 pandemic in Africa. The work resumed in August 2020, with actresses Ramos and Bustos contracting COVID-19, for which they remained isolated for nearly a month at a local hospital.

Justina Bustos kept a photographic and video record of the isolation by using her cell phone and taking notes and drawing on a diary. When Bustos returned to her native Argentina and after the end of the pandemic, Bustos was contacted by Hernán Casciari who showed interesting in making a documentary about her experience in isolation in Mauritius. The production was released in June 2023.

Filming was completed in January 2021 with some scenes being taken in Madrid and Tenerife.

== Reception ==
Film review aggregator Rotten Tomatoes has for the film an approval rating of 52% based on four reviews as of April 2026 and an average rating of 3/5 stars, with criticism focused on the film's predictability and flatness while praising Gutiérrez and Ramos as the best actors of the production.

Andrea Nogueira Calvar of El País gave the film a positive review. Other positive opinions were made by Sergio Pinilla and Beatríz Martínez of 20 minutos and El Periódico, respectively. Sofía Otero of Las Furias Magazine criticized the film for its lack of innovation and said that the feminist aim that it had by showing a middle-aged woman enjoying life did not do any good, instead failing and bringing the typical women's tropes again to Spanish cinema.
