= Out of the Depths =

Out of the Depths may refer to:

- Out of the Depths (1919 film), a German silent drama film
- Out of the Depths (1921 film), an American silent Western film
- Out of the Depths (1945 film), an American war drama film
- Psalm 130, the Psalm that begins with these words

== See also ==
- De Profundis (disambiguation)
