= Laura Pedro =

Spanish visual effects artist (born 1990)

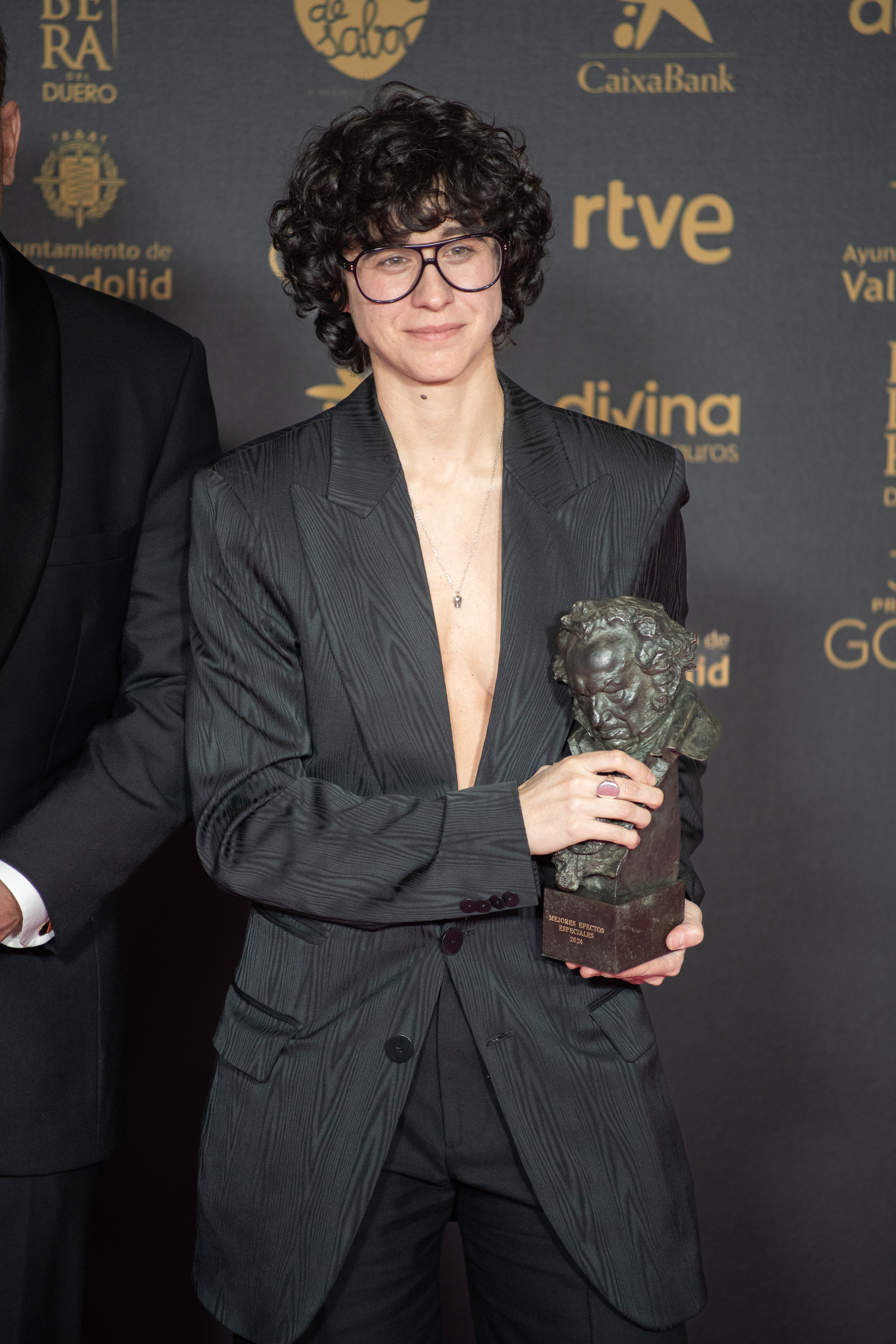
- Pedro in 2024
- Born: Laura Pedro Albiol; 1989 (age 35–36); Barcelona, Catalonia, Spain
- Occupation: Visual effects supervisor

Laura Pedro Albiol (born 1989) is a Spanish visual effects supervisor. She is the first woman to win the Goya Award for Best Special Effects.

== Biography ==
Pedro initially wanted to be a camera operator, but a motorcycle accident prevented her from doing so. She studied visual effects at the ESCAC film school until 2013. After completing her studies, she joined the film company “El Ranchito” as a digital composer, where she has worked as a VFX supervisor since 2016.

Pedro is openly lesbian. In 2023, she was included in the list of the 15 most important and influential lesbians in the world by Elle magazine, in 8th place.

== Awards and nominations ==
Pedro was awarded the Goya (alongside Lluis Rivera) and the Gaudí Award for her special effects work in Superlópez, a 2018 film directed by Javier Ruiz Caldera, and also received a Goya for Way Down (2021). She received another Gaudí for Un año, una noche (2022). She received the European Film Award for La sociedad de la nieve (2023), and her third Goya award in 2024 for the same film.

== Filmography ==
=== Films ===
- 2016: Un monstruo viene a verme
- 2017: Piel fría
- 2018: Superlópez
- 2019: Quien a hierro mata
- 2020: Malnazidos
- 2021: Way Down
- 2022: Un año, una noche
- 2023: La sociedad de la nieve

=== Series ===
- ¡García!
