= Alatriste =

- Theatrical release poster
- Directed by: Agustín Díaz Yanes
- Written by: Agustín Díaz Yanes; Arturo Pérez-Reverte
- Produced by: Álvaro Augustín; Antonio Cardenal
- Starring: Viggo Mortensen; Elena Anaya
- Cinematography: Paco Femenia
- Edited by: José Salcedo
- Music by: Roque Baños
- Distributed by: 20th Century Fox
- Release date: 1 September 2006
- Running time: 145 minutes
- Country: Spain
- Languages: Spanish; Dutch
- Box office: $23 million

Alatriste is a 2006 Spanish epic historical war film directed by Agustín Díaz Yanes, based on the main character of a series of novels written by Arturo Pérez-Reverte, The Adventures of Captain Alatriste (Las aventuras del Capitán Alatriste).

The film, which stars Viggo Mortensen, is the most expensive Spanish language film ever made in Spain (about €24 million – US$30 million). It portrays Spain of the 17th century using both fictional and real characters. Twentieth Century Fox has bought the rights to the film.

The film was released on 1 September 2006.

== Plot ==
The story takes place during the 17th century in the Spanish Empire. Diego Alatriste is a soldier in the service of King Philip IV of Spain during the Eighty Years' War. The story begins in the Spanish Netherlands, where his tercio fights in the Dutch Revolt. His friend Lope Balboa is killed during the fighting, and Alatriste returns to Madrid where he takes Lope's young son Íñigo into his care.

Living in Madrid, Alatriste makes his living as a hired swordsman, accepting assignments from nobles and powerful political figures. On one such missions, Alatriste is hired along with a Sicilian assassin named Gualterio Malatesta to kill the Prince of Wales (the future King Charles I of England) and his companion, the Duke of Buckingham. The job is contracted by Emilio Bocanegra and Luis de Alquézar (uncle of Íñigo's love interest, Angélica de Alquézar). However, upon discovering the identity of the targets, Alatriste refuses to carry out the killing. His decision places him in conflict with powerful figures within the Spanish aristocracy and the Inquisition, particularly the ruthless royal secretary Luis de Alquézar and the ambitious inquisitor Emilio Bocanegra. Emilio excommunicated Alatriste for his failure and sent assassins after him, but Malatesta arrived and saved him just in time. When Olivares, the King's most trusted advisor, learned about the conspiracy, he summon Alatriste to answer for his action, impressed by his daring and discreetness, Olivares pardoned Alatriste for his action, and sent Luis de Alquézar to West Indies. To prevent further trouble with Inquisition's assassins, Olivares sent Alatriste to Flanders to fight against the Dutch. Alatriste finally returns to the Netherlands in 1624 (although the movie states 1625) and participates in the final battles leading to Breda's surrender.

After returning to Spain, Íñigo wants to elope with Angélica, but she gets cold feet at the last moment. Alatriste has a romance with actress María de Castro. Because she was disappointed that she failed to marry him, she became the lover of Philip IV. Alatriste ends up crossing swords with Guadalmedina, a friend of the king. In the end, the object of their attention falls ill with syphilis. The duel with his friend Martín Saldaña and the punishment of Íñigo in the galleys are part of the film's spectacular ending.

The last scenes are at the Battle of Rocroi (May 1643), described in the last book of The Adventures of Captain Alatriste saga. During the battle, Abel Moreno Gómez's "La Madrugá" is playing as the defeated army's march and this is where it is assumed that Alatriste dies.

The plot of the film has elements from each of the five books published up to the premiere, and it maintains the same storyline for the main characters. It includes excerpts from the future books of the saga.

== Cast ==
- Viggo Mortensen as Captain Diego Alatriste
- Javier Cámara as Gaspar de Guzmán, Count-Duke of Olivares
- Eduardo Noriega as the Count of Guadalmedina
- Juan Echanove as the poet Francisco de Quevedo
- Unax Ugalde as Íñigo de Balboa, Alatriste's Basque squire
- Elena Anaya as Angélica de Alquézar, a teenaged femme fatale
- Ariadna Gil as María de Castro, Alatriste's actress lover
- Eduard Fernández as Sebastián Copons, Alatriste's closest friend
- Francesc Garrido as Martín Saldaña, the local sheriff
- Blanca Portillo as the inquisitor fray Emilio Bocanegra
- Antonio Dechent as Curro Garrote, a soldier friend of Alastriste
- Paco Tous as Francisco de Melo
- Enrico Lo Verso as Gualterio Malatesta, an Italian swordsman and Alatriste's nemesis
- Luis Zahera as Luis Pereira, a Portuguese soldier
- Pilar Bardem as nun
- Simon Cohen as Philip IV
- Pilar López de Ayala as Malatesta's wife

Antonio Resines, originally slated to appear as Saldaña, almost retired from the entire movie due to a traffic accident; however, he makes a cameo appearance in the Battle of Rocroi as a musketeer officer.

== Reception ==
=== Critical response ===
Alatriste has an approval rating of 17% on review aggregator website Rotten Tomatoes, based on 6 reviews, and an average rating of 4.1/10.

=== Awards and nominations ===
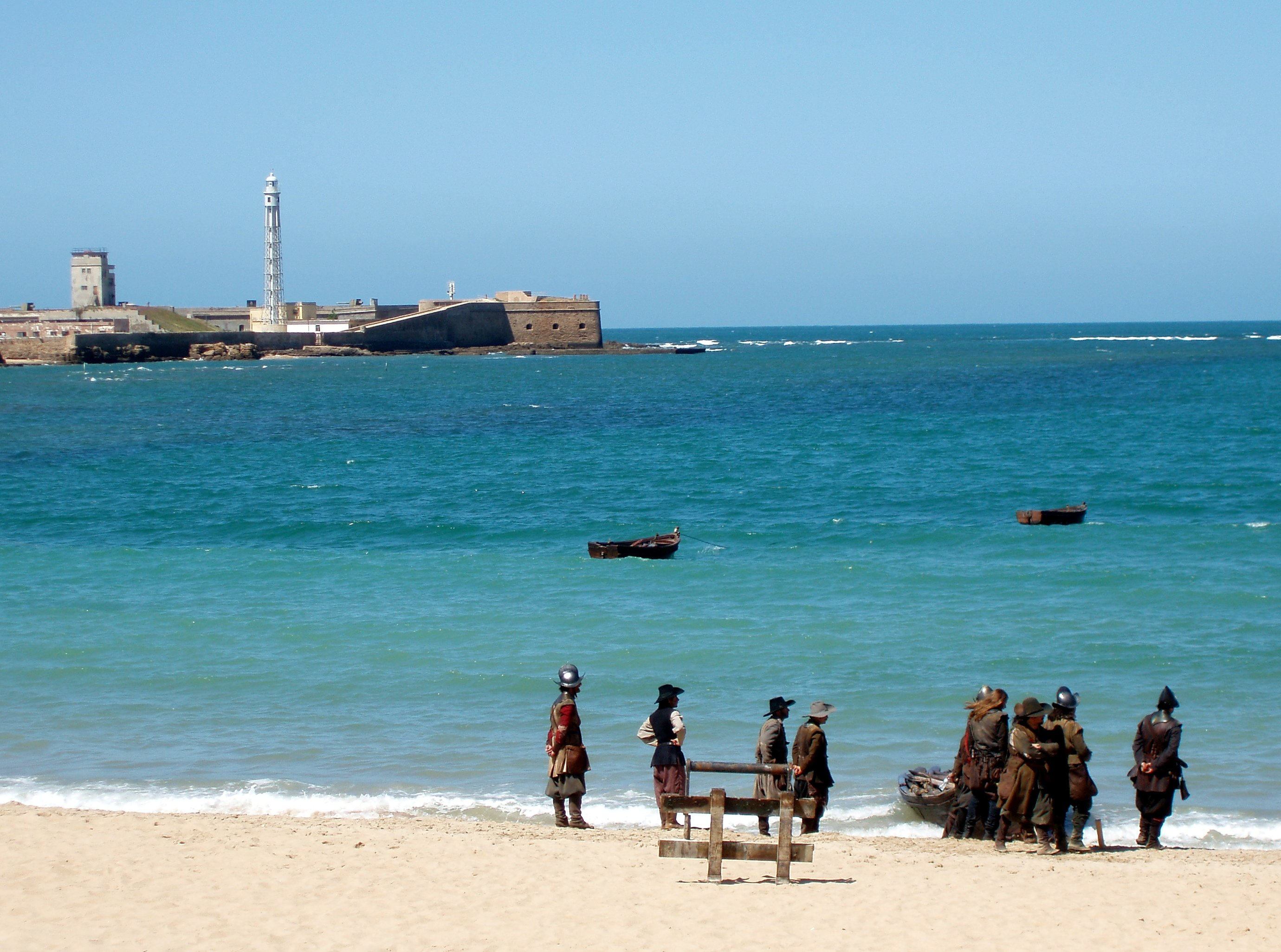
Alatriste filming in La Caleta beach, Cádiz, Spain

Year	Award	Category	Nominee(s)	Result	Ref.
2007	12th Forqué Award	Best Film		Nominated	
2007	21st Goya Awards	Best Film		Nominated	
2007	21st Goya Awards	Best Actor	Viggo Mortensen	Nominated	
2007	21st Goya Awards	Best Director	Agustín Díaz Yanes	Nominated	
2007	21st Goya Awards	Best Adapted Screenplay	Agustín Díaz Yanes	Nominated	
2007	21st Goya Awards	Best Supporting Actor	Juan Echanove	Nominated	
2007	21st Goya Awards	Best Supporting Actress	Ariadna Gil	Nominated	
2007	21st Goya Awards	Best Production Supervision	Cristina Zumárraga	Won	
2007	21st Goya Awards	Best Original Score	Roque Baños	Nominated	
2007	21st Goya Awards	Best Art Direction	Benjamín Fernández	Won	
2007	21st Goya Awards	Best Costume Design	Francesca Sartori	Won	
2007	21st Goya Awards	Best Cinematography	Paco Femenía	Nominated	
2007	21st Goya Awards	Best Editing	José Salcedo	Nominated	
2007	21st Goya Awards	Best Makeup and Hairstyles	José Luis Pérez	Nominated	
2007	21st Goya Awards	Best Sound	Dominique Hennequin, Patrice Grisolet, Pierre Gamet	Nominated	
2007	21st Goya Awards	Best Special Effects	Reyes Abades, Rafael Solorzano	Nominated	
2007	16th Actors and Actresses Union Awards	Best Film Actor in a Minor Role	Javier Cámara	Nominated	
