= Quim Gutiérrez =

Spanish actor (born 1981)

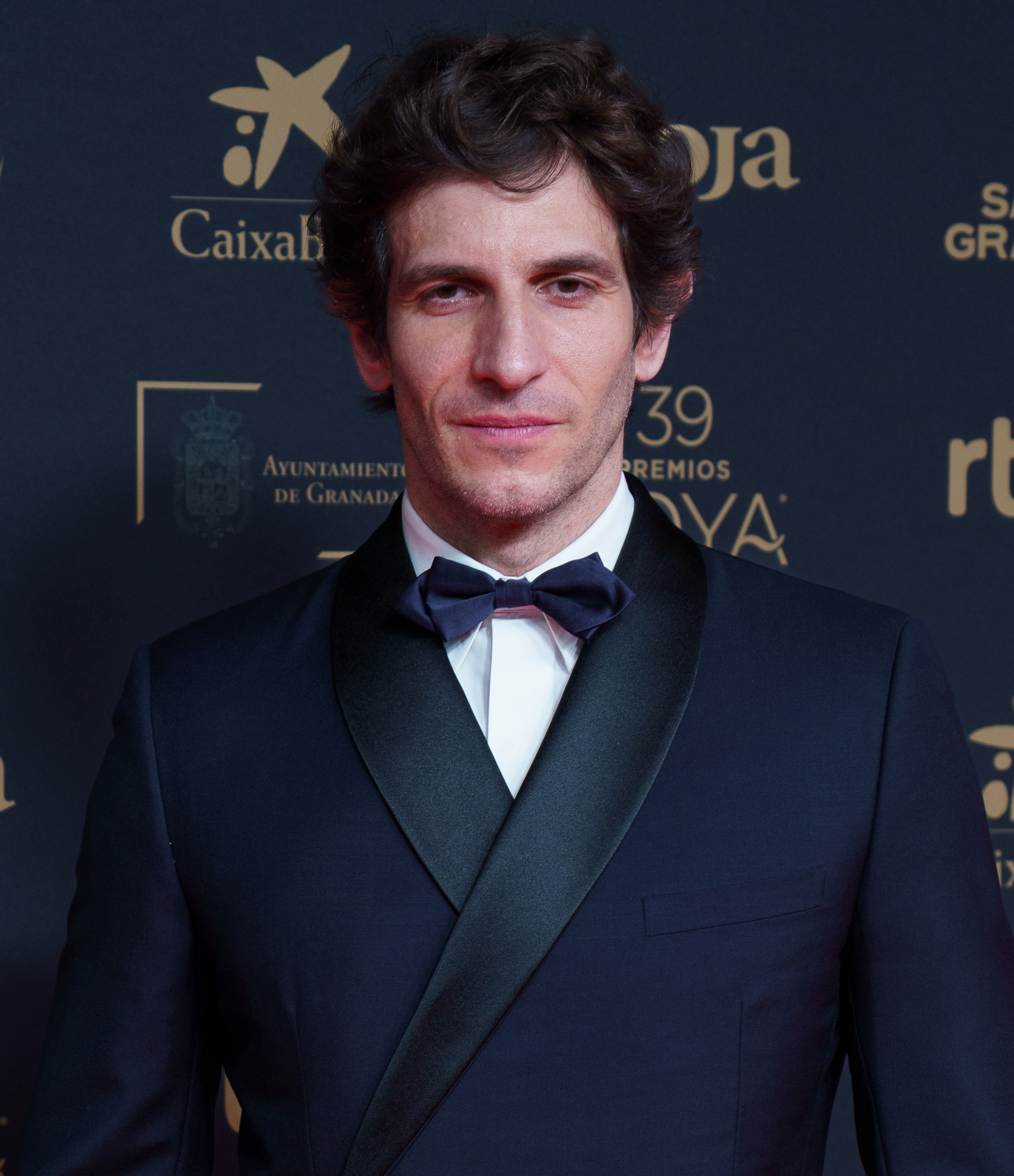
- Gutiérrez in 2025
- Born: Joaquim Gutiérrez Ylla; 27 March 1981 (age 45); Barcelona, Catalonia, Spain
- Occupation: Actor

Joaquim "Quim" Gutiérrez Ylla (Spanish: [ˈkiŋ ɡuˈtjereθ]; born 27 March 1981) is a Spanish actor. He won the Goya Award for Best New Actor for his performance in Dark Blue Almost Black (2006).

== Life and career ==
Joaquim Gutiérrez Ylla was born in Barcelona on 27 March 1981. Already at age 12, he landed his television debut in Catalan soap opera Poblenou. He studied Humanities at the Pompeu Fabra University and trained his acting chops at the Nancy Tuñón theatre school in Barcelona. He returned to the small screen with a 5-year-long spell in El cor de la ciutat.

Gutiérrez was chosen by Givenchy Creative Director Riccardo Tisci to star in the brands Autumn/Winter 2013 Advertising Campaign.

== Selected filmography ==
=== Film ===
Year	Title	Role	Notes	Ref.
2006	Sin ti	Casimiro		
2006	Azuloscurocasinegro (Dark Blue Almost Black)	Jorge		
2008	Sangre de Mayo (Blood in May)	Gabriel Araceli		
2010	Una hora más en Canarias (With or Without Love)	Pablo		
2011	Primos (Cousinhood)	Diego		
2011	La cara oculta (The Hidden Face)	Adrián		
2012	Todo es silencio (All Is Silence)	Fins		
2013	Los últimos días (The Last Days)	Marc		
2013	3 bodas de más (Three Many Weddings)	Jonás		
2013	¿Quién mató a Bambi? (Who Killed Bambi?)	David		
2013	La gran familia española (Family United)	Caleb		
2014	Les Yeux jaunes des crocodiles	Luca Giampaoli		
2014	Sexo fácil, películas tristes (Easy Sex, Sad Movies)	Víctor		
2015	Anacleto: agente secreto (Spy Time)	Adolfo		
2017	La niebla y la doncella (The Mist and the Maiden)	Sargento Rubén Bevilacqua		
2017	Abracadabra	Tito		
2019	Litus	Toni		
2019	Ventajas de viajar en tren (Advantages of Travelling by Train)	Emilio		
2019	Klaus	Jesper	Spanish dub	
2020	Te quiero, imbécil (I Love You, Stupid)	Marcos		
2020	Chasing Wonders	Goyo		
2021	Jungle Cruise	Melchor		
2021	Madeleine Collins	Abdel Soriano		
2022	Honeymoon with My Mother (Amor de madre)	José Luis		
2023	Red Island (L'île rouge)	Robert Lopez		
2024	Al otro barrio (From Good to the Hood)	Andrés		
2025	Los aitas (Breaking Walls)			
2025	Un funeral de locos	Daniel		
2026	Amarga Navidad (Bitter Christmas)	Santi		
2026	Haciendo amigos	Félix		

=== Television ===
Year	Title	Role	Notes	Ref.
2006–07	Génesis: en la mente del asesino	Daniel		
2016	El padre de Caín	Eloy		
2017	El accidente	José Espada		
2019–21	El Vecino	Javier		
2023	El cuerpo en llamas (Burning Body)	Albert		

== Accolades ==
Year	Award	Category	Work	Result	Ref.
2007	21st Goya Awards	Best New Actor	Dark Blue Almost Black	Won	
2007	16th Actors and Actresses Union Awards	Best New Actor	Dark Blue Almost Black	Nominated	
2016	3rd Feroz Awards	Best Supporting Actor	Spy Time	Nominated	
2016	8th Gaudí Awards	Best Supporting Actor	Spy Time	Nominated	
2020	7th Feroz Awards	Best Supporting Actor	Advantages of Travelling by Train	Nominated	
2024	11th Feroz Awards	Best Main Actor in a Series	Burning Body	Nominated	
2024	32nd Actors and Actresses Union Awards	Best Television Actor in a Leading Role	Burning Body	Won	
