= Valley of the Dead (film) =

- Theatrical release poster
- Spanish: Malnazidos
- Directed by: Javier Ruiz Caldera; Alberto de Toro
- Written by: Jaime Marques Olarreaga; Alberto Fernández Arregui; Cristian Conti
- Produced by: Ghislain Barrois; Álvaro Augustin; Cristian Conti; Javier Ugarte; Edmon Roch
- Starring: Miki Esparbé; Aura Garrido; Luis Callejo; Álvaro Cervantes; Jesús Carroza; María Botto
- Cinematography: Kiko de la Rica
- Music by: Javier Rodero
- Production companies: Telecinco Cinema; Cactus Flower Producciones; Malnazidos AIE; La Terraza Films; Ikiru Films
- Distributed by: Sony Pictures Releasing
- Release dates: 8 October 2020 (Sitges); 11 March 2022 (Spain)
- Running time: 102 minutes
- Country: Spain
- Language: Spanish

Valley of the Dead (Spanish: Malnazidos) is a 2020 Spanish zombie action film directed by Javier Ruiz Caldera and Alberto de Toro. Set in the latter period of the Spanish Civil War, the film features an ensemble cast of Miki Esparbé, Aura Garrido, Luis Callejo, Álvaro Cervantes, Jesús Carroza and María Botto.

The film premiered at a 53rd Sitges Film Festival, and was set to be theatrically released in January 2021, to be distributed by Sony Pictures, but its release was delayed twice as a result of COVID-19 pandemic in Spain. The film was eventually opened to Spanish theatres on 11 March 2022.

== Plot ==
During the Spanish Civil War, Nationalist soldier Jan Lozano is ordered by his uncle, General Lozano, to deliver a secret message to Alarcos–across Republican frontlines, in exchange for staving off his execution for assaulting a military judge. Inexperienced with driving, Jan chooses Private Decruz, a young deserter also facing execution, as his driver. They spot a Nationalist pilot ejecting from a dogfight, but as they went to investigate, they are captured by a group of Republicans led by a man simply called as "Sergeant".

The Nationalist pilot–who had already died–suddenly reanimates and bites their American war photographer; Sergeant and Jaime, the Republican's political commissar, dispatches them both. As they arrive at a recently bombed-out campsite, they are attacked by their reanimated comrades, forcing them to flee, but Brodsky, a Russian member of the group, was overwhelmed.. Reaching their cabin, they find it occupied by Nationalist soldiers Jurell and Rafir, and a religious nun, Flor, resulting in a standoff until Jan convinces both sides to form a truce. A large horde of infected approaches the cabin and the group escapes by the back door. They come across an electric fence and find Brodsky stuck to it, which Jan mercy kills to spare the Sergeant from doing it himself.

Jan reveals that the secret message he was carrying contains a map written in invisible ink containing maps of experiments and horde movements, leading him to suspect that the Waffen-SS, who had sealed off the entire valley, have foreknowledge of this plague, and requests for the group to investigate. They come across a nearby village where they find Ana–a lone survivor of a massacre earlier perpetrated by Waffen-SS soldiers. She revealed that her husband protected her from gunfire and states the SS conducted experiments on zombies before they were slaughtered as well. Jaime steals files containing the chemical formula, intending to aid the Republicans in winning the war. His Republican companions disagree and Jaime briefly takes Decruz hostage, only for him to be swarmed and killed by the infected. The group escapes through the church tunnels, but Ana dies from her injuries and reanimates. Rafir's boot saves him from transformation, but Flor, having her leg bitten, stays behind.

Jan convinces the group to go to his base to find an antidote for the plague, vowing that he wants to stop the outbreak and save his brother, who is a Republican soldier. Upon arriving, Lozano reveals that he is also aware of the outbreak and pleads Jan to leave the valley before the Germans launch a bombing raid, but Jan refuses, and Lozano is shot dead by the SS Commander, who had instigated the massacre on Ana's village and created the zombie formula. Decruz–having also been bitten–blows up a fence and himself to allow the group to enter the base. The explosion also attracts a horde of infected who swarm the base, slaughtering the fleeing Spanish Nationalists and the Waffen-SS personnel.

Rafir is pulled down by a zombie while providing fire, while Match, a Republican, and Jurrell are trapped inside a truck surrounded by zombies. After bonding with one another, they blow themselves up along with the zombies. Jan and Priest-killer, the only woman in the Republican group, storms the laboratory train car and confront the SS commander, who injects himself with the formula and declares there is no antidote. Priest-killer shoots the SS commander in the head before he could reanimate, but Jan is bitten on the hand by another zombie; she immediately amputates his hand with her machete, preventing his transformation. Sergeant manages to get the train moving but shoots himself as zombies close in on him. German bombers arrive and pummel the valley, obliterating the base and engulfing the train as Jan and Priest-killer kiss inside the laboratory chamber.

The train escapes through the mountains, with Jan, Priest-killer, and Rafir being the only survivors on board. Arriving at the Nationalist frontlines, Priest-killer tells him her intention to escape into France, before they bid goodbyes and went their separate ways.

In the mid-credits scene, a bloodied hand moves amongst the train wreckage as a scream is heard.

== Cast ==
- Miki Esparbé as Jan Lozano
- Aura Garrido as Matacuras ('Priest-killer')
- Luis Callejo as Sargento
- Álvaro Cervantes as Mecha (‘Matches’)
- Jesús Carroza as Jurell
- María Botto as Sor Flor ('Sister Flor')
- Dafnis Balduz as Jaime
- Manel Llunell as Decruz
- Mouad Ghazouan as Rafir
- Sergio Torrico as Brodsky
- Francisco Reyes as SS commander

== Production ==
Malnazidos is an adaptation of the novel Noche de difuntos del 38 by Manuel Martín Ferreras. The film was produced by Telecinco Cinema, Cactus Flower Producciones, Malnazidos AIE, La Terraza Films and Ikiru Films. It was co-directed by Javier Ruiz Caldera and Alberto de Toro whereas the screenplay was written by Jaime Marqués Olarreaga, Alberto Fernández Arregui and Cristian Conti. Ghislain Barrois, Álvaro Augustin, Cristian Conti, Javier Ugarte and Edmon Rochare were credited as producers. Shooting took place in Catalonia.

== Release ==
The film premiered on 8 October 2020, at the 53rd Sitges Film Festival (FICFC).

Initially intended to be theatrically released in Spain on 22 January 2021, the release was postponed to 24 September 2021 due to the COVID-19 pandemic, which caused the shelving of all Telecinco Cinema titles pending for theatrical release. Postponed again, its release was eventually rescheduled for 11 March 2022.

== Accolades ==
| Year | Award | Category | Nominee(s) | Result | Ref. |
|---|---|---|---|---|---|
| 2023 | 15th Gaudí Awards | Best Visual Effects | Lluís Rivera, Laura Pedro | Nominated | |
| 2023 | 15th Gaudí Awards | Best Makeup and Hairstyles | Montse Sanfeliu, Jesús Martos | Nominated | |
| 2023 | 37th Goya Awards | Best Costume Design | Cristina Rodríguez | Nominated | |
| 2023 | 37th Goya Awards | Best Special Effects | Lluís Rivera, Laura Pedro | Nominated | |

== See also ==
- List of Spanish films of 2022
