= Right You Are (if you think so) =

Drama by Luigi Pirandello

- Written by: Luigi Pirandello
- Original language: Italian
- Genre: Drama

Premiere
- Date premiered: 18 June 1917
- Place premiered: Milan, Italy

Right You Are (if you think so) (Italian: Così è (se vi pare) [koˌsi ˈɛ se (v)vi ˈpaːre, koˌzi -]), also translated as So It Is (If You Think So), is an Italian drama by Luigi Pirandello. The play is based on Pirandello's short story La signora Frola e il signor Ponza, suo genero. Così è (se vi pare) premiered on 18 June 1917 in Milan, Italy. An English adaptation of the play was created and directed by Franco Zeffirelli, performed in London in 2003.

== Plot ==
Mr. Ponza and his mother-in-law, Mrs Frola, escape to a quiet provincial town after a terrible earthquake in Marsica. It is rumored Ponza is married, but no one has ever seen Mrs. Ponza. The Ponzas stay on the top floor on a nearby block, while Mrs Frola lives in a stylish apartment. The trio is the subject of many rumours. Townspeople see Ponza as a monster who prevents his wife from leaving the house. So, Mr. Ponza's boss, Councillor Agazzi, goes to the prefect to bring out the truth and clarify the matter. Lamberto Laudisi defends the newly arrived from the curiosity of the village, stating the impossibility of knowing each other and, more generally, absolute truth.

Mrs Frola becomes the object of a real investigation on the life of her family. Mr. Ponza is under the same investigation, during which he declares his mother-in-law insane. He explains Mrs Frola went insane after the death of her daughter Lina (his first wife), and he convinced Mrs Frola that Giulia (his second wife) is actually her daughter and is still alive. To preserve the illusion, they had to take a number of those precautions that made everyone suspicious.

The townspeople are stunned but reassured by the revelation. Mrs Frola soon learns of Ponza's story and claims he is crazy, at least in considering Giulia as his second wife. Mrs Frola says her daughter Lina Ponza had been in an asylum, and she would not have been accepted back at home without the second marriage, as if she were a second woman. Everyone is stunned, not knowing what to think, except Laudisi, who bursts into laughter. The search for evidence to determine the truth is actually the opportunity to Laudisi to unravel the meaning of this, while arguing with his own reflection in the mirror:

Oh dear! Who is insane among us? Oh I know, [pointing at himself] I say YOU! Who goes there, face to face, we know well the two of us. The trouble is that, like I do, others do not see you ... For others you become a ghost! And you see his as insane? Regardless of the ghosts who haunt them, they are running, full of curiosity, behind the ghosts of others!

In an attempt to solve the riddle, Councillor Agazzi arranges a meeting between mother-in-law and son-in-law: the resulting scenes are full of frenzied violence, in which Mr. Ponza screams at his mother-in-law. He later apologizes for his attitude ("I apologize to the attendees for this sad drama that I had to stage to partially repair the harm that you have involuntarily done to this poor woman believing to act mercily towards her"), saying that it was necessary to play the part of the madman to keep alive the illusion of Mrs. Frola.

In the last act, after a vain search for evidence among the survivors of the earthquake, they seek out the first wife of Mr. Ponza. A mysterious young woman, whose face is covered by a black veil, enters the Agazzis parlour. She claims to be to be the daughter of Mrs. Frola and, at the same time, the second wife of Mr. Ponza, and, as for herself, to be none of the aforementioned: for herself, she says, "I am she, who one believes me to be," then leaves. Laudisi then turns to the attendees with a mocking expression towards their vain attempts to learn the secrets of the Ponza family, asking them: "And now, ladies and gentlemen, listen how the truth speaks! Are you satisfied?" before bursting into a derisive laughter upon which the curtain falls.

== Characters ==
- Lamberto Laudisi
- Lady Frola
- Mr. Ponza, her son-in-law
- Lady Ponza
- Councillor Agazzi
- Lady Amalia, his wife and sister of Lamberto Laudisi
- Dina, their daughter
- Lady Sirelli
- Mr. Sirelli
- The Prefect
- Commissioner Centuri
- Lady Cini
- Lady Nenni
- a waiter in the Agazzi's home
- other Ladies and Gentlemen

== Background and history ==
The play is based on Pirandello's short story La signora Frola e il signor Ponza, suo genero. Così è (se vi pare) premiered on 18 June 1917 in Milan, Italy.

== Genre and themes ==
During his speech when presenting the Nobel Prize in Literature to Pirandello in 1934, Per Hallström, Permanent Secretary of the Swedish Academy, said that the play is "a brilliant satire on man's curiosity and false wisdom; in it Pirandello presents a catalogue of types and reveals a penetrating self-conceit, either partially or completely ridiculous, in those attempting to discover truth".

== Translations into English ==
- Right You Are! (If You Think So) by Arthur Livingston (E. P. Dutton & Co., 1922), later revised as It Is So! (If You Think So)
- Right You Are by Eric Bentley (1954)
- Right You Are (If You Think So) by Frederick May (1960)
- Right You Are (If You Think You Are) by Bruce Penman (1987)
- So It Is (If You Think So) by Mark Musa (Penguin Books, 1996)

=== Adaptations ===
In 2003 Franco Zeffirelli commissioned a new translation/adaptation by Martin Sherman entitled Absolutely {Perhaps} and performed at Wyndham's Theatre in London. The performance, in which Joan Plowright played Lady Olivier and Oliver Ford Davies played Lamberto, also played at the Theatre Royal Haymarket in London. In 2023, a Bengali stage adaptation was produced by Arpita Ghosh and staged in Kolkata by theatre group Pancham Vaidic. The adaptation is named Tumi Thik Jodi Tumi Bhabo Tumi Thik (trans. You are Right if You Think You are Right).

== Sources ==
- Baccolo, L. Luigi Pirandello. Milan: Bocca. 1949 (second edition).
- Di Pietro, A. Luigi Pirandello. Milan: Vita e Pensiero. 1950 (second edition).
- Ferrante, R. Luigi Pirandello. Firenze: Parenti. 1958.
- Gardair, J.-M.Pirandello e il suo doppio. Rome: Abete. 1977.
- Janner, A. Luigi Pirandello. Firenze: La Nuova Italia. 1948.
- Monti, M. Pirandello, Palermo: Palumbo. 1974.
- Moravia, A. "Pirandello" in Fiera Letteraria. Rome. December 12, 1946.
- Pancrazi, P. "L'altro Pirandello" in Scrittori Italiani del Novecento. Bari: Laterza. 1939.
- Pasini, F. Pirandello nell'arte e nella vita. Padova. 1937.
- Virdia, F. Pirandello. Milan: Mursia. 1975.
