= David Martí =

David Martí (born 1971 in Barcelona, Spain) is an actor and makeup specialist. He won the Academy Award for Makeup for his work in Pan's Labyrinth (2006: original Spanish title El laberinto del fauno), which he shared with his fellow make-up and special effects supervisor, Montse Ribé. He was one of 115 people invited to join the Academy of Motion Picture Arts and Sciences in 2007.
