= Emilio Ruiz del Río =

Spanish film set director and SFX/VFX artist

- Born: 11 April 1923; Madrid, Spain
- Died: 14 September 2007 (aged 84); Madrid, Spain
- Education: Real Academia de Bellas Artes de San Fernando
- Occupations: Set decorator; visual effects artist; special effects artist

Emilio Ruiz del Río (11 April 1923 – September 14, 2007) was a Spanish film set decorator and special effects and visual effects artist. Ruiz del Rio's career spanned over 60 years.

== Career ==
Ruiz del Río's filmography includes work on over 450 films from studios in Europe and the United States. His career lasted more than sixty years. Among Ruiz del Río's achievements was to consistently work with a number of higher profile directors, including with Stanley Kubrick on Spartacus (1960), George Cukor on Travels with My Aunt (1970), Orson Welles on Mr. Arkadin (1955), and Guillermo del Toro on Pan's Labyrinth (El Laberinto del Fauno) (2006).

Emilio Ruiz del Río continued to work up until his death in 2007. He was currently working on Luz de Domingo (Sunday Light) by Spanish director José Luis Garci when he died. Garci's film was chosen to compete for Spain's nomination for an Academy Award for best foreign film in September 2007.

Emilio Ruiz del Río died of respiratory failure on September 14, 2007 at San Rafael Hospital in Madrid. He was 84 years old.

== Awards ==
Ruiz del Río was the recipient of three Goya Awards. His most recent win was for his work on Pan's Labyrinth (El Laberinto del Fauno). Pan's Labyrinth also won three Oscars in 2006, though none in Ruiz del Río's category.

== Quotes ==
- "Everything I have done and continue to do is aimed exclusively at learning" - Emilio Ruiz del Río in his 1996 memoir.
- "When a director asks me for one thing I give him two, not out of generosity but because in this way I impose on myself a challenge that I have to resolve, and this stimulates me." - Emilio Ruiz del Río
