= De profundis (film) =

- Poster
- Directed by: Miguelanxo Prado
- Release date: 2006

De profundis is a Galician film directed by Miguelanxo Prado in 2006.

It is a 71-minute long animated film that tells a story rooted in the myths of Atlantic cultures. The protagonists of the film are a painter who dreams of being a sailor and fisherman and a woman who plays the cello, in love and sharing a house in the middle of the sea.

The production is carried out by Continental Producciones, S.A., Desembarco Producións, S.L., Estrella Galicia and Zeppelin Filmes, while the distributor was Biblos Clube de Lectores. The film was released on January 17, 2007, and was nominated for the 2006 Goya Awards in the category of Best Animated Feature.
