= Reyes Abades =

Spanish animator (1949–2018)

- Abades with an award in 2011
- Born: Reyes Abades Tejedor; 25 July 1949; Castilblanco, Spain
- Died: 1 February 2018 (aged 68)
- Occupations: Specialist in special effects and animator
- Spouse: María Ruano
- Children: Óscar and César Abades

Reyes Abades Tejedor (25 July 1949 – 1 February 2018) was a Spanish specialist in special effects. He won nine Goya Awards. Abades worked on more than 300 productions. He contributed to the opening and closing ceremonies for the 1992 Summer Olympics in Barcelona. He was the primary developer behind the special effect used in the lighting of the 1992 Olympic cauldron, which was famously accomplished using a fiery arrow. The arrow was tipped with a special liquid, allowing it to be set on fire and then accelerated to 130 km/h in a fraction of a second without the flame extinguishing. Antonio Rebollo shot the arrow over the Olympic cauldron, and just as the flaming arrow passed over it, the cauldron was lit remotely by Pedro Balandin using an electrical system.

He had two children with María Ruano, Óscar and César, who are also visual effect artists. He died of a heart attack at age 68.

== Partial filmography ==
- ¡Ay, Carmela! (1990)
- Beltenebros (1991)
- Días contados (1994)
- Tierra (1995)
- El día de la bestia (1995)
- Abre los ojos (1997)
- Buñuel y la mesa del rey Salomón (2001)
- El lobo (2004)
- Alatriste (2006)
- El laberinto del fauno (2006)
- Los abrazos rotos (2009)
- El cónsul de Sodoma (2009)
- Balada triste de trompeta (2010)
