= Pan's Labyrinth =

2006 film by Guillermo del Toro

- Spanish theatrical release poster
- Spanish: El laberinto del fauno
- Directed by: Guillermo del Toro
- Written by: Guillermo del Toro
- Produced by: Guillermo del Toro; Bertha Navarro; Alfonso Cuarón; Frida Torresblanco; Álvaro Augustin
- Starring: Sergi López; Maribel Verdú; Ivana Baquero; Doug Jones; Ariadna Gil; Álex Angulo
- Narrated by: Pablo Adán
- Cinematography: Guillermo Navarro
- Edited by: Bernat Vilaplana
- Music by: Javier Navarrete
- Production companies: Estudios Picasso; Tequila Gang; Esperanto Filmoj; Sententia Entertainment
- Distributed by: Warner Bros. Pictures
- Release dates: 27 May 2006 (Cannes); 11 October 2006 (Spain); 20 October 2006 (Mexico)
- Running time: 120 minutes
- Countries: Spain; Mexico
- Language: Spanish
- Budget: €14 million
- Box office: €83 million

Pan's Labyrinth (Spanish: El laberinto del fauno, lit. 'The Labyrinth of the Faun') is a 2006 Spanish-language dark fantasy film produced, written, and directed by Guillermo del Toro. The film stars Ivana Baquero, Sergi López, Maribel Verdú, Doug Jones, and Ariadna Gil. The film is an international co-production between Spain and Mexico.

The story takes place in Francoist Spain in the summer of 1944. The narrative intertwines this real world with a mythical world centered on an overgrown, abandoned labyrinth and a mysterious faun with whom the protagonist, Ofelia, interacts. Ofelia's stepfather, Captain Vidal, hunts down the Spanish Maquis who resist the Francoist regime, while Ofelia's pregnant mother grows increasingly ill. Ofelia meets several strange and magical creatures who become central to her story, leading her through the trials of the old labyrinth garden. The film employs make-up, animatronics, and CGI effects to bring life to its creatures.

Del Toro stated that he considers the story to be a parable, influenced by fairy tales. It addresses and continues themes related to his 2001 film The Devil's Backbone, to which Pan's Labyrinth is a spiritual successor, according to del Toro in his director's DVD commentary.

Pan's Labyrinth premiered on 27 May 2006 at the Cannes Film Festival, where it received a 22-minute-long standing ovation, the longest in the festival's history. The film was theatrically released by Warner Bros. Pictures in Spain on 11 October and in Mexico on 20 October. It garnered widespread critical acclaim, with praise towards its visual and makeup effects, direction, screenplay, cinematography, musical score, set design, and cast performances. It grossed $83 million at the worldwide box office and won numerous awards, including three Academy Awards, three BAFTA Awards including Best Film Not in the English Language, the Ariel Award for Best Picture, and the Hugo Award for Best Dramatic Presentation, Long Form. Pan's Labyrinth has since been considered to be Del Toro's magnum opus, one of the best fantasy films ever made, as well as one of the greatest films of the 2000s and the 21st century.

A sequel, titled 3993, was conceived by del Toro but ultimately cancelled. A novelization by del Toro and Cornelia Funke was published in 2019.

== Plot ==
In a fairy tale, Princess Moanna, daughter of the king of the underworld, visits the human world, where the sunlight blinds her and erases her memory. She becomes mortal and eventually dies. The king believes that eventually her spirit will return to the underworld, so he builds labyrinths around the world which act as portals, in preparation for her return.

In 1944 Francoist Spain, ten-year-old Ofelia travels with her pregnant mother Carmen to meet Captain Vidal, her new stepfather. Vidal, a Civil Guard officer of the Armed Police Corps and devotee of Falangism, has been assigned to hunt down the Spanish Maquis. A large stick insect, which Ofelia believes to be a fairy, leads Ofelia into an ancient stone labyrinth, but she is stopped by Vidal's housekeeper Mercedes, who is secretly supporting her brother Pedro and other members of the Maquis. That night, the insect appears in Ofelia's bedroom, where it transforms into a fairy and leads her through the labyrinth. There, she meets a faun, who believes she is the reincarnation of Princess Moanna. He gives her a book and tells her she will find in it three tasks to complete in order for her to acquire immortality and return to her kingdom. During a dinner with several important figures, Vidal announces that he will stockpile food and supplies in the granary in order to weaken the Maquis and their collaborators. The local population can only access supplies through ration cards. Vidal secures the granary with a padlock which Mercedes falsely assures him has only one key.

Ofelia completes the first task — retrieving a key from the belly of a giant toad — but becomes worried about her mother, whose condition is worsening. The faun gives Ofelia a mandrake root to place under Carmen's bed and regularly supply with blood, which seems to ease Carmen's illness. Accompanied by three fairy guides and equipped with a piece of magic chalk, Ofelia completes the second task — retrieving a dagger from the lair of the Pale Man, a child-eating monster. Despite the faun's warning not to consume anything there, she gives in to her temptation and eats two grapes, awakening the Pale Man. He devours two of the fairies but Ofelia escapes. Infuriated at her disobedience, the faun refuses to give Ofelia the third task and abandons her.

Vidal's ruthlessness becomes more evident. He interrogates and kills two local farmers (who only hunted rabbits). The Maquis attack nearby as a distraction, and steal supplies from the granary using a duplicate key. Vidal notices that the lock was opened. Vidal interrogates and tortures a captive. Doctor Ferreiro then euthanises the captive and Vidal kills Ferreiro. He later catches Ofelia tending to the mandrake root, and Carmen destroys the root as he directs. She immediately develops painful contractions and dies giving birth to Vidal's son.

Vidal grows suspicious of Mercedes, due to the unlocked door. Mercedes tries to escape with Ofelia, but they are caught. Ofelia is locked in her bedroom, while Mercedes is taken to be interrogated. Mercedes frees herself, and slashes Vidal’s mouth open before escaping to rejoin the Maquis.

The faun, having changed his mind, returns and tells her to bring her newborn brother into the labyrinth as a prerequisite for the third task. Ofelia with the baby flee into the labyrinth, pursued by Vidal, as the Maquis launch an attack on a Civil Guard outpost. Ofelia meets the faun, who says he needs to draw a tiny amount of the baby's blood with the dagger, explaining that completing the third task and opening the portal to the underworld requires the blood of an innocent. Ofelia says she would rather not return than harm her brother. Vidal finds her talking to the faun, whom he cannot see. Vidal takes the baby from Ofelia's arms before fatally shooting her.

Vidal returns to the labyrinth's entrance with the baby, where they are surrounded by the Maquis, including Mercedes and Pedro. Knowing that he will be killed, he hands the baby to Mercedes, asking that his son be told the time of his father's death. Mercedes replies that his son will not even know his name, before Vidal is shot dead. Mercedes enters the labyrinth and comforts the dying Ofelia. Drops of Ofelia's blood fall down the centre of the spiral stone staircase onto an altar.

Ofelia, well dressed and uninjured, appears in a golden throne room. The King of the underworld tells her that, by choosing to spill her own innocent blood rather than that of another, she passed the final test. The faun praises Ofelia for her choice, addressing her as "Your Highness". Her mother, the Queen of the underworld, invites Ofelia to sit next to her father and rule at his side as the people around them applaud. Back in the stone labyrinth, Ofelia smiles as she dies.

The epilogue concludes the tale of Princess Moanna, stating that she ruled the underworld with kindness and justice for many centuries, and left little traces of her time in the human realm, "visible only to those who know where to look."

== Cast ==
- Ivana Baquero as Ofelia / Princess Moanna, a child who comes to believe she is the reincarnation of a princess from the underworld. Del Toro said he was nervous about casting the lead role, and that finding the 10-year-old Spanish actress was purely accidental. (The film was shot from June–October 2005, when she was 11.) "The character I wrote was initially younger, about 8 or 9, and Ivana came in and she was a little older than the character, with this curly hair which I never imagined the girl having. But I loved her first reading, my wife was crying and the camera woman was crying after her reading and I knew hands down Ivana was the best actress that had shown up, yet I knew that I needed to change the screenplay to accommodate her age." Baquero says that Del Toro sent her many comics and fairy tales to help her "get more into the atmosphere of Ofelia and more into what she felt". She says she thought the film was "marvelous", and that "at the same time it can bring you pain, and sadness, and scariness, and happiness".
- Sergi López as Captain Vidal, Ofelia's new stepfather who serves as captain in the Armed Police Corps and is a devotee of Falangism. Del Toro met with López in Barcelona, a year and a half before filming began, to ask him to play Vidal. In parts of Spain, López was considered a melodramatic or comedic actor, and the Madrid-based producers told del Toro, "You should be very careful because you don't know about these things because you're Mexican, but this guy is not going to be able to deliver the performance"; del Toro replied "Well, it's not that I don't know, it's that I don't care". Of his character, López said: "He is the most evil character I've ever played in my career. It is impossible to improve upon it; the character is so solid and so well written. Vidal is deranged, a psychopath who is impossible to defend. Even though his father's personality marked his existence—and is certainly one of the reasons for his mental disorder—that cannot be an excuse. It would seem to be very cynical to use that to justify or explain his cruel and cowardly acts. I think it is great that the film does not consider any justification of fascism."
- Maribel Verdú as Mercedes, Vidal's housekeeper. Del Toro selected Verdú to play the compassionate revolutionary because he "saw a sadness in her which he thought would be perfect for the part".
- Doug Jones as the Faun and the Pale Man. As the Faun, Jones guides Ofelia to the fantasy world. As the Pale Man, he plays a grotesque monster with an appetite for children. Jones had previously worked with del Toro on Mimic and Hellboy, and said the director sent him an email saying, "You must be in this film. No one else can play this part but you." Jones responded enthusiastically to an English translation of the script, but then found out the film was in Spanish, a language he did not speak. Jones says he was "terrified" and del Toro suggested learning the script phonetically, but Jones rejected this, preferring to learn the words himself. He said, "I really, really buckled down and committed myself to learning that word for word and I got the pronunciation semi-right before I even went in," using the five hours a day he spent getting the costume and make-up on to practice the words. Del Toro later decided to dub Jones with the voice of Pablo Adán, "an authoritative theatre actor", but Jones's efforts remained valuable because the voice actor was able to match his delivery with Jones's mouth movements. Jones's dual casting is intended to suggest that the Pale Man (along with the toad) is either a creation of the Faun or the Faun himself in another form.
- Ariadna Gil as Carmen / Queen of the Underworld, Ofelia's mother and Vidal's wife.
- Álex Angulo as Doctor Ferreiro, a doctor in the service of Vidal, but an anti-Francoist.
- Manolo Solo as Garcés, one of Vidal's lieutenants.
- César Vea as Serrano, one of Vidal's lieutenants.
- Roger Casamajor as Pedro, Mercedes' brother and one of the Maquis.
- Federico Luppi as King of the Underworld, Ofelia's father.
- Pablo Adán as Narrator / Voice of Faun.

== Production ==
=== Influences ===
The original Spanish title El laberinto del fauno refers to the fauns of Roman mythology, while the English, German and French titles refer specifically to the faun-like Greek deity Pan. However, del Toro has stated that the faun in the film is not Pan. The idea for Pan's Labyrinth came from Guillermo del Toro's notebooks, which he says are filled with "doodles, ideas, drawings and plot bits". He had been keeping these notebooks for twenty years. At one point during production, he left the notebook in a taxi in London and was distraught, but the cabbie returned it to him two days later. Though he originally wrote a story about a pregnant woman who falls in love with a faun, Sergi López said that del Toro described the final version of the plot a year and a half before filming. López said that "for two hours and a half he explained to me all the movie, but with all the details, it was incredible, and when he finished I said, 'You have a script?' He said, 'No, nothing is written'". López agreed to act in the movie and received the script one year later; he said that "it was exactly the same, it was incredible. In his little head he had all the history with a lot of little detail, a lot of characters, like now when you look at the movie, it was exactly what he had in his head".

Del Toro got the idea of the faun from childhood experiences with "lucid dreaming". He stated on Charlie Rose that every midnight, he would wake up, and a faun would gradually step out from behind the grandfather's clock. Originally, the faun was supposed to be a classic half-man, half-goat faun fraught with beauty. But in the end, the faun was altered into a goat-faced creature almost completely made out of earth, moss, vines, and tree bark. He became a mysterious, semi-suspicious relic who gave both the impression of trustworthiness and many signs that warn someone to never confide in him at all.

Del Toro has said the film has strong connections in theme to The Devil's Backbone and should be seen as an informal sequel dealing with some of the issues raised there. Fernando Tielve and Íñigo Garcés, who played the protagonists of The Devil's Backbone, make cameo appearances as unnamed guerrilla soldiers in Pan's Labyrinth. Some of the other works he drew on for inspiration include Lewis Carroll's Alice books, Jorge Luis Borges' Ficciones, Arthur Machen's The Great God Pan and The White People, Lord Dunsany's The Blessing of Pan, Algernon Blackwood's Pan's Garden and Francisco Goya's works. In 2004, del Toro said: "Pan is an original story. Some of my favourite writers (Borges, Blackwood, Machen, Dunsany) have explored the figure of the god Pan and the symbol of the labyrinth. These are things that I find very compelling and I am trying to mix them and play with them." It was also influenced by the illustrations of Arthur Rackham.

Del Toro wanted to include a fairy tale about a dragon for Ofelia to narrate to her unborn brother. The tale involved the dragon, named Varanium Silex, who guarded a mountain surrounded by thorns, but at its peak is a blue rose that can grant immortality. The dragon and the thorns ward off many men though, who decide it is better to avoid pain than to be given immortality. Although the scene was thematically important, it was cut short for budget reasons.

There are differing ideas about the film's religious influences. Del Toro himself has said that he considers Pan's Labyrinth "a truly profane film, a layman's riff on Catholic dogma", but that his friend Alejandro González Iñárritu described it as "a truly Catholic film". Del Toro's explanation is "once a Catholic, always a Catholic," however he also admits that the Pale Man's preference for children rather than the feast in front of him is intended as a criticism of the Catholic Church. Additionally, the priest's words during the torture scene were taken as a direct quote from a priest who offered communion to political prisoners during the Spanish Civil War: "Remember my sons, you should confess what you know because God doesn't care what happens to your bodies; He already saved your souls."

In regard to whether or not the fantasy underworld was real or a product of Ofelia's imagination, del Toro stated in an interview that, while he believes it is real, the movie "should tell something different to everyone. It should be a matter of personal discussion". He then mentioned there were several clues in the movie indicating the underworld was indeed real.

The film was shot in a scots pine forest situated in the Guadarrama mountain range, Central Spain. Guillermo Navarro, the director of photography, said that "after doing work in Hollywood on other movies and with other directors, working in our original language in different scenery brings me back to the original reasons I wanted to make movies, which is basically to tell stories with complete freedom and to let the visuals really contribute to the telling of the story".

The pale man's eyes on his hands are a feature shared by the Japanese mythological monster the Tenome (a name which means "hand eyes").

=== Effects ===
Pan's Labyrinth employs some computer-generated imagery in its effects, but it mostly uses complex make-up and animatronics. The giant toad was inspired by The Maze. Del Toro himself performed the noises. The mandrake root is a combination of animatronics and CGI. Del Toro wanted the fairies "to look like little monkeys, like dirty fairies", but the animation company had the idea to give them wings made of leaves.

Jones spent an average of five hours sitting in the makeup chair as his team of David Martí, Montse Ribé and Xavi Bastida applied the makeup for the Faun, which was mostly latex foam. The last piece to be applied was the pair of horns, which weighed ten pounds and were extremely tiring to wear. The legs were a unique design, with Jones standing on 20-cm-high lifts (8 in), and the legs of the Faun attached to his own. His lower leg was eventually digitally erased in post-production. The Faun's flapping ears and blinking eyes were remotely operated by David Martí and Xavi Bastida from DDT Efectos Especiales while on set. Del Toro told Jones to "go rock star... like a glam rocker. But less David Bowie, more Mick Jagger".

The Captain's room, as shown in the scene where Captain Vidal is shaving, is supposed to resemble his father's watch, which del Toro says represents his troubled mind.

A bout of weight loss on del Toro's part inspired the physical appearance of the saggy-skinned Pale Man. In order to see while performing the part, Doug Jones had to look out of the character's nostrils, and its legs were attached to Jones over the green leotard which he wore.

=== Subtitles ===
The film uses subtitles for its translation into other languages, including English. Del Toro wrote them himself, because he was disappointed with the subtitles of his previous Spanish-language film, The Devil's Backbone. In an interview, he said that the subtitles of The Devil's Backbone were "for the thinking impaired" and "incredibly bad". He spent a month working with two other people, and said that he did not want it to "feel like... watching a subtitled film".

== Soundtrack ==
The score for Pan's Labyrinth by Spanish composer Javier Navarrete was nominated for an Academy Award. It was entirely structured around a lullaby, and del Toro had the entire score included on the soundtrack album, even though much of it had been cut during production. The album was released on 19 December 2006. Its cover art was an unused Drew Struzan promotional poster for the film.

== Marketing ==
After Mimic, Del Toro wanted his outreach to go beyond Hollywood film-making as he felt was too secure and restrictive what he was "allowed" to make from the perspective of producers. Though American producers offered to double the budget to make Pan's Labyrinth in English and shot in the US, Del Toro still refused, stating the film would have become a "Euro-trash production," and a result it ended up as an independent project. Though challenging to promote outside of Spanish speaking countries with a budget of only USD 19 million, it earned $30 million within just two months of its U.S. opening to become the highest grossing Spanish-language film ever released in the U.S.

Bob Berney, the president of Picturehouse, was in charge of promotional material for distribution in the US. He commented the target audiences were young males through TV commercials and later a panel discussion at San Diego Comic-Con and Latino communities through TV spots, posters, newspaper ads in Spanish, and mainstream radio stations such as KROQ.

== Distribution ==
Pan's Labyrinth was premiered at the 2006 Cannes Film Festival on 27 May 2006. Wild Bunch handled international sales, with Warner Bros. Pictures acquiring the Spanish and Latin American distribution rights to the film. In January 2006, Picturehouse had acquired the North American distribution rights to the film for $6 million. Its first premiere in an English-speaking country was at the London FrightFest Film Festival on 25 August 2006. Its first general release was in Spain on 11 October 2006, followed by a release in Mexico nine days later. On 24 November 2006 it had its first general English release in the United Kingdom; that month it was also released in France, Serbia, Belgium, Italy, Russia, Singapore and South Korea. It had a limited release in Canada and the United States on 29 December 2006, before going wide in Canada and the United States on 19 January 2007, in Australia on 18 January 2007, in Taiwan on 27 April 2007, in Slovenia on 17 May 2007 and in Japan on 29 September 2007. Its widest release in the United States was in 1,143 cinemas.

The film was released on DVD on 12 March 2007 in the United Kingdom by Optimum Releasing in a two-disc special edition. The film was released in the United States on 15 May 2007 from New Line Home Entertainment in both single-disc and double-disc special edition versions, featuring an additional DTS-ES audio track not present on the UK version. Additionally, the film received a special limited-edition release in South Korea and Germany. Only 20,000 copies of this edition were manufactured. It is presented in a digipak designed to look like The Book of Crossroads, the magical fairy tale book given to Ofelia by the Faun in the movie. The Korean first edition contains two DVDs along with an art book and replica of Ofelia's key. The German special limited edition contains three DVDs and a book containing the movie's storyboard. Pan's Labyrinth was released for download on 22 June 2007 from Channel 4's on-demand service, 4oD.

High-definition versions of Pan's Labyrinth were released in December 2007 on both Blu-ray Disc and HD DVD formats. New Line stated that due to their announcement of supporting Blu-ray exclusively, thus dropping HD DVD support with immediate effect, Pan's Labyrinth would be the only HD DVD release for the studio, and would be discontinued after current stock was depleted. Both versions had a PiP commentary while web extras were exclusive to the HD DVD version. In October 2016, The Criterion Collection re-released the film on Blu-ray in the US, based on a newly graded 2K digital master supervised by del Toro. An Ultra HD Blu-ray edition of the film was released on October 1, 2019, by Warner Bros. Home Entertainment remastered for 4K.

In November 2025, the film's North American distribution rights were acquired by Cineverse. In April 2026, Cineverse announced that it was partnering with Fathom Events for the film's 20th anniversary re-release scheduled for October 9, coinciding with del Toro's 62nd birthday. In May 2026, it was announced that a 4K restoration of the film would premiere in the Cannes Classics section of the 2026 Cannes Film Festival on May 12. That same month, StudioCanal, which already held U.K. and Irish distribution rights to the film, acquired international sales rights outside Latin America to it, planning to re-release the film in the U.K., France, Germany, the Benelux and Australia sometime in the fall; Cinépolis Distribución holds distribution rights for Latin America.

In July 2026, del Toro discussed the 3D conversion at San Diego Comic-Con, stating that it was completed by hand without the use of artificial intelligence. He said that he chose the more time-consuming manual process so that individual decisions about depth would be made by human artists, describing the approach as a way of protecting the artistic craft of filmmaking.

== Reception ==
=== Critical response ===
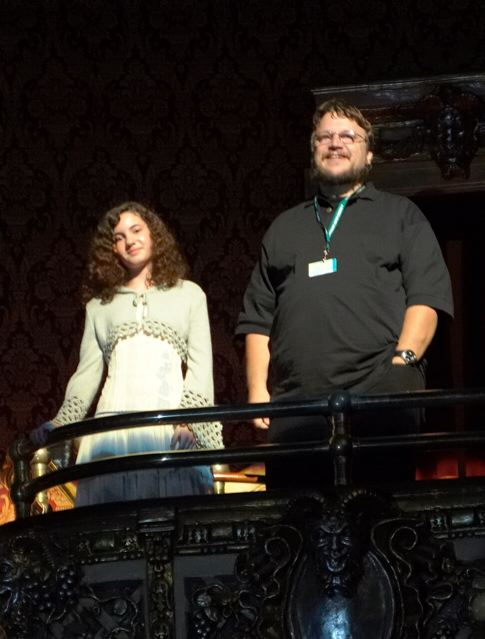
Ivana Baquero and Guillermo del Toro at the Elgin Theatre in Toronto

Rotten Tomatoes gives the film a score of 95% based on 240 reviews and an average rating of 8.9/10. The site's consensus reads "Pan's Labyrinth is Alice in Wonderland for grown-ups, with the horrors of both reality and fantasy blended together into an extraordinary, spellbinding fable." Based on reviews from 37 critics, it received a 98/100 score at Metacritic, indicating "universal acclaim", making it Metacritic's best-reviewed film of the 2000s decade. At its Cannes Film Festival release, it received a 22–minute standing ovation, the longest in the festival's history. It also received a standing ovation at the 2006 Toronto International Film Festival, its first release in the Americas.

Mark Kermode, in The Observer, labeled Pan's Labyrinth the best film of 2006, describing it as "an epic, poetic vision in which the grim realities of war are matched and mirrored by a descent into an underworld populated by fearsomely beautiful monsters". Stephanie Zacharek wrote that the film "works on so many levels that it seems to change shape even as you watch it", and Jim Emerson of Chicago Sun-Times called it "a fairy tale of such potency and awesome beauty that it reconnects the adult imagination to the primal thrill and horror of the stories that held us spellbound as children". In his review, Roger Ebert deemed it "one of the greatest of all fantasy films, even though it is anchored so firmly in the reality of war". The New Yorker's Anthony Lane took special note of the film's sound design, saying it "discards any hint of the ethereal by turning up the volume on small, supercharged noises".

Writing for The San Diego Union-Tribune, David Elliott was more mixed on the film, opining that "the excitement is tangible" but "what it lacks is successful unity ... Del Toro has the art of many parts, but only makes them cohere as a sort of fevered extravaganza".

=== Commercial performance ===
During its limited first three weeks at the United States box office, the film made $5.4 million. As of 2021, it has grossed $37.6 million in North America and $46.2 million in other territories, for a total of $83.9 million worldwide. In Spain, it grossed almost $12 million, and it is the fifth highest grossing foreign film in the United States.

In the United States, it has generated $55 million from its DVD sales and rentals.

In the United Kingdom, it was 2011's eighth best-selling foreign-language film on physical home video formats. It was later the UK's tenth best-selling foreign-language film on physical home video formats in 2012. On UK television, it was 2013's second most-watched foreign-language film, with 200,700 viewers on Channel 4.

=== Awards and nominations ===
| Award | Category | Recipient | Result |
|---|---|---|---|
| 79th Academy Awards | Best Original Screenplay | Guillermo del Toro | Nominated |
| 79th Academy Awards | Best Foreign Language Film | Mexico | Nominated |
| 79th Academy Awards | Best Art Direction | Art Direction: Eugenio Caballero; Set Decoration: Pilar Revuelta | Won |
| 79th Academy Awards | Best Cinematography | Guillermo Navarro | Won |
| 79th Academy Awards | Best Makeup | David Martí and Montse Ribé | Won |
| 79th Academy Awards | Best Original Score | Javier Navarrete | Nominated |
| 16th Actors and Actresses Union Awards | Best Film Actress in a Leading Role | Maribel Verdú | Nominated |
| 16th Actors and Actresses Union Awards | Best Film Actor in a Leading Role | Sergi López | Nominated |
| 16th Actors and Actresses Union Awards | Best New Actress | Ivana Baquero | Won |
| British Academy Film Awards | Best Film Not in the English Language | Guillermo del Toro | Won |
| British Academy Film Awards | Best Original Screenplay | Guillermo del Toro | Nominated |
| British Academy Film Awards | Best Cinematography | Guillermo Navarro | Nominated |
| British Academy Film Awards | Best Production Design | Eugenio Caballero and Pilar Revuelta | Nominated |
| British Academy Film Awards | Best Costume Design | Lala Huete | Won |
| British Academy Film Awards | Best Sound | Martin Hernández, Jaime Baksht, and Miguel Ángel Polo | Nominated |
| British Academy Film Awards | Best Makeup and Hair | David Martí and Montse Ribé | Won |
| British Academy Film Awards | Best Special Visual Effects | Edward Irastorza, Everett Burrell, David Martí, and Montse Ribé | Nominated |
| Golden Globe Awards | Best Foreign Language Film | Mexico | Nominated |
| 21st Goya Awards | Best Film | | Nominated |
| 21st Goya Awards | Best Director | Guillermo del Toro | Nominated |
| 21st Goya Awards | Best Actor | Sergi López | Nominated |
| 21st Goya Awards | Best Actress | Maribel Verdú | Nominated |
| 21st Goya Awards | Best New Actress | Ivana Baquero | Won |
| 21st Goya Awards | Best Original Screenplay | Guillermo del Toro | Won |
| 21st Goya Awards | Best Cinematography | Guillermo Navarro | Won |
| 21st Goya Awards | Best Production Design | Eugenio Caballero | Nominated |
| 21st Goya Awards | Best Makeup and Hairstyles | José Quetglas and Blanca Sánchez | Won |
| 21st Goya Awards | Best Editing | Bernat Villaplana | Won |
| 21st Goya Awards | Best Sound | Miguel Polo | Won |
| 21st Goya Awards | Best Music | Javier Navarrete | Nominated |
| 21st Goya Awards | Best Special Effects | David Martí, Montse Ribé, Reyes Abades, Everett Burrell, Edward Irastorza and Emilio Ruiz | Won |
| Ariel Awards | Best Director | Guillermo del Toro | Won |
| Ariel Awards | Best Actress | Maribel Verdú | Won |
| Ariel Awards | Best Supporting Actor | Álex Angulo | Nominated |
| Ariel Awards | Best Cinematography | Guillermo Navarro | Won |
| Ariel Awards | Best Production Design | Eugenio Caballero | Won |
| Ariel Awards | Best Costume Design | Lala Huete | Won |
| Ariel Awards | Best Makeup | José Quetglas and Blanca Sánchez | Won |
| Ariel Awards | Best Editing | Bernat Villaplana | Nominated |
| Ariel Awards | Best Sound | Miguel Polo | Nominated |
| Ariel Awards | Best Original Score | Javier Navarrete | Nominated |
| Ariel Awards | Best Special Effects | David Martí, Montse Ribé, Reyes Abades, Everett Burrell, Edward Irastorza and Emilio Ruiz | Won |
| Fantasporto | Best Film | | Won |
| Fantasporto | Best Actor | Sergi López | Won |
| 12th Forqué Awards | Best Film | | Won |
| Spacey Awards | Space Choice Awards for Best Movie | | Won |
| Constellation Awards | Best Science Fiction Film, TV Movie, or Mini-Series of 2006 | | Won |
| Belgian Film Critics Association | Grand Prix | | Nominated |
| Hugo Award | Best Dramatic Presentation, Long Form | | Won |
| BBC Four World Cinema Awards | BBC Four World Cinema Award | | Won |
| Nebula Award | Best Script | Guillermo del Toro | Won |
| National Society of Film Critics | Best Film | | Won |
| National Society of Film Critics | Best Director | Guillermo del Toro | Nominated |
| National Society of Film Critics | Best Cinematography | Guillermo Navarro | Nominated |
| Saturn Awards | Best International Film | | Won |
| Saturn Awards | Best Director | Guillermo del Toro | Nominated |
| Saturn Awards | Best Writing | Guillermo del Toro | Nominated |
| Saturn Awards | Best Supporting Actor | Sergi López | Nominated |
| Saturn Awards | Best Performance by a Younger Actor | Ivana Baquero | Won |
| Saturn Awards | Best Make-up | David Martí and Montse Ribé | Nominated |

Metacritic named it the best reviewed film of the decade" in 2010. It is #17 on the BBC list of best 100 films of the 21st century. In 2021, members of Writers Guild of America West (WGAW) and Writers Guild of America, East (WGAE) ranked its screenplay 36th in WGA’s 101 Greatest Screenplays of the 21st Century (So Far). In 2025, the film ranked number 54 on The New York Times' list of "The 100 Best Movies of the 21st Century" and number 39 on the "Readers' Choice" edition of the list.

=== Top 10 lists ===
The film appeared on many critics' top ten lists of the best films of 2006.

- 1st – Mark Kermode, The Observer
- 1st – Andrew O'Hehir, Salon
- 1st – Roger Ebert, Chicago Sun-Times
- 1st – Marjorie Baumgarten, The Austin Chronicle
- 1st – Richard Corliss, TIME magazine
- 1st – Shawn Levy, The Oregonian
- 1st – Staff, Film Threat
- 2nd – Empire
- 2nd – A. O. Scott, The New York Times
- 2nd – Ann Hornaday, The Washington Post
- 2nd – Jack Mathews, New York Daily News
- 2nd – Marc Savlov, The Austin Chronicle
- 2nd – Peter Hartlaub, San Francisco Chronicle
- 2nd – Stephen Holden, The New York Times
- 3rd – Keith Phipps, The A.V. Club
- 3rd – Lawrence Toppman, The Charlotte Observer
- 3rd – Lisa Schwarzbaum, Entertainment Weekly
- 3rd – Ray Bennett, The Hollywood Reporter
- 3rd – Rene Rodriguez, The Miami Herald
- 3rd – Richard James Havis, The Hollywood Reporter
- 4th – Stephanie Zacharek, Salon
- 5th – Michael Wilmington, Chicago Tribune
- 6th – Glenn Kenny, Premiere
- 6th – Noel Murray, The A.V. Club
- 7th – Claudia Puig, USA Today
- 8th – Kenneth Turan, Los Angeles Times (tied with Children of Men)
- 9th – Kevin Crust, Los Angeles Times (tied with Babel)
- 9th – Kirk Honeycutt, The Hollywood Reporter

Unranked Top 10

- Ty Burr, The Boston Globe
- Dana Stevens, Slate
- Joe Morgenstern, The Wall Street Journal
- Liam Lacey and Rick Groen, The Globe and Mail
- Ruthe Stein, San Francisco Chronicle
- Steven Rea, The Philadelphia Inquirer

Ranked No. 5 in Empire magazine's "The 100 Best Films of World Cinema" in 2010.

=== Comparisons to other films ===
==== Spanish films ====
Del Toro himself has indicated similarities with The Spirit of the Beehive, filmed in Francoist Spain, which juxtaposes issues related to the Civil War with horror film. At least one critic has made a connection to a second Spanish film, Cría Cuervos (1975, Carlos Saura), again made while Franco was still in power. Doug Cummings (Film Journey 2007) identifies the connection between Cria Cuervos, Spirit of the Beehive and Pan's Labyrinth: "Critics have been summarily referencing Spirit of the Beehive (1973) in reviews of Pan's Labyrinth, but Saura's film–at once a sister work to Erice's classic in theme, tone, even shared actress (Ana Torrent)–is no less rich a reference point."

==== Non-Spanish films ====
In a 2007 interview, del Toro noted the striking similarities between his film and Walt Disney Pictures' The Chronicles of Narnia: both films are set around the same time, have similar child-age principal characters, mythic creatures (particularly the fauns), and themes of "disobedience and choice". Says del Toro: "This is my version of that universe, not only 'Narnia', but that universe of children's literature." In fact, del Toro was asked to direct The Chronicles of Narnia: The Lion, the Witch and the Wardrobe but turned it down for Pan's Labyrinth. In addition to Narnia, Pan's Labyrinth has also been compared to films such as Labyrinth, MirrorMask, Spirited Away and Bridge to Terabithia.

== Cancelled sequel ==
In November 2007, del Toro confirmed that a sequel, titled 3993, was in production. Del Toro scrapped the project after deciding to direct Hellboy II: The Golden Army.

== See also ==
- List of submissions to the 79th Academy Awards for Best Foreign Language Film
- List of Mexican submissions for the Academy Award for Best Foreign Language Film
