= Montse Ribé =

Spanish make-up artist and actress

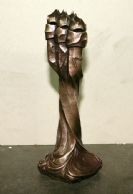
- Born: 1972 (age 53–54); Barcelona, Catalonia

Montse Ribé (born 1972) is a Spanish make-up artist and actress. She won the Academy Award for Best Makeup for her work in Pan's Labyrinth (2006). She was one of 115 people invited to join the Academy of Motion Picture Arts and Sciences in 2007.

She portrayed young Red/Hellboy in the movie Hellboy II: The Golden Army.
