= List of Spanish films of 2003 =

A list of Spanish-produced and co-produced feature films released in Spain in 2003. The domestic theatrical release date is favoured.

== Films ==
Release		Title (Domestic title)	Cast & Crew	Ref.
J A N U A R Y	10	South from Granada (Al sur de Granada)	Director: Fernando Colomo Cast: Matthew Goode, Verónica Sánchez, Antonio Resines, Ángela Molina, James Fleet, Consuelo Trujillo, Laurence Fox, Jessica Kate Meyer	
J A N U A R Y	10	I Won't Let You Not Love Me (No dejaré que no me quieras)	Director: José Luis Acosta Cast: Pere Ponce, Alberto San Juan, Viviana Saccone, Ana Risueño	
J A N U A R Y	17	The Witch Affair (Cosa de brujas)	Director: José Miguel Juárez Cast: José Sancho, Manuela Arcuri, Antonio Hortelano, Alberto San Juan	
J A N U A R Y	31	The End of a Mystery (La luz prodigiosa)	Director: Miguel Hermoso Cast: Alfredo Landa, Nino Manfredi, Kiti Manver, José Luis Gómez	
F E B R U A R Y	7	Mortadelo & Filemon: The Big Adventure (La gran aventura de Mortadelo y Filemón)	Director: Javier Fesser Cast: Benito Pocino, Pepe Viyuela, Dominique Pinon, Paco Sagarzazu, María Isbert, Janfri Topera, Berta Ojea, Mariano Venancio	
M A R C H	7	My Life Without Me (Mi vida sin mí)	Director: Isabel Coixet Cast: Sarah Polley, Amanda Plummer, Scott Speedman, Leonor Watling, Deborah Harry, Mark Ruffalo, Sonja Bennett, Alfred Molina, Jessica Amlee, Kenya Jo Kennedy, Maria de Medeiros, Deanne Henry	
M A R C H	21	Soldiers of Salamina (Soldados de Salamina)	Director: David Trueba Cast: Ariadna Gil, María Botto, Joan Dalmau	
M A R C H	21	Utopia (Utopía)	Director: María Ripoll Cast: Leonardo Sbaraglia, Najwa Nimri, Tchéky Karyo, Emma Vilarasau, Héctor Alterio, Fele Martínez	
M A R C H	28	Moscow Gold (El oro de Moscú)	Director: Jesús Bonilla Cast: Jesús Bonilla, Santiago Segura, Alfredo Landa, Concha Velasco, Gabino Diego, Antonio Resines, Neus Asensi, Juan Luis Galiardo, Chiquito de la Calzada, José Luis López Vázquez, María Barranco, Antonio Gamero, Bebe Rebolledo	
A P R I L	25	The Carpenter's Pencil (El lápiz del carpintero)	Director: Antón Reixa Cast: Tristán Ulloa, Luis Tosar, María Adánez, Nancho Novo, María Pujalte, Manuel Manquiña, Anne Igartiburu, Maxo Barjas, Carlos Sobera, Sergio Pazos	
A P R I L	25	Stormy Weather (Tiempo de tormenta)	Director: Pedro Olea Cast: Maribel Verdú, Jorge Sanz, Darío Grandinetti, María Barranco	
A P R I L	30	Torremolinos 73	Director: Pablo Berger Cast: Javier Cámara, Candela Peña, Juan Diego, Fernando Tejero, Mads Mikkelsen, Malena Alterio, Ramón Barea, Nuria González, Thomas Bo Larsen, Tina Sainz	
A P R I L	30	Killing Words (Palabras encadenadas)	Director: Laura Mañá Cast: Darío Grandinetti, Goya Toledo	
A P R I L	30	Bulgarian Lovers (Los novios búlgaros)	Director: Eloy de la Iglesia Cast: Fernando Guillén Cuervo, Dritan Biba, Pepón Nieto	
M A Y	9	Life Marks (La vida mancha)	Director: Enrique Urbizu Cast: José Coronado, Zay Nuba, Juan Sanz, Sandro Polo, Yohana Cobo, Silvia Espigado, Alfonso Torregrosa, Enrique Martínez, Gabriel Moreno, May Pascual, Cesáreo Estébanez	
J U N E	6	The Hours of the Day (Las horas del día)	Director: Jaime Rosales Cast: Alex Brendemül, Vicente Romero, María Antonia Martínez, Ágata Roca, Pape Monsoriu	
J U N E	6	El furgón	Director: Benito Rabal Cast: Sancho Gracia, Pablo Carbonell, Carlos Fuentes, Elsa Pataky	
J U L Y	18	Silvia's Gift (El regalo de Silvia)	Director: Dionisio Pérez Cast: Luis Tosar, Víctor Clavijo, Bárbara Goenaga, Adriana Domínguez, María Bouzas, Ginés García Millán	
J U L Y	25	Beyond Re-Animator	Director: Brian Yuzna Cast: Jeffrey Combs, Jason Barry, Elsa Pataky, Simón Andreu, Santiago Segura, Enrique Arce	
A U G U S T	22	Chill Out! (Descongélate!)	Director: Félix Sabroso, Dunia Ayaso Cast: Pepón Nieto, Candela Peña, Loles León, Rubén Ochandiano	
S E P T E M B E R	5	Two Tough Guys (Dos tipos duros)	Director: Juan Martínez Moreno Cast: Antonio Resines, Elena Anaya, Rosa María Sardá, Jordi Vilches	
S E P T E M B E R	5	Where Is Madame Catherine? (Las manos vacías)	Director: Marc Recha Cast: Eduardo Noriega, Olivier Gourmet, Mireille Perrier, Jérémie Lippmann, Pierre Berriau, Eulalia Ramón, Mireia Ros, Dominique Marcas	
S E P T E M B E R	19	Football Days (Días de fútbol)	Director: David Serrano Cast: Ernesto Alterio, Alberto San Juan, Natalia Verbeke, María Esteve, Fernando Tejero, Nathalie Poza	
S E P T E M B E R	26	November (Noviembre)	Director: Achero Mañas Cast: Óscar Jaenada, Ingrid Rubio, Paloma Lorena, Juan Díaz, Juan Margallo, Javier Ríos, Ángel Facio, Adriana Domínguez, Amparo Valle, Jordi Pedrosa, Fernando Conde, Juanma Rodríguez, Juan Diego, Nuria Gago, Amparo Baró, Héctor Alterio	
S E P T E M B E R	26	The Galíndez File (El misterio Galíndez)	Director: Gerardo Herrero Cast: Harvey Keitel, Saffron Burrows, Eduard Fernández, Guillermo Toledo, Reynaldo Miravalles, Chete Lera, Txema Blasco	
S E P T E M B E R	26	Danube Hotel (Hotel Danubio)	Director: Antonio Giménez-Rico Cast: Santiago Ramos, Carmen Morales, Mariola Fuentes, Iñaki Miramón, Juan Jesús Valverde, José Sazatornil "Saza"	
O C T O B E R	3	Carmen	Director: Vicente Aranda Cast: Paz Vega, Leonardo Sbaraglia	
O C T O B E R	3	The Basque Ball: Skin Against Stone (La pelota vasca. La piel contra la piedra/ Euskal pilota, larrua harriaren kontra)	Director: Julio Medem	
O C T O B E R	10	Take My Eyes (Te doy mis ojos)	Director: Icíar Bollaín Cast: Laia Marull, Luis Tosar, Candela Peña, Rosa María Sardá, Sergi Calleja	
O C T O B E R	17	With George Bush on My Mind (Los abajo firmantes)	Director: Joaquín Oristrell Cast: Elvira Mínguez, María Botto, Javier Cámara, Juan Diego Botto, José Manuel Cervino	
O C T O B E R	31	The 4th Floor (Planta 4ª)	Director: Antonio Mercero Cast: Juan José Ballesta, Luis Ángel Priego, Gorka Moreno, Alejandro Zafra, Marco Martínez, Marcos Cedillo, Maite Jáuregui, Luis Barbería, Monti Castiñeira, Miguel Foronda	
O C T O B E R	31	Dot the i (El punto sobre la i)	Director: Matthew Parkhill Cast: Gael García Bernal, Natalia Verbeke, James D'Arcy	
N O V E M B E R	7	In the City (En la ciudad)	Director: Cesc Gay Cast: Mónica López, Chisco Amado, Eduard Fernández, Àlex Brendemühl, Vicenta Ndongo	
N O V E M B E R	7	Flying Saucers (Platillos volantes)	Director: Óscar Aibar Cast: Jordi Vilches, Ángel de Andrés López, Leo Bassi, Pere Ponce, José Luis Adserías, Àngels Poch, Macarena Gómez, Xavier Serrat, Manel Castillejos	
N O V E M B E R	21	Sleeping Luck (La suerte dormida)	Director: Ángeles González-Sinde Cast: Adriana Ozores, Félix Gómez, Pepe Soriano, Carlos Kaniowsky, Fanny de Castro, Chani Martín, Antonio Muñoz de Mesa, Josu Ormaetxe, Pilar Castro, Joaquín Climent, Francesc Orella	
N O V E M B E R	21	The Best Thing That Can Happen to a Croissant (Lo mejor que le puede pasar a un cruasán)	Director: Paco Mir Cast: Pablo Carbonell, Marta Belaustegui, José Coronado, Nathalie Seseña	
D E C E M B E R	19	El Cid: The Legend (El Cid, la leyenda)	Director: José Pozo	

== Box office ==
The ten highest-grossing Spanish films in 2003, by domestic box office gross revenue, are as follows:

Highest-grossing films of 2003
Rank	Title	Distributor	Admissions	Domestic gross (€)
1	Mortadelo & Filemon: The Big Adventure (La gran aventura de Mortadelo y Filemón)	Warner Sogefilms	4,979,991	22,827,620.68
2	Football Days (Días de fútbol)	Disney	2,424,949	11,617,115.23
3	Carmen	Disney	1,353,848	6,299,854.29
4	Moscow Gold (El oro de Moscú)	Columbia TriStar	1,259,269	5,807,869.17
5	The 4th Floor (Planta 4ª)	Disney	930,970	4,492,457.19
6	Take My Eyes (Te doy mis ojos)	Alta Classics	682,267	3,289,523.38
7	My Life Without Me (Mi vida sin mí)	Warner Sogefilms	530,568	2,499,596.66
8	South from Granada (Al sur de Granada)	Warner Sogefilms	506,539	2,352,662.42
9	Mondays in the Sun (Los lunes al sol) ‡	Warner Sogefilms	473,650	2,076,250.16
10	Soldiers of Salamina (Soldados de Salamina)	Lolafilms	424,967	2,023,967.75
‡: 2002 theatrical opening

== See also ==
- 18th Goya Awards
