= Every Side of the Bed =

- Theatrical release poster
- Spanish: Todos los lados de la cama
- Directed by: Samantha López Speranza
- Screenplay by: Carlos del Hoyo; Irene Bohoyo
- Produced by: Álvaro Augustin; Ghislain Barrois; Tomás Cimadevilla; Eduardo Sainz de Vicuña
- Starring: Ernesto Alterio; Pilar Castro; Jan Buxaderas; Lucía Caraballo
- Production companies: Telecinco Cinema; Weekend Studio; Impala; Lightbox Animation Studios
- Distributed by: Buena Vista International
- Release dates: November 2025 (Seville); 14 November 2025 (Spain)
- Running time: 112 minutes
- Country: Spain
- Language: Spanish

Every Side of the Bed (Spanish: Todos los lados de la cama) is a 2025 Spanish musical comedy film directed by Samantha López Speranza from a screenplay by Carlos del Hoyo and Irene Bohoyo. It is a sequel to box-office hits The Other Side of the Bed (2002) and The 2 Sides of the Bed (2005). It stars Ernesto Alterio, Pilar Castro, Jan Buxaderas, and Lucía Caraballo.

It was presented at the 22nd Seville European Film Festival ahead of its 14 November 2025 theatrical release in Spain by Buena Vista International.

== Plot ==
After finding out that their respective children Óscar and Julia and are in a heteronormative and monogamous relationship and plan to marry, Javier and Carlota seek to avert the wedding.

== Cast ==
- Ernesto Alterio as Javier
- Pilar Castro as Carlota
- Jan Buxaderas as Óscar
- Lucía Caraballo as Julia
- Sergio Abelaira
- Leire Aguiar
- María Esteve as Pilar
- Alberto San Juan as Rafa
- Guillermo Toledo
- Secun de la Rosa as Carlos
- Natalia Verbeke as Paula

== Production ==
The film is the directorial debut feature of Mexican director Samantha López Speranza. It was produced by Telecinco Cinema, Weekend Studio, Impala, Lightbox Animation Studios, and Todos los lados de la cama AIE, with the involvement of Mediaset España and Mediterráneo Mediaset España Group.

== Release ==
The film is set to premiere in the 'Special Screenings' section of the Seville European Film Festival in November 2025. It is scheduled to be released theatrically in Spain by Buena Vista International on 14 November 2025. Filmax purchased international sales rights to the film.

== See also ==
- List of Spanish films of 2025
