= Secun de la Rosa =

Spanish actor

- De la Rosa in 2026
- Born: Secundino de la Rosa Márquez; 23 December 1969 (age 56); Barcelona, SPain
- Occupations: Actor, theatre director, comedian

Secundino "Secun" de la Rosa Márquez (born 23 December 1969) is a Spanish actor and theatre author and director.

== Biography ==
Secundino Benjamín Juan de la Rosa Márquez Ailagas de Carvajal was born in Barcelona on 23 December 1969. he studied drama in Cristina Rota's atelier, and although he owes his popularity to his film and television comedy roles, he has worked as author-director in several stage plays. He has been awarded and nominated for these plays and he has also received the 2003 Premio al mejor actor de la Unión de Actores as an actor.

His filmmaking debut was the musical romcom The Cover, released in 2021.

== Filmography ==
=== Feature film ===
- La pequeña Suiza (2019) as Don Anselmo
- El Bar, by Álex de la Iglesia (2017)
- Pieles, by Eduardo Casanova (2017)
- El tiempo de los monstruos, by Félix Sabroso (2015)
- Negociador (El problema número uno), by Borja Cobeaga (2014)
- Pancho, el perro millonario, by Tom Fernández (2014)
- Hablar, by Joaquín Oristrell (2014)
- Las brujas de Zugarramurdi, by Álex de la Iglesia (2013)
- Del lado del verano, by Antonia San Juan (2012)
- Cinco metros cuadrados, como Nacho. Dir. Max Lemcke (2011)
- Lobos de Arga, by Juan Martínez Moreno (2011)
- Casual day (2007) by Max Lemcke.
- Encerrados en la mina by David Serrano.
- El síndrome de Svensson (2006) by Kepa Sojo.
- Los dos lados de la cama (2005) by Emilio Martínez Lázaro.
- Las aventuras de Pocholo y Borjamari (2004) by Juan Cabestany, Enrique Lavigne.
- El chocolate del loro (2004) by Ernesto Martín.
- Hay motivo (2004) by Joaquín Oristrell.
- Incautos (2004) by Miguel Bardem.
- Los abajo firmantes(2003) by Joaquín Oristrell.
- Días de fútbol (2003) by David Serrano.
- El otro lado de la cama (2002) by Emilio Martínez Lázaro.
- Noche de reyes by Miguel Bardem.
- Peor imposible (2002) by José Semprúm/David Blanco.
- Aunque tú no lo sepas (2000) by J.V. Cordova.
- Me da igual(2000) by David Gordon.
- Vadene via by Max Vianchi, Ana Pamplons

=== Short films ===
- Flotando (2018) by Frankie De Leonardis.
- Desaliñada (2001) by Gustavo Salmerón.
- Postales de la India (2000) by Juanjo Díaz Polo.
- Al rojo vivo by Raúl Muñoz.

=== TV ===
- Los irrepetibles, La Sexta
- Aída, Telecinco
- Paco y Veva, TVE
- 7 vidas, Telecinco
- Cuéntame cómo pasó, TVE
- El grupo, Telecinco
- Policías Telecinco
- Compañeros, Antena 3

Cristo y rey( A3 Premium)

== Theatre ==
- El rincón de la borracha by Secun de la Rosa.
- Los openheart by Andrés Lima.
- Pensar amb els ulls by Joan Brossa.
- Radio para, by Secun de la Rosa.
- Obedecedor by Amparo Valle.
- El homosexual de Copi by Gustavo Tambascio.
- Lorca Cía. Lluis Pascual.
- Susrealismos Cía. Caracalva.
- Te odio by Juanjo Díaz Polo.
- A las tantas by Secun de la Rosa.
- Anoche por poco sueño contigo, Cía. Caracalva
- Bola de sebo Alberto San Juan, Cia.Animalario .
- Oración, Fernando Arrabal Cía. Madera 17.
- Esperando al zurdo, by Cristina Rota.
- Louella Persons by Secun de la Rosa (premiere 2013, La casa de la Portera, Madrid)
