= Cinema Days (2007 film) =

- Theatrical release poster
- Spanish: Días de cine
- Directed by: David Serrano
- Written by: David Serrano; Alberto San Juan
- Produced by: Tomás Cimadevilla
- Starring: Alberto San Juan; Nathalie Poza; Miguel Rellán; Javier Gutiérrez; Andrés Lima; Luis Bermejo; Fernando Tejero; Roberto Álamo; Gerardo Malla; Amparo Valle; Diego Martín; Malena Alterio
- Cinematography: Kiko de la Rica
- Edited by: Nacho Ruiz Capillas
- Music by: Miguel Malla
- Production companies: TeleSpan2000; Estudios Picasso; LaZona Films
- Release date: 9 February 2007
- Country: Spain
- Language: Spanish

Cinema Days (Spanish: Días de cine) is a 2007 Spanish comedy film directed by David Serrano. It stars Alberto San Juan, Nathalie Poza, Miguel Rellán, Javier Gutiérrez, Andrés Lima, Luis Bermejo, and Fernando Tejero.

== Plot ==
Set in 1977 Spain, during the so-called Transition, the plot follows the developments upon the shooting of a social conscience-stirring film by reputed anti-francoist auteur Federico Solá, who is forced by sleazy producer José María Culebras to work with former wunderkind and in-the-dumps folkloric artist Silvia Conde as a leading actress.

== Cast ==
- Alberto San Juan as Federico Solá
- Nathalie Poza as Silvia Conde
- Miguel Rellán as José Mª Culebras
- Javier Gutiérrez as Benito Magallanes
- Andrés Lima as Marcial Pérez
- Luis Bermejo as Manolo Castaño
- Fernando Tejero as Fino
- Roberto Álamo as Alfredo Torres
- Gerardo Malla as Francisco Grandes
- Amparo Valle as Mari
- Diego Martín as Augusto
- Malena Alterio as Gloria

== Production ==
The film was written by David Serrano with the collaboration of Alberto San Juan. It is a TeleSpan2000, Estudios Picasso, and LaZona Films production.

== Release ==
The film was released theatrically in Spain on 9 February 2007. Its theatrical gross amounted to about €600,000.

== Reception ==
Mirito Torreiro of Fotogramas rated the film 2 out of 5 stars, lamenting that "the lack of control over the script leads the film to nonsense", while citing some performances (such as Rellán's) as a positive point.

Jordi Costa of El País deemed the film to be a "comedy of weak humor and erratic tone".

== See also ==
- List of Spanish films of 2007
