= The Amazing World of Borjamari and Pocholo =

- Theatrical release poster
- Spanish: El asombroso mundo de Borjamari y Pocholo
- Directed by: Juan Cavestany; Enrique López Lavigne
- Written by: Juan Cavestany; Enrique López Lavigne
- Produced by: Enrique López Lavigne; Santiago Segura; Álvaro Augustin
- Starring: Santiago Segura; Javier Gutiérrez; Pilar Castro; Carmen de la Maza; Gerardo Malla; Coté Soler; Guillermo Toledo
- Cinematography: Teo Delgado
- Edited by: Iván Aledo
- Music by: Miguel Malla
- Production companies: Amiguetes Entertainment; Apache Films; Estudios Picasso
- Distributed by: Warner Sogefilms
- Release date: 3 December 2004
- Country: Spain
- Language: Spanish
- Box office: €3.4 million

The Amazing World of Borjamari and Pocholo (Spanish: El asombroso mundo de Borjamari y Pocholo) is a 2004 Spanish comedy film directed and written by Juan Cavestany and Enrique López Lavigne, starring Javier Gutiérrez and Santiago Segura.

== Plot ==
The plot follows Borjamari and Pocholo, a couple of (unadapted) posh brothers in their thirties still pending for finishing a licentiate degree in law, mentally stuck in the 1980s' musical scene (specifically obsessed with Mecano), and who refuse to leave the family home. Their once bullied cousin, Pelayo, now a successful person and womanizer, tells them that Mecano is reuniting and playing a gig in the outskirts of Madrid, where they travel together with their female counterpart, Paloma.

== Cast ==
- Javier Gutiérrez as Pocholo
- Santiago Segura as Borjamari
- Pilar Castro as Paloma
- Carmen de la Maza as Concha de Robles
- Gerardo Malla
- Coté Soler
- Guillermo Toledo as Pelayo
- Patricia Vico
- María Ruiz
- Carles Sans
- Andrés Lima
- Javivi

== Production ==
The film was produced by Santiago Segura (on behalf of Amiguetes Entertainment), Enrique López Lavigne (Apache Films) and Álvaro Augustin (Estudios Picasso).

== Release ==
Distributed by Warner Sogefilms, the film was theatrically released in Spain on 3 December 2004. It grossed over €3 million at the domestic box office. (Note: The ICAA records a gross of €3,367,646.69 and 669,610 admissions.)

== Reception ==
Reviewing for Fotogramas, Mirito Torreiro gave the film a negative review, scoring 1 out of 5 stars, highlighting Pilar Castro's performance as the best of the film while negatively assessing pretty much everything else, considering the film to be "one of the comedies with the least capacity to make people laugh of all the comedies that have been made in Spain in recent years".

Jonathan Holland of Variety wrote that the infantilism of the lead characters "is largely duplicated by the script, which tacks cliches and deja vu gags onto a threadbare plotline", considering that "teenage auds will find some ’80s references baffling, and older viewers, who may once have identified with the protags, will be relieved to find they’ve outgrown this sort of thing".

== See also ==
- List of Spanish films of 2004
