= Supernormal (2021 TV series) =

Spanish television series

- Genre: Comedy
- Created by: Olatz Arroyo; Marta Sánchez
- Written by: Olatz Arroyo; Marta Sánchez
- Directed by: Emilio Martínez-Lázaro
- Starring: Miren Ibarguren; Diego Martín; Gracia Olayo; Bárbara Goenaga; Peter Vives; Usun Yoon; Lucía Delgado; Guillermo M. Ortega; Luna Fulgencio; Nico Rossi; Pablo Moro
- Country of origin: Spain
- Original language: Spanish
- No. of seasons: 1
- No. of episodes: 6

Production
- Running time: approx. 25 min
- Production companies: Movistar+; Secuoya Studios

Original release
- Network: Movistar+
- Release: 9 July 2021

Supernormal is a Spanish comedy television series created by Olatz Arroyo and Marta Sánchez and directed by Emilio Martínez-Lázaro, starring Miren Ibarguren in the leading role. It was released on Movistar+ on 9 July 2021.

== Premises ==
The fiction follows Patricia Picón, struggling with her job as investment banking executive and as well as with raising a large family.

== Cast ==
- Miren Ibarguren as Patricia Picón.
- Diego Martín as Alfonso, Patricia's husband.
- Gracia Olayo as Marisol.
- Bárbara Goenaga as Isa, Patricia's sister.
- Peter Vives as Mauro.
- Usun Yoon as Imelda.
- Lucía Delgado
- Guillermo M. Ortega as Juan Carlos.
- Luna Fulgencio as Jimena.
- Nico Rossi as Bosco.
- Pablo Moro as Rico.
- Hugo Alejo as Rodrigo.
- Mauro Muñiz Urquiza as Tito.
- Manu Hernández as Andrés.
- Mariona Terés as Gabi, Isa's girlfriend.

Special collaboration

- Marta Fernández Muro as Rosario, Patricia's mother.
- Joaquín Reyes
- María Esteve
- Martina Klein
- Dafne Fernández
- Llum Barrera
- Dani Piqueras
- Sara Escudero
- Juanjo Pardo

== Production and release ==
Created and written by Olatz Arroyo and Marta Sánchez, Supernormal was directed by Emilio Martínez-Lázaro. It consists of 6 episodes with an approximate running time of around 25 minutes. Filming began on 17 October 2019 in Madrid. Produced by Movistar+ in collaboration with Secuoya Studios, the series is distributed abroad by Beta Film. On 15 June 2021, Miren Ibarguren disclosed the definitive release date, set for 9 July 2021. The renovation of the series for a second season (directed by Vicente Villanueva) was announced in October 2021.

Series	Episodes	Originally released			Ref.
Series	Episodes	First released	Last released	Network	Ref.
1	6	9 July 2021		Movistar+	
2	TBA	TBA	TBA	Movistar+	

No. overall	No. in season	Title	Directed by	Original release date
1	1	"El día de la madre"	Emilio Martínez-Lázaro	9 July 2021
2	2	"La mujer del año"	Emilio Martínez-Lázaro	9 July 2021
3	3	"La muralla china"	Emilio Martínez-Lázaro	9 July 2021
4	4	"Jack Smith"	Emilio Martínez-Lázaro	9 July 2021
5	5	"Sierra Nevada"	Emilio Martínez-Lázaro	9 July 2021
6	6	"Dulce Navidad"	Emilio Martínez-Lázaro	9 July 2021
