= El otro lado de la cama (musical) =

El otro lado de la cama is a Spanish jukebox musical adaptation of the 2002 Spanish movie of the same name. It premiered on September 16, 2004. It was written by David Serrano, with music by Coque Malla.

== Premise ==
The musical follows the skirmishes and love affairs of two couples (Javier and Sonia, and Pedro and Paula) to a soundtrack of the golden age of Spanish pop. Songs used include Tequila's "Salta" and "Dime que me Quiero", Coz's "Girls are warriors", Mastretta's "Honeymoon", and "Mucho mejor" by Los Rodríguez.

== Productions ==
The show premiered on September 16, 2004 in Madrid's Amaya Theater. The production was directed by Josep María Mestres with choreography by Marta Carrasco. The cast included Lucía Jiménez, Raúl Peña, Diana Lázaro, and Coté Soler.

In 2014, the show returned to Madrid at the Quevedo Theater, where it ran from June 19, 2014 until February 27, 2015, when it transferred to the Figaro Theater. Performances began again on March 3, 2015. The production was directed by José Manuel Pardo, with choreography by Antonio Mañas.

In January 2016, the show premiered in Argentina in Mar Del Plata, with cast members Nicolás Vázquez, Gimena Accardi, Benjamín Rojas, Sofía Pachano, Sofía Gonzalez Gil, and Francisco Ruiz Barlett. It continued to run through February 2017.

In 2017, the show premiered in Mexico.

== Cast ==
Role	2014 Production	2017 Mexican production
Sonia	Mónica Aragón	Marimar Vega
Javier	José Manuel Pardo	Alex Sirvent
Pedro	Álex Casademunt	José Ángel Bichir
Paula	Noelia Miras	Ana Layevska
Rafa	Andrés Arenas	Faisy
Pilar	Laura Ramírez	Valeria Vera
Lucía	Mayte Mira	Luz Edith Rojas
Jennifer	Malu Carranza	Luz Edith Rojas
