= La montaña rusa =

- Theatrical release poster
- Directed by: Emilio Martínez-Lázaro
- Screenplay by: Daniela Fejerman; Emilio Martínez-Lázaro
- Produced by: Enrique Cerezo
- Starring: Verónica Sánchez; Ernesto Alterio; Alberto San Juan; Ara Malikian
- Cinematography: Teo Delgado
- Edited by: Iván Aledo
- Music by: Roque Baños
- Production company: Enrique Cerezo PC
- Distributed by: Alta Classics
- Release date: 16 March 2012
- Country: Spain
- Language: Spanish

La montaña rusa (The Roller Coaster) is a 2012 Spanish comedy film directed by Emilio Martínez-Lázaro from a screenplay by Daniela Fejerman and Martínez-Lázaro which stars Verónica Sánchez, Ernesto Alterio, and Alberto San Juan alongside Ara Malikian.

== Plot ==
The plot tracks a love triangle of three longtime friends meeting up again: a clown (Lorenzo), a television host (Luis), and a frigid violinist (Ada).

== Cast ==
- Verónica Sánchez as Ada
- Alberto San Juan as Luis
- Ernesto Alterio as Lorenzo
- Ara Malikian as Matías
- Luis Bermejo as Álex
- Sara Martín as Carmen
- Cristina Zapata as Remedios
- Marisa Zapata as Dolores
- Gabriel Chamé as Abel Merino

== Production ==
The film is an Enrique Cerezo Producciones Cinematográficas production.

== Release ==
Distributed by Alta Classics, the film was released theatrically in Spain on 16 March 2012.

== Reception ==
Jordi Costa of El País determined that "unfortunately, the film ends up being the anachronism that its own poster suggests".

Irene Crespo of Cinemanía rated the film 1½ ouf of 5 stars, wondering "why do they call this [film] comedy".

== See also ==
- List of Spanish films of 2012
