= Football Days =

- Theatrical release poster
- Spanish: Días de fútbol
- Directed by: David Serrano
- Written by: David Serrano
- Produced by: Tomás Cimadevilla
- Starring: Ernesto Alterio; Alberto San Juan; Natalia Verbeke; María Esteve
- Cinematography: Kiko de la Rica
- Edited by: Rori Sáinz de Rozas
- Music by: Miguel Malla
- Production companies: Telespan 2000; Estudios Picasso
- Distributed by: Buena Vista International
- Release date: 19 September 2003
- Running time: 1h 53min
- Country: Spain
- Language: Spanish

Football Days (Spanish: Días de fútbol) is a 2003 Spanish comedy film written and directed by David Serrano which stars Ernesto Alterio, Alberto San Juan, Natalia Verbeke, and María Esteve.

== Cast ==
- Ernesto Alterio as Antonio
- Alberto San Juan as Jorge
- Natalia Verbeke as Violeta
- María Esteve as Carla
- Fernando Tejero as Serafín
- Pere Ponce as Carlos
- Nathalie Poza as Patricia
- Secun de la Rosa as Gonzalo
- Roberto Álamo as Ramón
- Luis Bermejo as Miguel
- Pilar Castro as Bárbara
- Diego París as Juli
- Diego Martín
- Andrés Lima
- Lola Dueñas as Macarena
- Eva Santolaria as Lorena
- Pepo Oliva as Tomás

== Production ==
The film was produced by Telespan 2000 and Estudios Picasso.

== Release ==
Distributed by Buena Vista International, the film was theatrically released in Spain on 16 September 2003.

== Accolades ==
| Year | Award | Category | Nominee(s) | Result | Ref. |
|---|---|---|---|---|---|
| 2004 | 18th Goya Awards | Best New Director | David Serrano | Nominated | |
| 2004 | 18th Goya Awards | Best Actor | Ernesto Alterio | Nominated | |
| 2004 | 18th Goya Awards | Best New Actor | Fernando Tejero | Won | |
| 2004 | 18th Goya Awards | Best New Actress | Nathalie Poza | Nominated | |
| 2004 | 18th Goya Awards | Best Editing | Rori Sáinz de Rozas | Nominated | |
| 2004 | 13th Actors and Actresses Union Awards | Best Film Actor in a Leading Role | Ernesto Alterio | Nominated | |
| 2004 | 13th Actors and Actresses Union Awards | Best Film Actor in a Secondary Role | Fernando Tejero | Nominated | |
| 2004 | 13th Actors and Actresses Union Awards | Best Film Actor in a Minor Role | Secun de la Rosa | Won | |
| 2004 | 13th Actors and Actresses Union Awards | Best Film Actress in a Minor Role | Nathalie Poza | Nominated | |
| 2004 | 13th Actors and Actresses Union Awards | Best New Actress | Nathalie Poza | Won | |
| 2004 | 13th Actors and Actresses Union Awards | Best New Actor | Fernando Tejero | Nominated | |

== See also ==
- List of Spanish films of 2003
