= Sidetracked (2015 film) =

- Theatrical release poster
- Spanish: Las ovejas no pierden el tren
- Directed by: Álvaro Fernández Armero
- Written by: Álvaro Fernández Armero
- Produced by: Juan Gordon
- Starring: Raúl Arévalo; Inma Cuesta; Alberto San Juan; Candela Peña; Jorge Bosch; Irene Escolar; Kiti Mánver
- Cinematography: David Azcano
- Edited by: Paco Díaz
- Production companies: Morena Films; All My Friends & Family AIE
- Distributed by: eOne Films Spain
- Release date: 30 January 2015
- Country: Spain
- Language: Spanish

Sidetracked (Spanish: Las ovejas no pierden el tren; transl. 'Sheep Do Not Miss the Train') is a 2015 comedy film written and directed by Álvaro Fernández Armero, which stars Inma Cuesta and Raúl Arévalo alongside Alberto San Juan, Candela Peña, Jorge Bosch, Irene Escolar and Kiti Mánver.

== Plot ==
The plot follows a couple (Luisa and Alberto) at a low ebb, both in personal and professional terms, who decide to move to the countryside.

== Cast ==
- Inma Cuesta as Luisa
- Raúl Arévalo as Alberto
- Alberto San Juan as Juan
- Irene Escolar as Natalia
- Candela Peña as Sara
- Jorge Bosch as Paco
- Kiti Mánver
- Miguel Rellán
- Petra Martínez
- Pilar Castro

== Production ==
The film was produced by Morena Films (Juan Gordon) and All My Friends & Family AIE, with the participation of TVE, Canal+ and the Cabildo of Gran Canaria. It was shot in 2014. Shooting locations included Madrid, Valdeprados and Gran Canaria.

== Release ==
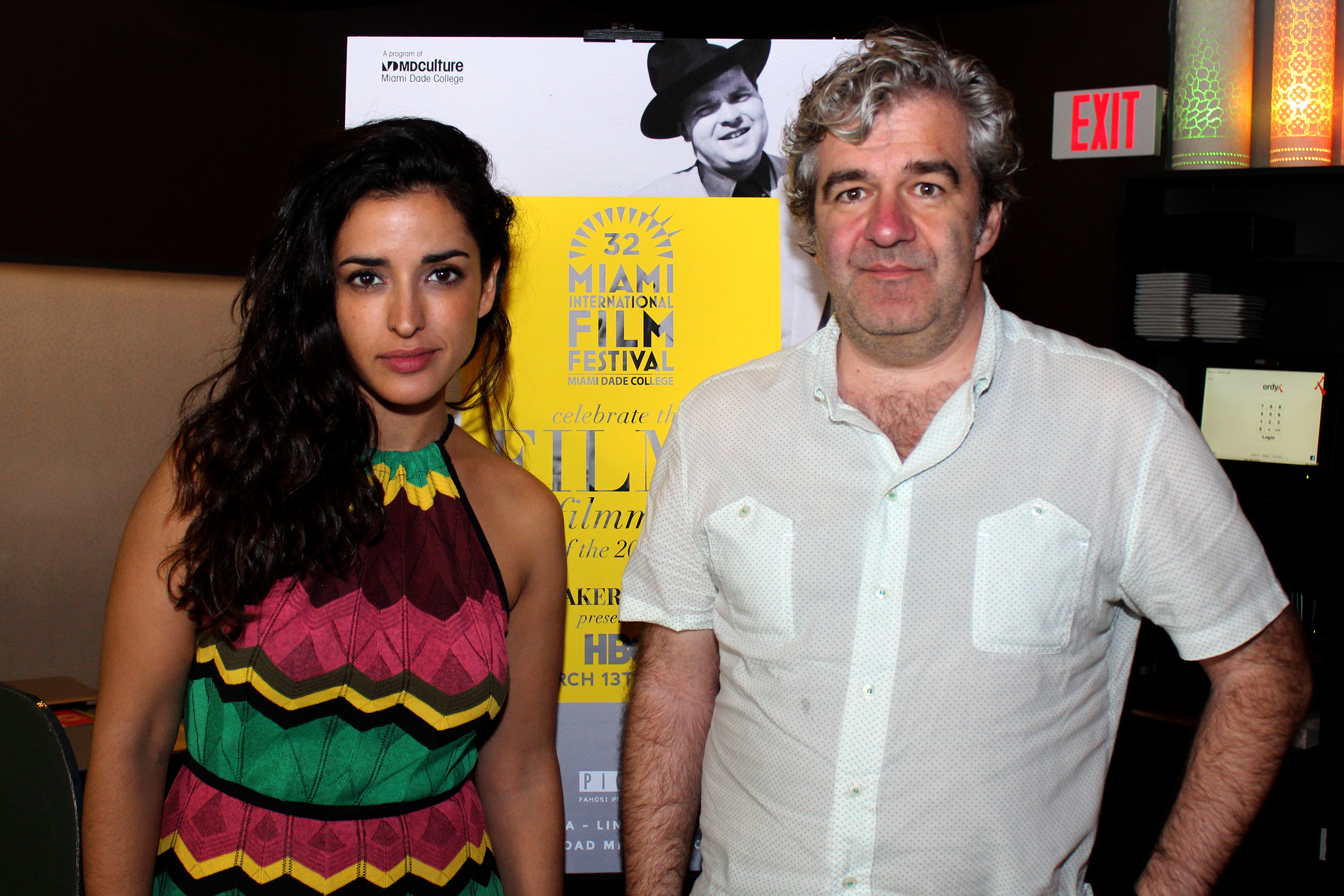
Inma Cuesta and Álvaro Fernández Armero, during the presentation of the film at the 32nd Miami International Film Festival in March 2015.

Distributed by eOne Films Spain, Sidetracked was theatrically released in Spain on 30 January 2015. The film was also selected to be the closing film of the 32nd Miami International Film Festival in March 2015.

== Reception ==
Pere Vall of Fotogramas rated the film 3 out of 5 stars, extolling the performance delivered by Candela Peña as the best thing about the film.

Javier Cortijo of Cinemanía scored 2½ out of 5 stars, summing up the film to be an "irregular rural and nineties apology from an expert in the latter", Fernández Armero, a staple of the (dated) 1990s Spanish romantic-urbanite dramedy genre.

== See also ==
- List of Spanish films of 2015
