= Javivi =

Javier Gil Valle, also known as Javivi, (born June 20, 1961 in Hervás, Province of Cáceres), is a Spanish actor.

When he was a child, he lived in France and he went later to Madrid, where he studied secondary education and sociology. He worked as a social worker in Madrid Council and he later went back to Paris where he received a Ph.D. degree in Sorbonne. In 1994, he went back to Spain, and he started a career as an actor with Inocente, Inocente. His name Javivi is because of his stuttering.

== Filmography ==
- Abracadabra (2017)
- Altamira (2016)
- Asterix and Obelix: God Save Britannia (2012)
- The Monk (2011)
- Locos por el sexo (2006)
- Ninette (2005)
- Tiovivo c. 1950 (2004)
- Diario de una becaria (2003)
- Haz conmigo lo que quieras (2003)
- El robo más grande jamás contado (2002)
- Noche de reyes (2001)
- Operación gónada (2000)
- La mujer más fea del mundo (1999)
- Los lobos de Washington (1999)
- Se buscan fulmontis (1999)
- Mátame mucho (1998)
- El grito en el cielo (1998)
- Pápa Piquillo (1998)
- Brácula. Condemor II (1997)
- Igual caen dos (El atardecer del Pezuñas) (1997)
- Los porretas (1996)
