= Common Dead (film) =

- Theatrical release poster
- Spanish: Muertos comunes
- Directed by: Norberto Ramos del Val
- Screenplay by: Javier Félix Echániz
- Produced by: Javier Ibarretxe; Eduardo Carneros; Esteban Ibarretxe
- Starring: Javier Albalá; Ernesto Alterio; Luchy López; Adolfo Fernández; Ion Inciarte; Fernando Delgado
- Cinematography: Javier Bilbao
- Edited by: Carlos Rodrigo Lascano
- Music by: Santi Ibarretxe
- Production companies: Karbo Vantas Entertainment; Castelao Producciones; Elemental Films
- Distributed by: Filmax
- Release dates: March 2004 (Málaga); 28 May 2004 (Spain)
- Running time: 103 minutes
- Country: Spain
- Language: Spanish

Common Dead (Spanish: Muertos comunes) is a 2004 Spanish police thriller film directed by Norberto Ramos del Val (in his directorial debut) and written by Javier Félix Echániz. It stars Javier Albalá and Ernesto Alterio.

== Plot ==
In 1973 Pamplona, cops Eusebio Luquin and Fermín Goyoaga investigate the brutal rape and murder of a young cleaning woman in the military barracks.

== Cast ==
- Javier Albalá as Eusebio Luquin
- Ernesto Alterio as Fermín Goyoaga
- Adolfo Fernández as comandante Toledo
- Luchy López as Elvira
- Juan Carlos Martín as capitán Gayubas
- Fernando Delgado as comisario
- Sonia Almarcha as Charo
- Ion Inciarte as Marcelo
- Pilar Castro as Juani
- Andrés Gertrúdix as sargento Errea

== Production ==
The film is a Karbo Vantas Entertainment, Castelao Prods, and Elemental Films production, and it had the association of Canal+, and EiTB. Shooting locations included Navarre and Guadalajara.

== Release ==
Common Dead screened at the Málaga Film Festival. Distributed by Filmax, the film was released theatrically in Spain on 28 May 2004.

== Reception ==
Jonathan Holland of Variety considered the film to be "an above-average thriller which becomes a below-average thriller in its final half-hour", otherwise boasting a "gritty charm and sense of purpose often lacking in Spanish thrillers".

A. B. of El Mundo gave the film a 2-star rating, writing that while "sparking interest in its first part", it eventually "succumbs to the weakness of a script that resorts to clichés".

== See also ==
- List of Spanish films of 2004
