= Blinkers (film) =

2007 Spanish films

- Theatrical release poster
- Directed by: Álvaro Fernández Armero
- Written by: Juan Cavestany; Álvaro Fernández Armero
- Produced by: Pedro Uriol; Álvaro Augustin
- Starring: Guillermo Toledo; Javier Gutiérrez; Antonio de la Torre; Nathalie Poza; Lidia Navarro
- Cinematography: David Carretero
- Edited by: David Pinillos
- Music by: Federico Jusid
- Production companies: Columbia Films Producciones Españolas; Morena Films; Telecinco Cinema
- Distributed by: Sony Pictures Releasing International
- Release date: 21 September 2007
- Running time: 95 minutes
- Country: Spain
- Language: Spanish
- Box office: $2 million

Blinkers (Spanish: Salir pitando) is a 2007 Spanish film directed by Álvaro Fernández Armero, starring Guillermo Toledo and Javier Gutiérrez.

== Cast ==
- Guillermo Toledo as José Luis Ratón Pérez
- Javier Gutiérrez as Rafa
- Antonio de la Torre as Juanfran
- Nathalie Poza as Yolanda
- Lidia Navarro as Eva

== Reception ==
Javier Ocaña of El País assessed that, rooted in a stale brand of costumbrismo, "the comedy is only bearable thanks to the work of three excellent comedians" (Toledo, Gutiérrez, and De la Torre).

== See also ==
- List of Spanish films of 2007
