= Guillermo Toledo =

Spanish actor and producer (born 1970)

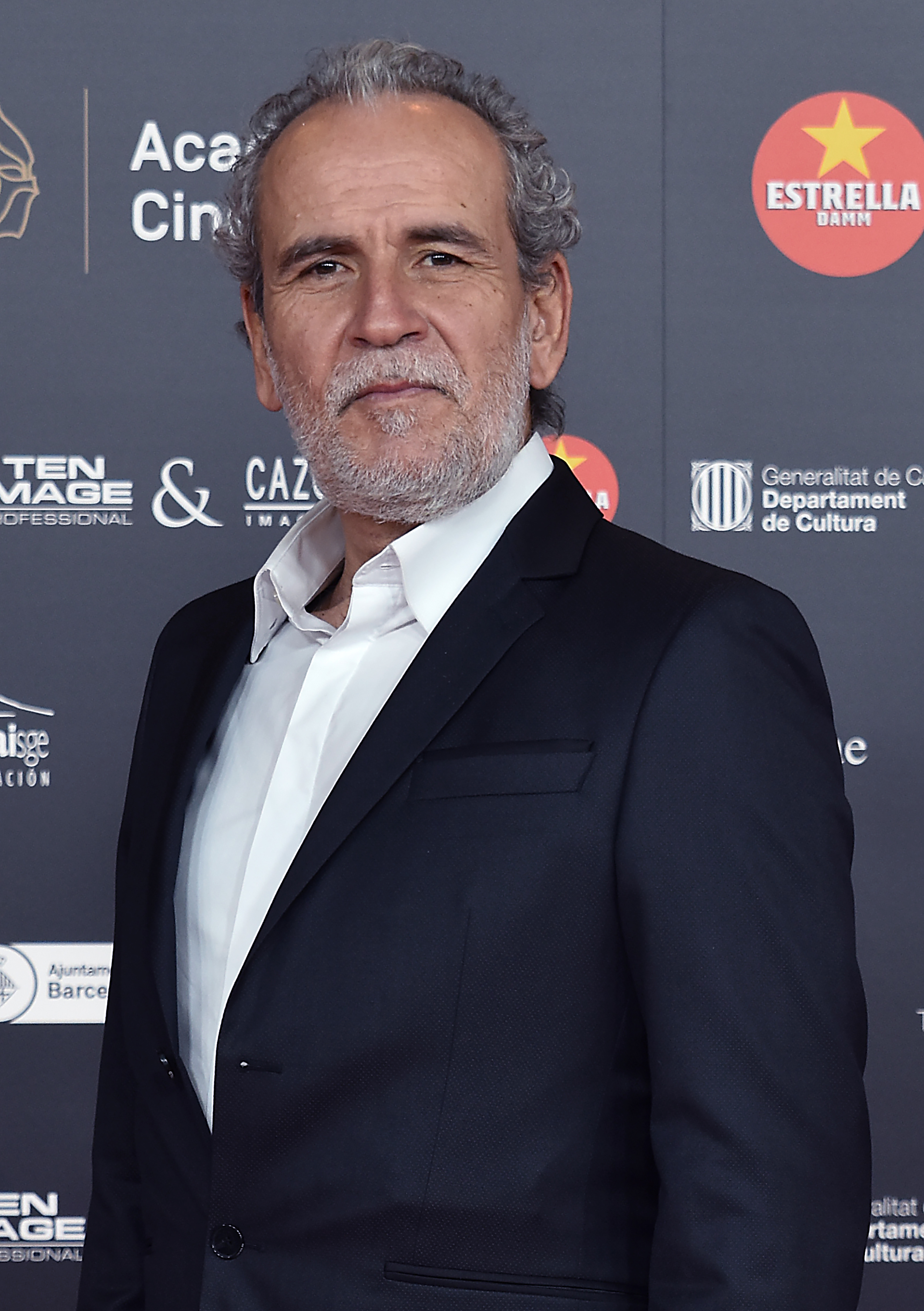
- Toledo at the 2021 Gaudí Awards
- Born: Guillermo Toledo Monsalve; 22 May 1970 (age 56); Madrid, Spain
- Other name: Willy Toledo
- Education: Colegio Estilo
- Years active: 1995–present

Guillermo Toledo Monsalve (born 22 May 1970), also known as Willy Toledo, is a Spanish actor and theatre producer. He gained popularity in Spain for his television role as Richard in sitcom 7 vidas from 1999 to 2002, advancing further public recognition for performances in films such as The Other Side of the Bed (2002), Football Days (2003), and Ferpect Crime (2004).

Besides his acting career, he is also noted as a polemicist and for his political activism. He has claimed to suffer a veto by the Spanish film and television industry limiting his job opportunities due to his off-screen activities.

== Biography ==
Guillermo Toledo Monsalve was born in Madrid on 22 May 1970, to a well-off family, son of a prestigious surgeon pioneer in thoracic surgery. He studied at the Colegio Estilo in El Viso. He trained as an actor in Spain and the United States.

He made his feature film debut in You Shall Die in Chafarinas. Together with Alberto San Juan, Nathalie Poza and Ernesto Alterio, Toledo founded in 1996 the theatrical group Ración de oreja, which presented the theatrical staging Animalario. Ración de oreja later merged with Andrés Lima's Riesgo to create the theatre company Animalario, named after Ración de oreja's debut work.

His breakout role came in 1999 with his performance as 'Richard' in the television series 7 Vidas from 1999 to 2002.

His performance in the 2002 musical film El otro lado de la cama earned him a nomination to the Goya Award for Best New Actor, whereas his performance in Álex de la Iglesia's Crimen ferpecto (2004) earned him a nomination to the Goya Award for Best Actor.

After years of an alleged "veto" of the Spanish film and TV industry on granting roles to Toledo, Toledo returned to fiction in the Netflix's series The Minions of Midas, premiered in November 2019.

== Activism ==
He was noted for his activism in Spain against the Iraq War and for his support to the Sahrawi liberation movement. Distinguished as deliverer of controversial statements and for the "disrespectful" way of defending them, he has also voiced himself in favour of the Cuban regime, against the Spanish monarchy, against Podemos and against La Sexta.

Toledo was arrested for allegedly causing "damage" during the 29 March 2012 Spanish general strike. He was released and the case against him was closed.

In November 2020, he was acquitted after being tried for blasphemy by the Catholic far-right lobby Abogados Cristianos, after writing a Facebook post "shitting on god and the virgin" as way of criticising the opening of oral proceedings against three women who in 2014 paraded a large vagina in Seville under the banner "The Unsubmissive Pussy".

He appeared in the last position of the list of the CUP-led electoral list Guanyem for the 2023 local elections in Badalona. It is a show of symbolic support, it would be improbable that he became a councilor.

In 2026, he co-signed alongside other Spanish artists a text urging the United Nations and the governments of the world to actively work towards the release from prison of Palestinian leader Marwan Barghouti.

== Filmography ==
=== Film ===
Year	Film	Role	Notes	Ref.
1995	Morirás en Chafarinas		Film debut	
1995	La Ley de la frontera			
1998	Mensaka	Ricardo		
1999	Se buscan fulmontis	El Réfor		
1999	La mujer más fea del mundo (The Ugliest Woman in the World)	Lafuente		
1999	La lengua de las mariposas (Butterfly's Tongue)	O'Lis		
2000	El otro barrio (The Other Side)	Vicente		
2000	La espalda de Dios	El sapo		
2001	Amor, curiosidad, prozak y dudas			
2001	Juana la Loca (Mad Love)	Capitán Corrales		
2001	The Old Man Who Read Love Stories	Onecen		
2001	Intacto	Horacio		
2002	El otro lado de la cama (The Other Side of the Bed)	Pedro		
2003	Al sur de Granada (South from Granada)	Paco		
2003	El misterio Galíndez	Ricardo		
2004	Las voces de la noche (Voices in the Night)			
2004	El asombroso mundo de Borjamari y Pocholo	Pelayo		
2004	Seres queridos	Rafi		
2004	Crimen ferpecto (The Ferpect Crime)	Rafael González		
2006	Los 2 lados de la cama	Pedro		
2007	Blinkers	José Luis Ratón Pérez		
2008	Santos	El antropomosco		
2008	La buena nueva (The Good News)	Antonino		
2009	After	Julio		
2010	Desechos			
2012	Los amantes pasajeros (I'm So Excited!)	Ricardo Galán		
2013	Diamantes negros			
2014	Historias de Lavapiés	Ernesto		
2018	Black Is Beltza	Teniente Muñoz	Voice work	
2026	Viva (Alive)			

=== Television ===
Year	Film	Role	Notes	Ref.
2020	Los favoritos de Midas (The Minions of Midas)	Inspector Conte		
2023	Todas las veces que nos enamoramos (In Love All Over Again)	Pablo		
2023	El grito de las mariposas (The Cry of the Butterflies)	Asier Oyamburu		
2023	Romancero	Teodoro		
