= The Witch Affair =

- Theatrical release poster
- Cosa de brujas
- Directed by: José Miguel Juárez
- Written by: Amalio Cuevas; Agustín Póveda
- Starring: José Sancho; Manuela Arcuri; Antonio Hortelano; Alberto San Juan; Manuel Manquiña
- Music by: Mario de Benito
- Distributed by: Buena Vista International
- Release date: 17 January 2003
- Running time: 102 minutes
- Country: Spain
- Language: Spanish

The Witch Affair (Cosa de brujas) is a 2003 Spanish film written by Amalio Cuevas and Agustín Póveda, and directed by José Miguel Juárez.

== Plot summary ==
The night of San Juan, Miguel murders his associate. Two elderly people are witness to the crime and predict that all his dreams will come true thereafter. He will know the price he has to pay when he sees a black cat with a moon shaped mark on its forehead. Twenty-two years later a messenger begins to witness all his dreams come true...

== Cast ==
- José Sancho - Miguel Gironza
- Manuela Arcuri - Maria
- Antonio Hortelano - Serafin
- Alberto San Juan - Ángel
- Manuel Manquiña - Rafael

== Trivia ==
- The film's composer, Mario de Benito, was nominated for a 2004 Goya for Best Original Song.
- Filming dates: 20 March 2002 - 28 May 2002
- Opening Weekend Gross: €272,606 (Spain) (19 January 2003) (180 Screens)
- Second Weekend Gross: €122,127 (Spain) (26 January 2003)

== See also ==
- List of Spanish films of 2003
