= More the Merrier =

2021 film by Paco Caballero

- Theatrical release poster
- Spanish: Donde caben dos
- Directed by: Paco Caballero
- Written by: Paco Caballero; Eric Navarro; Eduard Sola; Daniel González
- Produced by: Carlos Fernández; Laura Fernández Brites
- Starring: Ernesto Alterio; Raúl Arévalo; Luis Callejo; Anna Castillo; Pilar Castro; Álvaro Cervantes; Carlos Cuevas; Verónica Echegui; Miki Esparbé; Ricardo Gómez; María León; Melina Matthews; Ana Milán; María Morales; Jorge Suquet; Aixa Villagrán
- Cinematography: David Valldepérez
- Edited by: Liana Artigal
- Production companies: Castelao Productions; Castelao Pictures; Donde caben dos AIE
- Distributed by: Filmax
- Release date: 30 July 2021
- Country: Spain
- Language: Spanish

More the Merrier (Spanish: Donde caben dos, lit. 'Where Two Fit') is a 2021 Spanish sex comedy film co-written and directed by Paco Caballero. It features an ensemble cast that includes Ernesto Alterio, Raúl Arévalo, Luis Callejo, Anna Castillo, Pilar Castro, Álvaro Cervantes, Carlos Cuevas, Verónica Echegui, Miki Esparbé, Ricardo Gómez, María León, Melina Matthews, Ana Milán, María Morales, Jorge Suquet and Aixa Villagrán.

== Synopsis ==
The plot concerns about several substories, most of them taking place around swinging club Paradiso, involving the likes of Alba and Liana; Pablo, Clara and Victoria; Raúl and Víctor; or Jaime, Belén, Ana, and Miguel.

== Cast ==
- Ernesto Alterio as Alberto
- Raúl Arévalo as Jaime
- Luis Callejo as Paco
- Anna Castillo as Clara
- Pilar Castro as Claudia
- Álvaro Cervantes as Raúl
- Carlos Cuevas as Iván
- Verónica Echegui as Ana
- Miki Esparbé as Pablo
- Ricardo Gómez as Víctor
- María León as Alba
- Melina Matthews as Belén
- Ana Milán as anfitriona
- María Morales as Marta
- Jorge Suquet as Miguel
- Aixa Villagrán as Liana
- Melani Olivares as Silvia
- Adrià Collado as Sergio
- Ángela Cervantes as Victoria

== Production ==
The film is a Castelao Productions, Castelao Pictures, and Donde caben dos AIE production. It was shot in Barcelona.

== Release ==
The film was released theatrically in Spain on 30 July 2021 by Filmax. After three weeks, it had grossed €202,154 (33,215 admissions).

== Reception ==
Jade Budowski of Decider.com gave the film a negative recommendation, considering that it "doesn't quite know what kind of movie it wants to be and fails to come together in the end", sex-positive message and performances from the cast notwithstanding.

Juan Pando of Fotogramas rated the film 3 out of 5 stars, assessing that "it works as a racy comedy, but it does not quite work as the groundbreaking proposal it promises to be", featuring an excessive reliance on dialogue and the voice-over.

Eulàlia Iglesias of El Confidencial rated the film 3 out of 5 stars, warning that "as in any choral comedy, some subplots work better than others", with an TV-sitcom-like [over]abundance of dialogue, while still considering the film to be a "fun invitation to a joint and unprejudiced erotic spree".

== See also ==
- List of Spanish films of 2021
