= We Need to Talk (film) =

- Theatrical release poster
- Spanish: Tenemos que hablar
- Directed by: David Serrano
- Screenplay by: Diego San José; David Serrano
- Produced by: José Antonio Félez; Mikel Lejarza; Mercedes Gamero
- Starring: Hugo Silva; Michelle Jenner; Verónica Forqué; Óscar Ladoire; Ernesto Sevilla; Belén Cuesta
- Cinematography: Juan Carlos Gómez
- Edited by: Alberto de Toro
- Music by: Julio de la Rosa
- Production companies: Atípica Films; Atresmedia Cine
- Distributed by: Warner Bros. Pictures España
- Release date: 26 February 2016
- Country: Spain
- Language: Spanish

We Need to Talk (Spanish: Tenemos que hablar) is a 2016 Spanish romantic comedy film directed by David Serrano from a screenplay by Serrano and Diego San José which stars Michelle Jenner and Hugo Silva alongside Verónica Forqué, Óscar Ladoire, Ernesto Sevilla, and Belén Cuesta.

== Plot ==
The story is set against the backdrop of the Spanish economic crisis and the Preferentes Scandal. Nuria is planning to marry her current partner but she needs the divorce papers from her former partner, Jorge, a total mess of a person. A remarriage screwball comedy ensues.

== Cast ==
- Michelle Jenner as Nuria
- Verónica Forqué as Patricia
- Óscar Ladoire as Miguel
- Hugo Silva as Jorge
- Belén Cuesta as Yoli
- Ernesto Sevilla as Lucas

== Production ==
The film was produced by Atípica Films and Atresmedia Cine, and it had the participation of Atresmedia and Movistar+. Filming began in Madrid in June 2015.

== Release ==
Distributed by Warner Bros. Pictures España, the film was released theatrically in Spain on 26 February 2016.

== Reception ==
Javier Ocaña of El País assessed that even if "the possibilities of a good comedy associated with its time can be perceived", "a film needs a plus and this one does not have it", for narrative reasons, for the mise-en-scene, and for technical issues.

Jordi Batlle Caminal of La Vanguardia wrote that "everything is predictable but, miraculously, everything, or almost everything, works with astonishing efficiency", with the film having "the rhythm, the dialogue and retorts of a good comedy.

== See also ==
- List of Spanish films of 2016
