= Alberto San Juan =

Spanish film, television, and theater actor

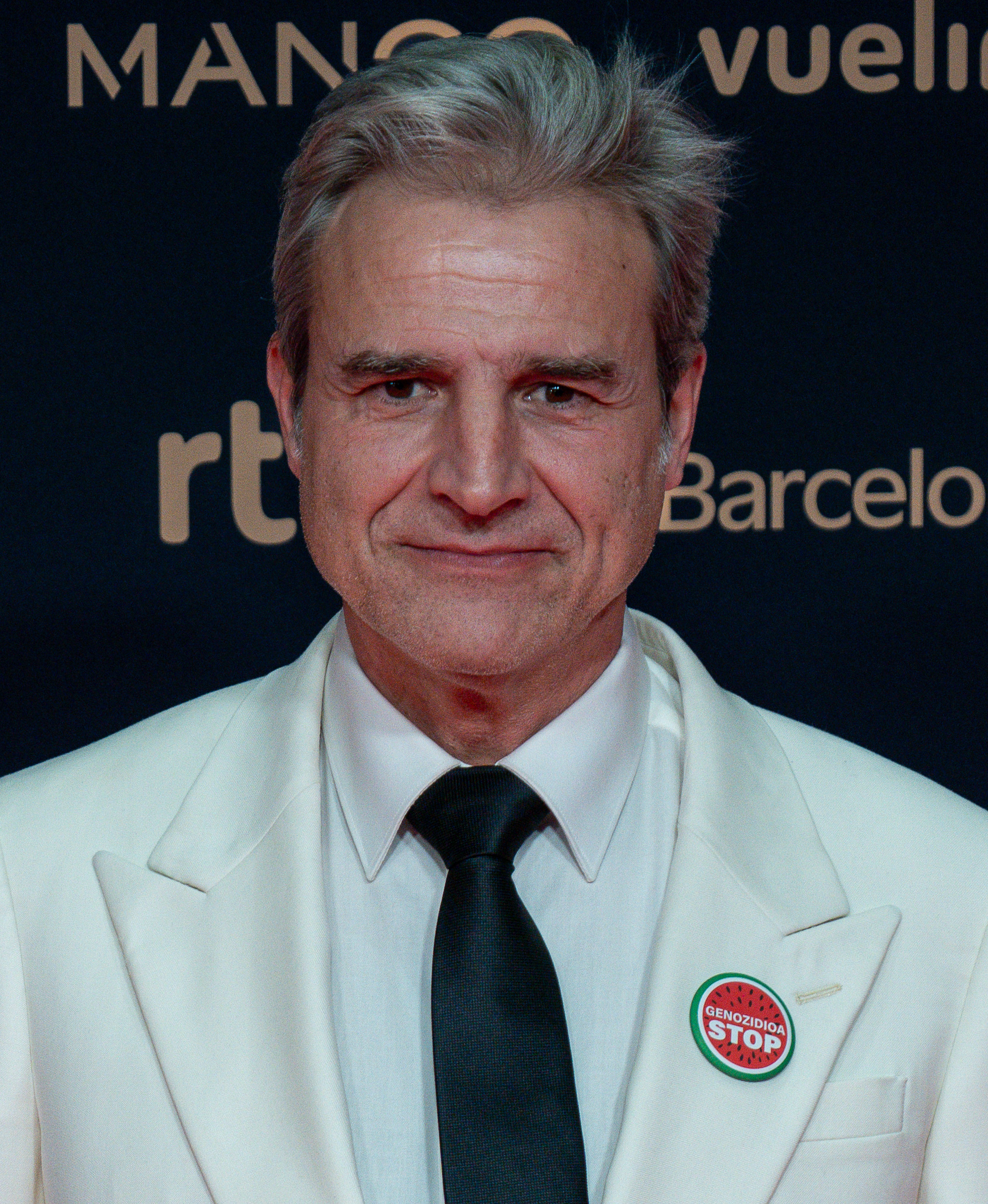
- San Juan in 2026
- Born: Alberto San Juan Guijarro; 1 November 1968 (age 58); Madrid, Spain
- Occupations: Actor; theatre director; playwright
- Years active: 1990s–present

Alberto San Juan Guijarro (born 1 November 1968) is a Spanish film, stage and television actor. He garnered visibility as a comedy actor in Airbag (1997), becoming a household name in Spain for his roles in the comedy films The Other Side of the Bed (2002), Football Days (2003), and The Two Sides of the Bed (2005). He also starred in Under the Stars (2007), The People Upstairs (2020), Four's a Crowd (2022), A House on Fire (2024), and The Dinner (2025). He is the recipient of multiple accolades, including two Goya awards.

He has also worked as a stage director and playwright, and served as the first artistic director of the Teatro del Barrio in Lavapiés.

== Early life and education ==
Alberto San Juan was born on 1 November 1968 in Madrid, the son of cartoonist Máximo San Juan and radio announcer Pilar Guijarro Ortiz de Zárate. He was raised in the well-off neighborhood of El Viso. He attended the Colegio Estilo and joined its theatrical group, where he acquainted with his long-term friend Guillermo Toledo. He also spent many of his childhood's summers in Cañamares, province of Cuenca. He studied journalism and worked for two years at Diario 16 before pursuing an acting career. While studying journalism, he acquainted with Antonio de la Torre. At age 24, he joined the Cristina Rota's atelier to train his acting chops.

== Career ==
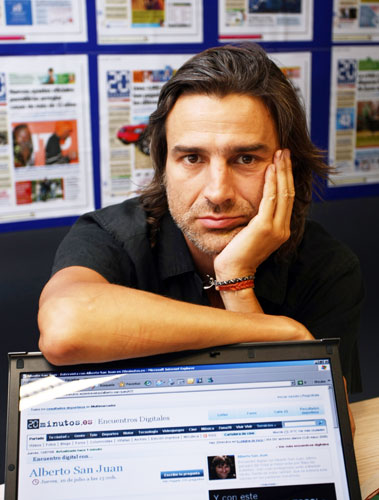
San Juan in the 2000s

San Juan landed his big screen debut with a bit part in You Shall Die in Chafarinas (1995). Jointly with Guillermo Toledo, Nathalie Poza and Ernesto Alterio, San Juan founded the theatre group 'Ración de oreja', which merged with Andrés Lima's 'Riesgo' into the theatre company Animalario, upon the premiere of San Juan's debut as a playwright, Animalario. Bonitas historias de entretenimiento sobre la humillación cotidiana de existir. His first film success and main film role was Juanma Bajo Ulloa's Airbag (1997). For his character of Paco, a scoundrel, actors Javier Bardem and Viggo Mortensen were previously considered. In the late 1990s, together with his friends Ernesto Alterio and Guillermo Toledo, he went on to land film credits in Sleepless in Madrid, Washington Wolves, and The Ugliest Woman in the World.

He gained popularity for his supporting role in the musical comedy film The Other Side of the Bed (2002), which also landed him a Goya Award nomination.

For his role as an unsuccessful jazz musician returning to his hometown in Under the Stars (2007), he won the Goya Award for Best Leading Actor.

He was a main promoter of the Teatro del Barrio, a project of political theatre launched in the former premises of the Sala Triángulo in Lavapiés on 4 December 2013, serving as its first artistic director.

He starred alongside Mario Casas as a Conservative and homosexual monarchist maître d'hôtel in the aftermath of the Spanish Civil War in the comedy film The Dinner (2025), clinching another nomination for the Goya Award for Best Leading Actor.

He starred as a repentant Catholic priest accused of sexual abuse in The Light (2026).

== Views ==
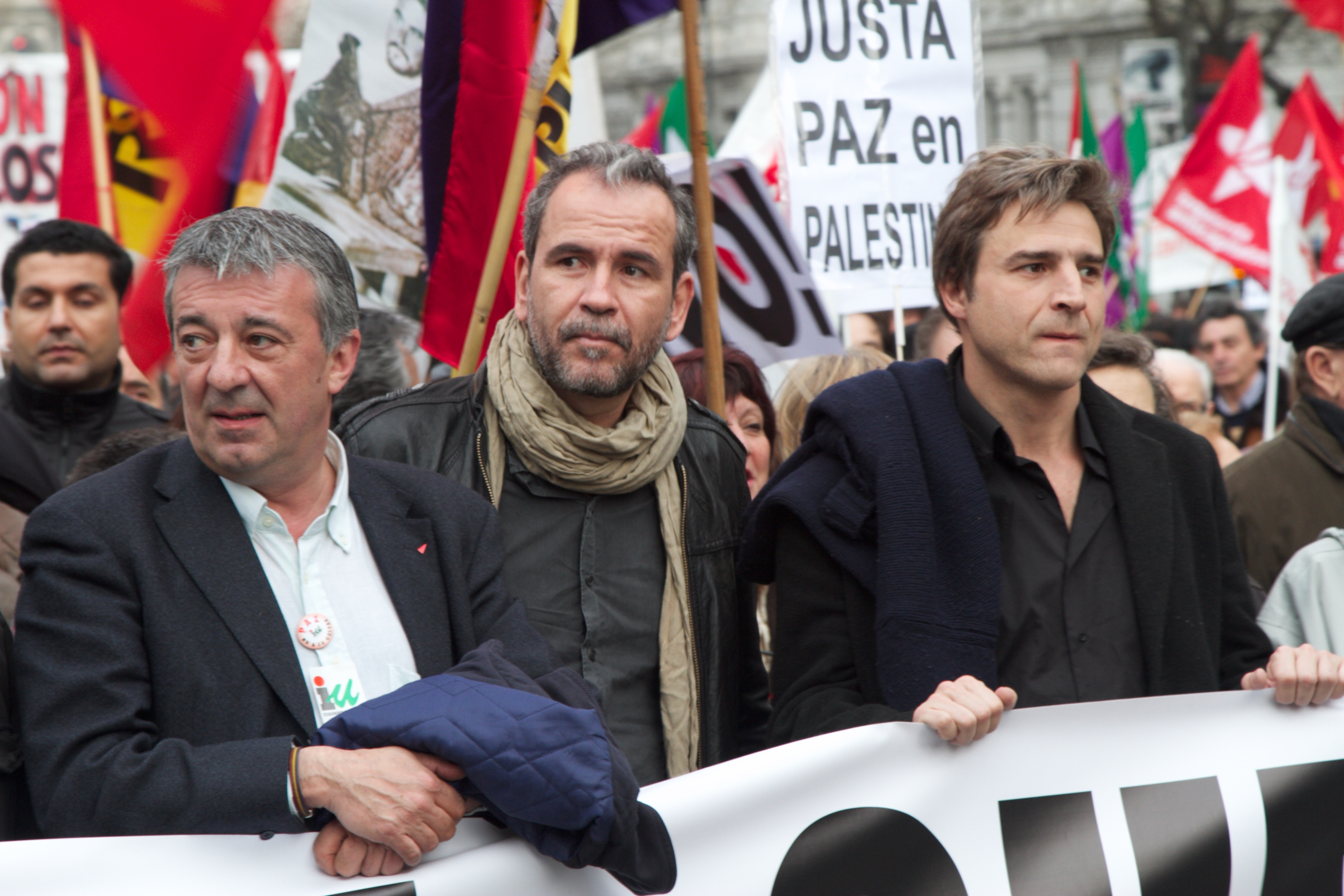
San Juan protesting against the 2011 military intervention in Libya with Gregorio Gordo and his friend Guillermo Toledo

Alberto San Juan is known for his left-wing views. He publicly lent support to the United Left ahead of the 2011 Spanish general election. He also endorsed the manifesto that led to the creation of Podemos, presented at the Teatro del Barrio in January 2014. In February 2015, he became a member of the citizens' council of Podemos in Madrid. He later distanced himself from the party, lamenting its breakup due to an "authoritarian concept of internal organisation".

In 2025, San Juan co-signed the manifesto promoted by FiSahara decrying the filming of The Odyssey in Moroccan-occupied Western Sahara.

In 2026, he co-signed alongside other Spanish artists a text urging the United Nations and the governments of the world to actively work towards the release from prison of Palestinian leader Marwan Barghouti. Also in 2026, he co-signed a manifesto in defence of philanthropist and human rights activist Fergie Chambers, demanding the Spanish State to prevent his extradition to the United States "and grant Fergie international protection through the recognition of his right to political asylum".

== Filmography ==
Key
†	Denotes films that have not yet been released

=== Film ===
Year	Title	Role	Notes	Ref.
1995	Morirás en Chafarinas (You Shall Die in Chafarinas)			
1997	Airbag	Pako		
1998	Insomnio (Sleepless in Madrid)			
1999	Entre las piernas (Between Your Legs)			
1999	La ciudad de los prodigios (The City of Marvels)			
1999	Zapping	Alberto		
1999	La sombra de Caín	Santana		
1999	Los lobos de Washington (Washington Wolves)	Antonio		
1999	La mujer más fea del mundo (The Ugliest Woman in the World)	Luis Casanova		
1999	Sobreviviré (I Will Survive)			
2000	Km. 0	Sergio		
2000	San Bernardo (Saint Bernard)	Miguel		
2002	No dejaré que no me quieras (I Won't Let You Not Love Me)	Enrique		
2002	El otro lado de la cama (The Other Side of the Bed)	Rafa		
2003	Cosa de brujas (The Witch Affair)	Ángel		
2003	Días de fútbol (Football Days)	Jorge		
2003	Haz conmigo lo que quieras (Kill Me Tender)	Manolo		
2004	Agujeros en el cielo			
2004	Horas de luz (Hours of Light)	Juan José Garfia		
2005	Los 2 lados de la cama (The 2 Sides of the Bed)	Rafa	Reprise of role in The Other Side of the Bed	
2007	Días de cine (Cinema Days)	Federico Solá	Also collaborating writer	
2007	Bajo las estrellas (Under the Stars)	Benito Lacunza		
2007	Casual Day	Psicólogo ('psychologist')		
2009	La vergüenza (The Shame)	Pepe		
2009	La isla interior (The Island Inside)	Martín		
2011	Mientras duermes (Sleep Tight)	Marcos		
2012	La montaña rusa	Luis		
2012	Una pistola en cada mano (A Gun in Each Hand)	A.		
2014	La ignorancia de la sangre (The Ignorance of Blood)	Yacub		
2015	Las ovejas no pierden el tren (Sidetracked)	Juan		
2015	Barcelona, nit d'hivern (Barcelona Christmas Night)	Miguel		
2016	Las furias (The Furies)	Aki		
2018	El rey	Franco	Also co-director; based on his own play	
2020	Sentimental (The People Upstairs)	Salva		
2022	El cuarto pasajero (Four's a Crowd)	Julián		
2023	Matusalén (Mathusalem)	Kase.O		
2024	Casa en flames (A House on Fire)	Carlos		
2025	Parenostre (Our Father, Our President)	Juan Carlos I		
2025	La cena (The Dinner)	Genaro		
2025	Todos los lados de la cama (Every Side of the Bed)	Rafa		
2026	La luz (The Light)	Manuel Monsalve		
2026	El director (The Editor)	Cardenal		
TBA	Libre †	Nino Bravo		
TBA	Hestia †	Paco		

=== Television ===
Year	Title	Role	Notes	Ref.
1997	Más que amigos	Víctor		
2010	Águila Roja (Red Eagle)	Víctor		
2011	Cheers	Nicolás Arnedo		
2013	Gran Reserva: El origen	Jesús Reverte		
2015	Carlos, rey emperador	Carlos de Borbón		
2021	Cardo	Santiago		
2023–24	Todos mienten (You Shall Not Lie)	Beto	Season 2	
2024	Cristobal Balenciaga	Cristóbal Balenciaga		
2025	Furia (Rage)	Roberto		
TBD	Un perfecto extraño †			

== Accolades ==
Year	Award	Category	Work	Result	Ref.
2003	17th Goya Awards	Best Supporting Actor	The Other Side of the Bed	Nominated	
2008	22nd Goya Awards	Best Actor	Under the Stars	Won	
2008	11th Max Awards	Best Actor	Marat-Sade	Nominated	
2008	17th Actors and Actresses Union Awards	Best Film Actor in a Leading Role	Under the Stars	Nominated	
2009	12th Max Awards	Best Adaptation of a Theatre Work	Argelino, servidor de dos amos	Won	
2013	22nd Actors and Actresses Union Awards	Best Stage Actor in a Leading Role	Hamlet	Nominated	
2015	24th Actors and Actresses Union Awards	Best Film Actor in a Secondary Role	The Ignorance of Blood	Nominated	
2016	25th Actors and Actresses Union Awards	Best Stage Actor in a Secondary Role	El rey	Nominated	
2017	26th Actors and Actresses Union Awards	Best Stage Actor in a Secondary Role	El rey	Nominated	
2018	28th Actors and Actresses Union Awards	Best Film Actor in a Leading Role	El rey	Nominated	
2021	8th Feroz Awards	Best Supporting Actor in a Film	The People Upstairs	Nominated	
2021	35th Goya Awards	Best Supporting Actor	The People Upstairs	Won	
2021	13th Gaudí Awards	Best Supporting Actor	The People Upstairs	Won	
2022	9th Feroz Awards	Best Supporting Actor in a Series	Reyes de la noche	Nominated	
2024	30th Forqué Awards	Best Actor in a Series	Cristóbal Balenciaga	Nominated	
2025	26th Iris Awards	Best Actor	Cristóbal Balenciaga	Won	
2025	17th Gaudí Awards	Best Actor	A House on Fire	Nominated	
2025	12th Feroz Awards	Best Supporting Actor in a Film	A House on Fire	Nominated	
2025	12th Feroz Awards	Best Main Actor in a Series	Cristóbal Balenciaga	Nominated	
2025	39th Goya Awards	Best Actor	A House on Fire	Nominated	
2025	33rd Actors and Actresses Union Awards	Best Film Actor in a Secondary Role	A House on Fire	Nominated	
2025	33rd Actors and Actresses Union Awards	Best Television Actor in a Leading Role	Cristóbal Balenciaga	Nominated	
2025	31st Forqué Awards	Best Actor in a Film	The Dinner	Nominated	
2026	13th Feroz Awards	Best Main Actor in a Film	The Dinner	Nominated	
2026	81st CEC Medals	Best Actor	The Dinner	Nominated	
2026	40th Goya Awards	Best Actor	The Dinner	Nominated	
2026	34th Actors and Actresses Union Awards	Best Film Actor in a Leading Role	The Dinner	Nominated	
2026	13th Platino Awards	Best Actor	The Dinner	Nominated	
2026	32nd Forqué Awards	Best Actor in a Film	The Light	Pending	
