= Sleepless in Madrid =

- Theatrical release poster
- Spanish: Insomnio
- Directed by: Chus Gutiérrez
- Screenplay by: Chus Gutiérrez; Juan Flahn; Fernando León
- Starring: Cristina Marcos; Candela Peña; Ernesto Alterio; María Pujalte; Ginés García Millán
- Cinematography: Arnaldo Catinari
- Music by: Mateo Alonso
- Production companies: Sogetel; Boca Boca Producciones
- Release date: 13 February 1998
- Country: Spain
- Language: Spanish
- Budget: 250 million ₧

Sleepless in Madrid or Insomnia (Spanish: Insomnio) is a 1998 Spanish comedy film directed by Chus Gutiérrez. It stars Cristina Marcos, Candela Peña, Ernesto Alterio, María Pujalte and Ginés García Millán.

== Plot ==
Set in Madrid, focusing on the psychological developments and casual relationships through the urban routine of a group of young people, and bringing in elements of costumbrismo mixed with metaphors of a "self-absorbed" social environment, the plot tracks the lives of three sleepless people, Evan, Alba and Juan (and their partners) during the hot summer. Adrián is with Alba (a mother who has just given birth) whereas Juan is worried by his future with his would-be wife Isabel.

== Cast ==
- Cristina Marcos as Eva
- Candela Peña as Alba
- Ernesto Alterio as Juan
- María Pujalte as Isabel
- Ginés García Millán as Adrián
- Fele Martínez as Rafa
- Pedro Alonso
- Chete Lera as Agustín
- Alberto San Juan
- Saturnino García as padre de Isabel
- Celia Ballester as madre de Isabel

== Production ==
The screenplay is the result of the mashup of three different screenplays (two of them jointly worked by Chus Gutiérrez and Juan Flahn and a third one in which Fernando León de Aranoa also participated). The film was produced by Bocaboca and Sogetel. Arnaldo Catinari was responsible for the cinematography whereas Mateo Alonso was responsible for the music. The budget amounted to 250 million ₧.

== Release ==
The film was theatrically released in Spain on 13 February 1998.

== Reception ==
Augusto Martínez Torres of El País assessed the film to be a "fun comedy that works perfectly".

== See also ==
- List of Spanish films of 1998

== Bibliography ==
- Colmeiro, José; Gabilondo, Joseba (2013). "Negotiating the Local and the Global: Andalusia, the Basque Country, and Galicia". In Labanyi, Jo; Pavlović, Tatjana (eds.). A Companion to Spanish Cinema. Blackwell Publishing. pp. 81–110. ISBN 978-1-4051-9438-9.
- Gómez Alonso, Rafael (2011). "Bright Young Things: Neo-existentialism in Madrid cinema of the 1990's". World Film Locations Madrid. Intellect Books, The University of Chicago Press. pp. 118–120. ISBN 978-1-84150-568-8.
- Losilla, Carlos (1999). "El fantasma, su sombra y el lector por horas. Diez apuntes sobre el cine español de 1998" (PDF). Banda aparte: Revista de Cine - Formas de Ver (14–15). Valencia: 62–70. ISSN 1138-1981 – via Universitat Politècnica de València.
