= Raúl Peña =

Spanish actor and singer

Raúl Peña (born 21 March 1977) is a Spanish stage and screen actor and singer known for appearing as Carmelo Leal in the long-running telenovela El secreto de Puente Viejo.

== Biography ==
Peña studied interpretation and has trained in several workshops and seminars, such as those given by José Carlos Plaza and Mariano Barroso. He started in the theater in 1995 and since then has worked in various montages, series, and other vehicles.

He debuted portraying a student on the series Un paso adelante, from 2002 to 2004. In 2011 he joined the cast of the series La Señora, with Adriana Ugarte. In 2014, he obtained a regular role in the series Victor Ros on Televisión Española, which ended after one season, when Peña went to play the role of Carmelo Leal in the series El Secreto de Puente Viejo.

== Theatre ==
- Trabajos de amor perdido de Carlos Marchena.
- Casa con dos puertas mala es de guardar by Calderón de la Barca.
- Noches de amor efímero
- Romeo y Julieta (musical) by Paco Suárez.
- El otro lado de la cama by Josep Maria Mestres.
- La Bella y la Bestia by Disney.
- Frankenstein by Mary Shelley.
- Burundanga (2016), by Jordi Galceran.

== Film ==
- Gente pez de Jorge Iglesias (2001)
- Cándida de Guillermo Fesser (2006).
- Caótica Ana de Julio Medem (2009)
- Desechos de David Marqués (2010)

== Music ==
- SMS (grupo de la serie SMS: Sin miedo a soñar) (2007) (Grupo disuelto).
- SMS (grupo de la serie SMS: Sin miedo a soñar) – Qué quieres que te diga Globomedia Music S.A./ EMI Music S.A. (+20.000 CD´S vendidos) (Grupo disuelto).
- UPA Dance (grupo de la serie Un paso adelante Contigo (2005) -(+50.000 copias vendidas) No. 4 España Disco de Oro)

== Television ==
=== Episodic roles ===
- El comisario como él mismo, Telecinco (1999–2009) (1 episode)
- Hospital Central como él mismo, Telecinco (2000–2012) (1 episode)
- Los misterios de Laura, cómo Javier Sancho, La 1 (2 episode)
- Ciega a citas como David, Cuatro (2014) (10 episode)
- Víctor Ros como Juan Rosales, La 1 (2015–2016)

=== Recurring roles ===
- Antivicio como Javier, de Antena 3 TV (2000).
- Compañeros como Carolo, y, posteriormente, como PC, de Globomedia para Antena 3 TV (2000–2001).
- Un paso adelante como Jerónimo Ruiz "Jero", de Globomedia para Antena 3 TV (2002–2005).
- SMS como Edu, de Globomedia para La Sexta (2006–2007).
- La Señora como Hugo de Viana, de Diagonal TV para TVE 1 (2008–2010).
- República como Hugo de Viana, de Diagonal TV para TVE 1 (2011).
- El secreto de Puente Viejo como Carmelo Leal para Antena 3 (2014–2019)
- Habitaciones cerradas como Juan Lax para TVE 1 (2015).

=== Programs ===
- Desesperado Club Social de Antena 3 TV (1999–2000).
- PuntoDoc de Antena 3 TV (2007–2008).
- Malas Compañías de La Sexta (2009).
- Pasapalabra (Capítulos 1654–1656) (mayo-2013)
- Hermano mayor (2013)
