= You Shall Die in Chafarinas =

- Theatrical release poster
- Spanish: Morirás en Chafarinas
- Directed by: Pedro Olea
- Screenplay by: Fernando Lalana; Pedro Olea
- Based on: Morirás en Chafarinas by Fernando Lalana
- Starring: Jorge Sanz; María Barranco; Óscar Ladoire; Javier Albalá; Toni Zenet; Esperanza Campuzano; Ramón Langa
- Cinematography: Paco Femenía
- Edited by: José Salcedo
- Music by: Bernardo Bonezzi
- Production company: Altube Filmeak
- Distributed by: Columbia TriStar Films de España
- Release date: 21 April 1995
- Country: Spain
- Language: Spanish

You Shall Die in Chafarinas (Spanish: Morirás en Chafarinas) is a 1995 crime thriller film directed by Pedro Olea. It is based on the novel Morirás en Chafarinas by Fernando Lalana. It stars Jorge Sanz and María Barranco alongside Óscar Ladoire and Javier Albalá.

== Plot ==
Featuring the backdrop of military conscription and set in a military barracks in Melilla, the plot touches themes such as the suicide of conscripts and substance consumption. Two begrudging privates (Jaime and Cidraque) see themselves forced to act as casual investigators in the wake of series of deaths in the barracks (two deaths from overdose and the ensuing killing of a homosexual conscript).

== Cast ==
- Jorge Sanz as Jaime
- María Barranco as Elisa
- Javier Albalá as Cidraque
- Óscar Ladoire as Capitán Contreras
- Toni Zenet as Adolfo
- Esperanza Campuzano as Victoria
- Ramón Langa as Gayarre
- Miguel del Arco
- David González
- Ramón Goyanes
- Javier Lago
- Ernesto Alterio
- Guillermo Toledo
- Vicente Villanueva
- Achraff Boummina
- Francisco Boira
- Mohamed Ouaglou
- Antonio Dechent
- Alberto San Juan
- Pepón Nieto
- Txema Blasco
- Antonio de la Torre

== Production ==
Based on the 1990 novel Morirás en Chafarinas by Fernando Lalana, the screenplay was penned by Pedro Olea and Francisco Lalana. The film is an Altube Filmeak SL production, with the participation of TVE. Shooting locations included a barracks in Aranjuez, Community of Madrid.

== Release ==
Distributed by Columbia Tri-Star Films de España, the film was theatrically released in Spain on 21 April 1995.

== Reception ==
Casimiro Torreiro of El País assessed that, while the script apparently features seemingly everything to be functional for an entertaining narration, the writing "lacks work to polish the details", concluding that "no one will be able to say that [the film] is not a well shot and interpreted film. But that alone is not enough to achieve a satisfactory product."

== See also ==
- List of Spanish films of 1995
