= Carmen de la Maza =

Spanish actress (1940–2022)

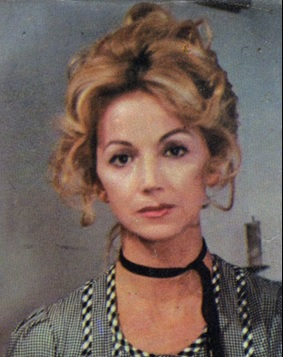
- Born: Carmen Sáinz de la Maza y de la Serna; 23 August 1940; San Sebastián, Spain
- Died: 14 January 2022 (aged 81); Madrid, Spain
- Spouse: Agustín Navarro
- Children: 3
- Father: Regino Sainz de la Maza
- Relatives: Concha Espina (grandmother)

Carmen Sáinz de la Maza y de la Serna (23 August 1940 – 14 January 2022) was a Spanish actress. She was known for her performances in Juncal and Estudio 1 plays.

== Biography ==
Carmen Sáinz de la Maza y de la Serna was born in San Sebastián, Gipuzkoa, on 23 August 1940. She was however based in Madrid since her earliest childhood. She was the daughter of Regino Sainz de la Maza, granddaughter of Concha Espina and niece of Víctor de la Serna. She studied drama in Madrid. She took her first steps as an actress in theatre works (making her professional debut in a play of Five Finger Exercise), whereas she made her film debut in Canción de juventud (1962). She rose to prominence for her appearances in Estudio 1 televised plays.

Her most known television role was her performance as Julia Muñoz in Jaime de Armiñán's Juncal. She also featured in drama series Una gloria nacional.

She was married to Agustín Navarro (died 2001), with whom she had 3 children. She later had a relationship with José Luis López Vázquez.

She made her last film performance in 2010 drama Anything You Want. Late television credits include performances in Hospital Central, El Comisario, El pasado es mañana, El don de Alba, and Águila Roja, her last television appearance. She died on 14 January 2022 in Madrid.

== Filmography ==
=== Film ===
Year	Title	Role	Notes	Ref.
1962	Canción de juventud		Film debut	
1964	Proceso de conciencia			
1975	Los pájaros de Baden-Baden			
1977	Casa Manchada			
1996	Más allá del jardín (Beyond the Garden)	Soledad		
1997	Airbag			
2004	El asombroso mundo de Borjamari y Pocholo (The Amazing World of Borjamari and Pocholo)	Concha de Robles		
2010	Todo lo que tú quieras (Anything You Want)		Last film performance	

=== Television ===
Year	Title	Role	Notes	Ref.
1966	Habitación 508			
1977	Mujeres insólitas	Inés de Castro		
1989	Juncal	Julia Muñoz		
1993	Una gloria nacional			
