= With or Without Love =

- Spanish theatrical release poster
- Spanish: Una hora más en Canarias
- Directed by: David Serrano
- Written by: Olga Iglesias; David Serrano
- Produced by: Tomás Cimadevilla
- Starring: Quim Gutiérrez; Angie Cepeda; Juana Acosta; Eduardo Blanco; Miren Ibarguren; Kiti Manver; Diego Martín; Isabel Ordaz
- Cinematography: Carlos Ferro
- Edited by: Nacho Ruiz Capillas
- Music by: Ernesto Millán
- Production companies: Telespan 2000; Lazona; Dynamo
- Distributed by: Vértice Cine (es); UIP (co)
- Release dates: 23 April 2010 (Málaga); 16 July 2010 (Spain); 5 August 2011 (Colombia)
- Countries: Spain; Colombia
- Language: Spanish

With or Without Love (released as Una hora más en Canarias in Spain and Con amor y sin amor in Colombia) is a 2010 Spanish-Colombian screwball musical comedy film directed by David Serrano and written by Olga Iglesias and Serrano which stars Quim Gutiérrez, Angie Cepeda, Juana Acosta, and Miren Ibarguren.

== Plot ==
Married Claudia, dumped by lover Pablo for Elena, wants to win Pablo back, with help from sister Mónica, without factoring in the possibility of the latter also falling for Pablo.

== Cast ==
- Quim Gutiérrez as Pablo
- Angie Cepeda as Claudia
- Juana Acosta as Mónica
- Eduardo Blanco as Eduardo
- Miren Ibarguren as Elena
- Kiti Manver as Daniela
- Diego Martín as Germán
- Isabel Ordaz as Noelia

== Production ==
The film is a Telespan 2000, Lazona, and Dynamo Spanish-Colombian co-production with the participation of TVE and Canal+. Shooting locations in Tenerife included Garachico, Icod de los Vinos, La Laguna, El Bollullo beach, the Tenerife South Airport, and Buenavista. Cepeda (from Cartagena) and Acosta (from Cali) agreed on both using a Bogotá accent to pass as sisters. It was released theatrically in Colombia on 5 August 2011 by UIP.

== Release ==
The film premiered at the 13th Málaga Film Festival on 23 April 2010. Distributed by Vértice Cine, it was released theatrically in Spain on 16 July 2010 in 275 screens, with a €262,800 opening weekend. It ended up grossing just over €0.8 million at the Spanish box office.

== Reception ==
Jonathan Holland of Variety deemed the "technically polished, fast-moving screwball musical laffer" to also be a "retrograde hit-and-miss fare with a reheated script, a truly appalling score and many failed gags".

Nando Salvà of El Periódico de Catalunya wrote that the film "fails to balance its aspirations as a romantic comedy with its pedestrian and trite attempts to emulate Howard Hawks' screwball comedies or with its orthopedic musical numbers".

Irene Crespo of Cinemanía rated the film 3 out of 5 stars, highlighting how Quim Gutiérrez reveals himself as the Hugh Grant of Spanish romantic comedy.

== See also ==
- List of Spanish films of 2010
