= Washington Wolves =

- Theatrical release poster
- Spanish: Los lobos de Washington
- Directed by: Mariano Barroso
- Screenplay by: Juan Cavestany
- Produced by: Francisco Ramos
- Starring: Javier Bardem; Eduard Fernández; Ernesto Alterio; Alberto San Juan; José Sancho
- Cinematography: Néstor Calvo
- Edited by: Pablo Blanco
- Music by: Bingen Mendizabal
- Production companies: Aurum Producciones; Sogetel
- Distributed by: Alta Films
- Release date: 1999
- Country: Spain
- Language: Spanish

Washington Wolves (Spanish: Los lobos de Washington) is a 1999 Spanish thriller film directed by Mariano Barroso and written by Juan Cavestany which stars Javier Bardem, Eduard Fernández, Ernesto Alterio, Alberto San Juan and José Sancho.

== Plot ==
Miguel and Alberto want to scam their old boss 20 million pesetas with a disorganized plan along with several other people such as the mistress of their boss's wife. One of their partners, Claudio has managed to have a comfortable life while Miguel and Alberto they have been mistreated by life leading a life of misery. A mixture of despair and need will make them skin like wounded wolves in the night.

== Cast ==
- Javier Bardem as Alberto
- Eduard Fernández as Miguel
- José Sancho as Claudio
- Ernesto Alterio as Pablo
- Alberto San Juan
- María Pujalte as Sara
- Vicenta Ndongo as Elena
- Manuel Morón
- Juan Carlos Vellido as hombre-bala

== Production ==
Washington Wolves was produced by Aurum Producciones and Sogetel, in association with Pinguin Films, with collaboration of Canal+ and participation of Antena 3.

== Reception ==
Jonathan Holland of Variety deemed the film (a thriller "worthy of mention") to be a "a stylish, superbly played and well-written piece about luckless criminals", "let down only by some sloppy plotting and a couple of characters too many".

== Accolades ==
Year	Award	Category	Nominee(s)	Result	Ref.
2000	14th Goya Awards	Best New Actor	Eduard Fernández	Nominated	

== See also ==
- List of Spanish films of 1999
