= The 2 Sides of the Bed =

- Theatrical release poster
- Spanish: Los 2 lados de la cama
- Directed by: Emilio Martínez Lázaro
- Written by: David Serrano
- Starring: Ernesto Alterio; Guillermo Toledo; Alberto San Juan; María Esteve; Pilar Castro; Lucía Jiménez; Secun de la Rosa; Juana Acosta; Verónica Sánchez
- Cinematography: Juan Molina
- Edited by: Fernando Pardo
- Music by: Roque Baños
- Production companies: Telespan Producciones; Estudios Picasso; Impala
- Distributed by: Buena Vista International
- Release date: 21 December 2005
- Country: Spain
- Language: Spanish

The 2 Sides of the Bed (Spanish: Los 2 lados de la cama) is a 2005 Spanish musical comedy film directed by Emilio Martínez Lázaro and written by David Serrano which stars Ernesto Alterio, Guillermo Toledo, Alberto San Juan, María Esteve, Pilar Castro, Lucía Jiménez, Secun de la Rosa, Juana Acosta and Verónica Sánchez. It is a sequel to the 2002 box-office hit The Other Side of the Bed.

== Plot ==
Set three years after the events of The Other Side of the Bed, the male protagonists from the original film (Pedro, Rafa and Javier) have somewhat matured. Javier wants to marry Marta, Pedro wants a future with Raquel, whereas Rafa is happy with Pilar. Yet when the wedding is approaching, things take a crazy turn, as Marta becomes irresolute about the marrying prospect and makes it out with Raquel in the bathroom of a restaurant.

== Cast ==
- Ernesto Alterio as Javier
- Verónica Sánchez as Marta
- Guillermo Toledo as Pedro
- Lucía Jiménez as Raquel
- Alberto San Juan as Rafa
- María Esteve as Pilar
- Pilar Castro as Carlota
- Secun de la Rosa as Carlos
- Juana Acosta as Gema

== Production ==
The screenplay was penned by David Serrano. The film was produced by Telespan Producciones, Estudios Picasso and Impala and it had the participation of Tele 5 and Canal+. Shooting lasted for 9 weeks and it took place in Madrid.

== Release ==
Distributed by Buena Vista International, the film was theatrically released in Spain on 21 December 2005. The film was the highest-grossing Spanish film in the first trimester of 2006 (with €4.36 million in the aforementioned period).

== Reception ==
Mirito Torreiro of Fotogramas rated the film 3 out of 5 stars highlighting the musical adaptations by Roque Baños and (the singing) Lucía Jiménez as the best things about the film.

Jonathan Holland of Variety considered the film "a more enjoyable follow-up" to the first film, featuring a "more substantial script and a more mature air this time round result in a slightly darker, richer experience".

== See also ==
- List of Spanish films of 2005
