= The Ugliest Woman in the World =

- Film poster
- Spanish: La mujer más fea del mundo
- Directed by: Miguel Bardem
- Screenplay by: Nacho Faerna
- Starring: Elia Galera; Roberto Álvarez; Héctor Alterio; Javivi; Guillermo Toledo; Enrique Villén; David Pinilla; Pablo Pinedo; Alberto San Juan
- Cinematography: Néstor Calvo
- Edited by: Iván Aledo
- Music by: Juan Bardem
- Production company: Aurum Producciones
- Release dates: 11 October 1999 (Sitges); 5 November 1999 (Spain)
- Country: Spain
- Language: Spanish

The Ugliest Woman in the World (Spanish: La mujer más fea del mundo) is a 1999 Spanish science fiction comedy film directed by Miguel Bardem from a screenplay by Nacho Faerna which stars Elia Galera and Roberto Álvarez.

== Plot ==
The plot is set in a futuristic 2011 Madrid, capital of the 3rd (Spanish) Republic. Extremely ugly woman Lola Otero is transformed into a beauty in the wake of an experiment carried out by a mad scientist, thereby going into a killing rampage to take revenge for all the humiliations she has suffered.

== Cast ==
- Elia Galera as Lola Otero
- Roberto Álvarez as teniente Arribas
- Héctor Alterio as Dr. Werner
- Javivi as sargento Pelayo
- Alberto San Juan as Luis Casanova
- Enrique Villén as Abella
- Guillermo Toledo as Lafuente
- David Pinilla as Pizarro
- Pablo Pinedo as León
- Saturnino García as forense
- Luis Ciges as el anciano vicioso
- María Isbert as la anciana borde
- Anabel Alonso as Rocío

== Production ==
The screenplay was penned by Nacho Faerna. The film is an Aurum Producciones production.

== Release ==
The film was presented at the 32nd Sitges Film Festival in October 1999. It was released theatrically in Spain on 5 November 1999.

== Accolades ==
Year	Award	Category	Nominee(s)	Result	Ref.
2000	14th Goya Awards	Best New Director	Miguel Bardem	Nominated	
2000	14th Goya Awards	Best Special Effects	Alejandro Álvarez, David Martí, José Álvarez, Reyes Abades	Nominated	

== See also ==
- List of Spanish films of 1999
