= The Other Side of the Bed =

2002 Spanish musical comedy film

- Theatrical release poster
- Spanish: El otro lado de la cama
- Directed by: Emilio Martínez Lázaro
- Written by: David Serrano
- Produced by: Tomás Cimadevilla; José Sáinz de Vicuña
- Starring: Ernesto Alterio; Paz Vega; Guillermo Toledo; Natalia Verbeke; Alberto San Juan; María Esteve
- Cinematography: Juan Molina
- Music by: Roque Baños
- Production companies: Impala; Telespan 2000
- Distributed by: Buena Vista International
- Release dates: 27 April 2002 (Málaga); 5 July 2002 (Spain)
- Running time: 114 minutes
- Country: Spain
- Language: Spanish
- Box office: €12.6 million

The Other Side of the Bed (Spanish: El otro lado de la cama) a.k.a. The Wrong Side of the Bed is a 2002 Spanish musical comedy film directed by Emilio Martínez Lázaro and written by David Serrano, which stars Ernesto Alterio, Paz Vega, Guillermo Toledo and Natalia Verbeke alongside Alberto San Juan and María Esteve. A box-office hit, it became the highest-grossing Spanish film in the domestic market in 2002.

== Plot ==
Sex, love, lies, bed-hopping and mistaken identities abound in this pop musical-comedy set in Madrid. The gorgeous Paula breaks up with her boyfriend Pedro in order to continue her affair with Javier. The immature Javier however, is unwilling to break up with his current girlfriend Sonia, or confess to their affair to Pedro, who happens to be his best friend.

== Cast ==
- Ernesto Alterio as Javier
- Paz Vega as Sonia
- Guillermo Toledo as Pedro
- Natalia Verbeke as Paula
- Alberto San Juan as Rafa
- María Esteve as Pilar
- Ramón Barea as Sagaz
- Nathalie Poza as Lucia
- Secun de la Rosa as Carlos

== Release ==
The film screened at the Málaga Film Festival in 2002. It was theatrically released in Spain on 5 July 2002.

== Reception ==
On review aggregator website Rotten Tomatoes, the film holds an approval rating of 49% based on 43 reviews, with an average rating of 5.2/10.

== Sequel ==
The film was followed three years later by a sequel entitled The 2 Sides of the Bed. Martínez-Lázaro and Serrano return as director and screenwriter while Alterio, Toledo, San Juan, Esteve and de la Rosa all reprise their roles.

== Adaptations ==
In 2004, a musical adaptation of the film was made under the same name; it premiered in Madrid on 16 September.

A French remake entitled Cheating Love (On va s'aimer in French speaking markets) was released in 2006. It was written and directed by Ivan Calbérac and stars Julien Boisselier, Alexandra Lamy, Mélanie Doutey and Gilles Lellouche among others.

== See also ==
- List of Spanish films of 2002
