= David Serrano (filmmaker) =

Spanish filmmaker (born 1975)

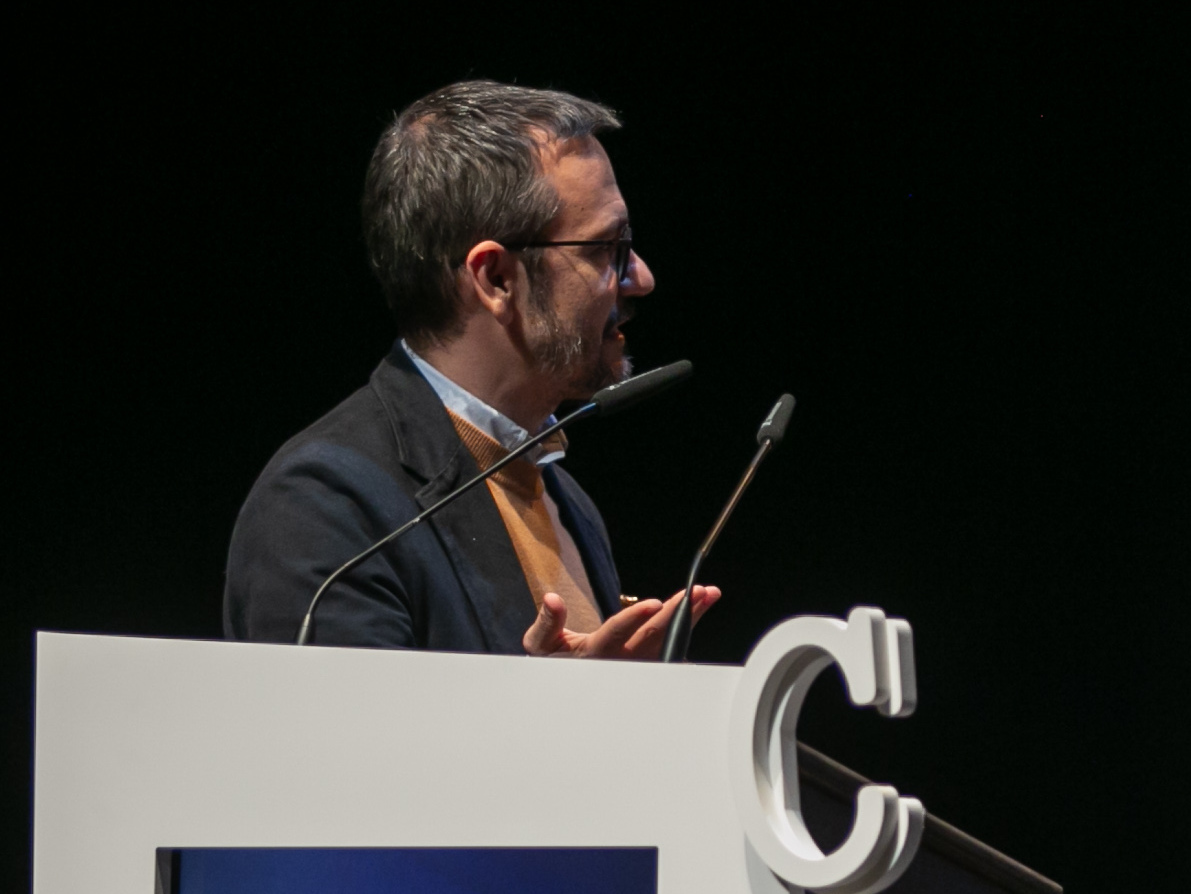
- Serrano in November 2023
- Born: David Serrano de la Peña; 1975 (age 50–51); Madrid, Spain
- Occupations: Screenwriter; film director; producer; playwright; television director

David Serrano de la Peña (born 1975) is a Spanish filmmaker as well as writer and adapter of musical stage plays.

== Biography ==
David Serrano de la Peña was born in Madrid in 1975. He penned the screenplay of the box-office hit The Other Side of the Bed, a 2002 musical comedy film directed by Emilio Martínez Lázaro, also taking over writing duties of its 2005 sequel, The 2 Sides of the Bed. His feature film directorial debut was the 2003 comedy Football Days, earning a nomination for the Goya Award for Best New Director. He has since directed Cinema Days (2007), With or Without Love (2010), We Need to Talk (2016), and Voy a pasármelo bien (2022).

In addition to his work in the film industry, Serrano has also written and adapted musical plays such as Hoy no me puedo Levantar (writer), Billy Elliot (adapter), and Más de cien mentiras (writer), as well as directed episodes of the 2019 comedy television series Vota Juan.

== Filmography ==
=== Film ===
Title	Year	Director	Writer	Notes
2002	Al otro lado de la cama	No	Yes	
2003	Días de fútbol	Yes	Yes	
2005	Los 2 lados de la cama	No	Yes	
2007	Días de cine	Yes	Yes	
2010	Una hora más en Canarias	Yes	Yes	
2016	Tenemos que hablar	Yes	Yes	
2016	El pregón	No	Yes	
2022	Voy a pasármelo bien	Yes	Yes	
2025	Voy a pasármelo mejor	No	Yes	
2026	Lapönia	Yes	No	

=== Television ===
Title	Year	Notes
2019	Vota Juan	Miniseries; Directed 4 episodes
