= Ernesto Alterio =

Argentine-Spanish actor

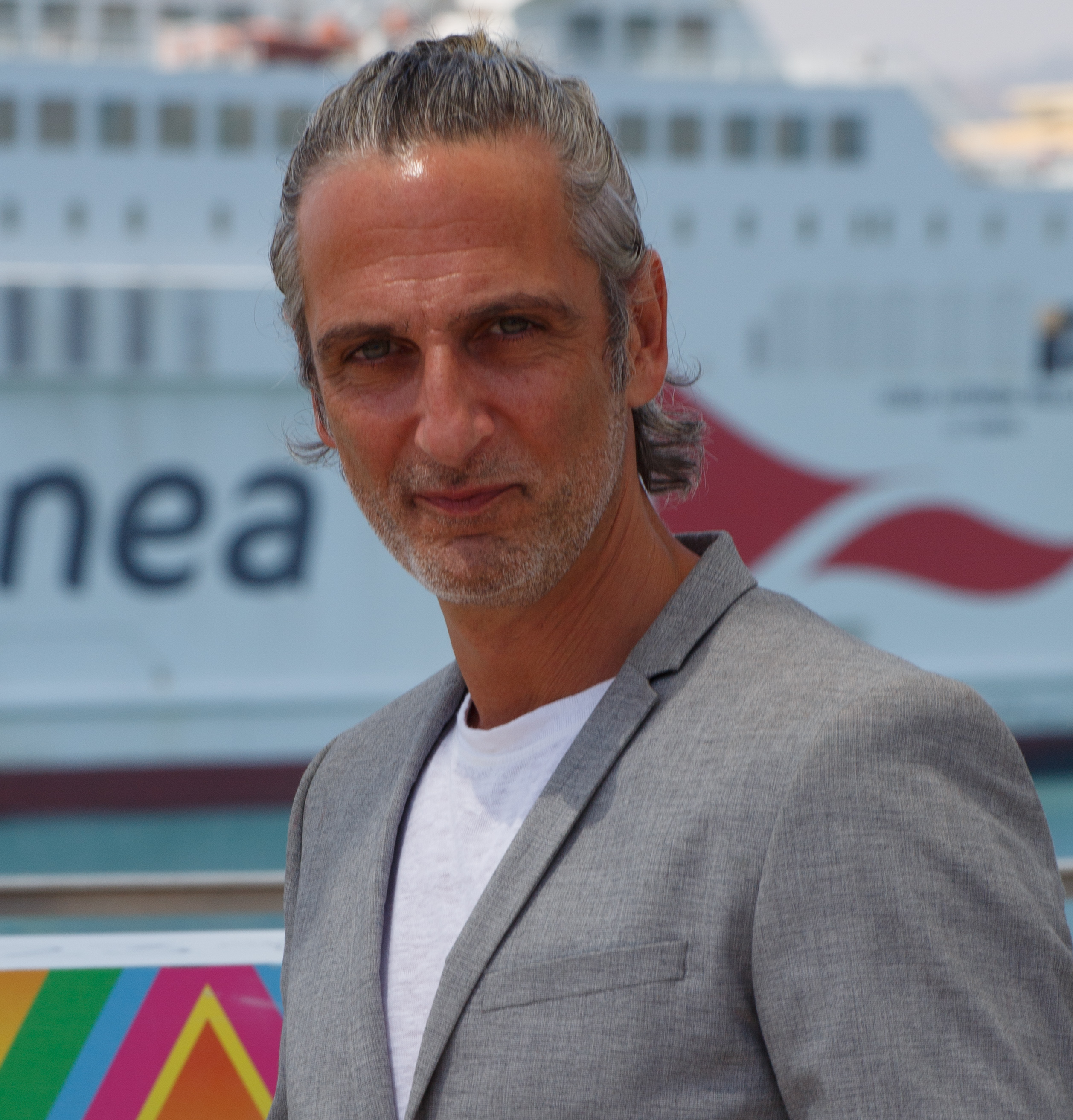
- Alterio in 2020
- Born: 25 September 1970 (age 55); Buenos Aires, Argentina
- Citizenship: Argentina; Spain
- Occupation: Actor
- Children: 1
- Father: Héctor Alterio
- Relatives: Malena Alterio (sister)

Ernesto Federico Alterio Bacaicoa (born 25 September 1970) is an Argentine and Spanish film, theatre, and television actor. He is the son of Argentine actor Hector Alterio.

== Life and career ==
Ernesto Federico Alterio Bacaicoa was born in Buenos Aires on 25 September 1970. Alterio is the son of psychologist Modesta Ángela Bacaicoa Destéfano and actor Héctor Alterio Onorato. His younger sister Malena also pursued an acting career. He is of Italian descent; his grandparents were originally from Carpinone, a commune in the province of Isernia, in the Molise region. During the Isabel Perón government that took power shortly after Malena's birth, his father Héctor Alterio was threatened by Triple A, so the family went into exile and settled in Spain (where Héctor was working at the time) between 1974 and 1975.

Settling with his family in Madrid when he was four years old, Ernesto suffered the uprooting that exile brings. He remained attached to his Argentine roots through family traditions. Like his father, Alterio acquired Spanish citizenship along with the Argentine one. He began biology studies but left to take up history, and continued with those studies for two years. Encouraged to be like his father, Ernesto said that he went "sideways, skirting the edge of the pond so as not to fall into it: music, photography, history..." until he made the decision to accept being an actor. He trained in acting under Cristina Rota.

He made his big screen debut in 1992 with a small appearance in Shooting Elizabeth along with Jeff Goldblum. It was followed by minor appearances in You Shall Die in Chafarinas and Mi nombre es sombra.

In 1996, he founded the theatre group Ración de Oreja (seed of Animalario) together with Alberto San Juan, Guillermo Toledo, and Nathalie Poza.

He landed some early leading film roles under Fernando Colomo in the late 1990s with performances in The Stolen Years (for which he earned a nomination to the Goya Award for Best New Actor) and Havana Quartet. Starting in 2003, Alterio had a 15-year-long relationship with actress Juana Acosta, with whom he had one daughter.

He has starred in the cult miniseries Vientos del agua with his father, and has twice worked with director Marcelo Piñeyro, who frequently cast his father in roles. He works both in Spanish and Argentine television.

== Selected filmography ==
=== Film ===
Year	Title	Role	Notes	Ref.
1992	Tango Feroz			
1995	Belmonte			
1995	Morirás en Chafarinas (You Shall Die in Chafarinas)			
1996	Tengo una casa (I Have a House)	Nico		
1996	Más que amor, frenesí (Not Love, Just Frenzy)			
1996	Mi nombre es sombra			
1997	Dos por dos	Mateo		
1998	Los años bárbaros (The Stolen Years)	Jaime		
1998	Insomnio (Sleepless in Madrid)	Juan		
1999	Los lobos de Washington (Washington Wolves)	Pablo		
1999	Cuarteto de La Habana (Havana Quartet)	Walther		
2000	Kasbah	Mario		
2000	Yoyes	Joxean Dorronsoro		
2001	Buñuel y la mesa del rey Salomón	Salvador Dalí		
2001	Juego de Luna (Luna's Game)	Nano		
2002	El otro lado de la cama (The Other Side of the Bed)	Javier		
2002	Deseo (Desire)	Julio		
2003	Días de fútbol (Football Days)	Antonio		
2004	Muertos comunes (Common Dead)	Fermín		
2004	Incautos (Swindled)	Ernesto		
2005	Semen, una historia de amor (Semen, A Love Story)	Serafín		
2005	El método (The Method)	Enrique		
2006	Los 2 lados de la cama (The 2 Sides of the Bed)	Javier	Sequel to The Other Side of the Bed	
2008	Rivales (Rivals)	Guillermo		
2009	Las viudas de los jueves (The Widows of Thursdays)	Martín		
2011	Infancia clandestina (Clandestine Childhood)	Tío Beto ('uncle Beto')		
2013	¿Quién mató a Bambi? (Who Killed Bambi?)	Edu		
2014	Sexo fácil, películas tristes (Easy Sex, Sad Movies)	Pablo Diuk		
2015	Incidencias (Stranded)	José María		
2017	Perfectos desconocidos (Perfect Strangers)	Antonio		
2018	La sombra de la ley (Gun City)	El Tísico		
2019	Lo dejo cuando quiera (I Can Quit Whenever I Want)	Tacho		
2019	Ventajas de viajar en tren (Advantages of Travelling by Train)	Ángel Sanagustín		
2020	Te quiero, imbécil (I Love You, Stupid)	Sebastian Vennet		
2020	Orígenes secretos (Unknown Origins)	Bruguera		
2020	Un mundo normal (The Sea Beyond)	Ernesto		
2021	Donde caben dos (More the Merrier)	Alberto		
2022	El cuarto pasajero (Four's a Crowd)	Juan Carlos		
2023	Mari(dos) (Co-Husbands)	Emilio		
2023	Moscas (Flies)	Luis Machi		
2025	Un funeral de locos	Robert		
2025	Todos los lados de la cama (Every Side of the Bed)	Javier		
2026	Karateka			

=== Television ===
Year	Title	Role	Notes	Ref.
2017	Cable Girls	Sebastián Uribe		
2018	Narcos: Mexico	Salvador Osuna Nava		
2020	Someone Has to Die	Gregorio Falcón		
2021	Todos mienten	Diego		
2025	Su majestad	Guillermo		

== Accolades ==
Year	Award	Category	Work	Result	Ref.
1999	13th Goya Awards	Best New Actor	The Stolen Years	Nominated	
2005	18th Goya Awards	Best Actor	Football Days	Nominated	
2021	35th Goya Awards	Best Actor	The Sea Beyond	Nominated	
