= Diego Martín (actor) =

Spanish actor (born 1974)

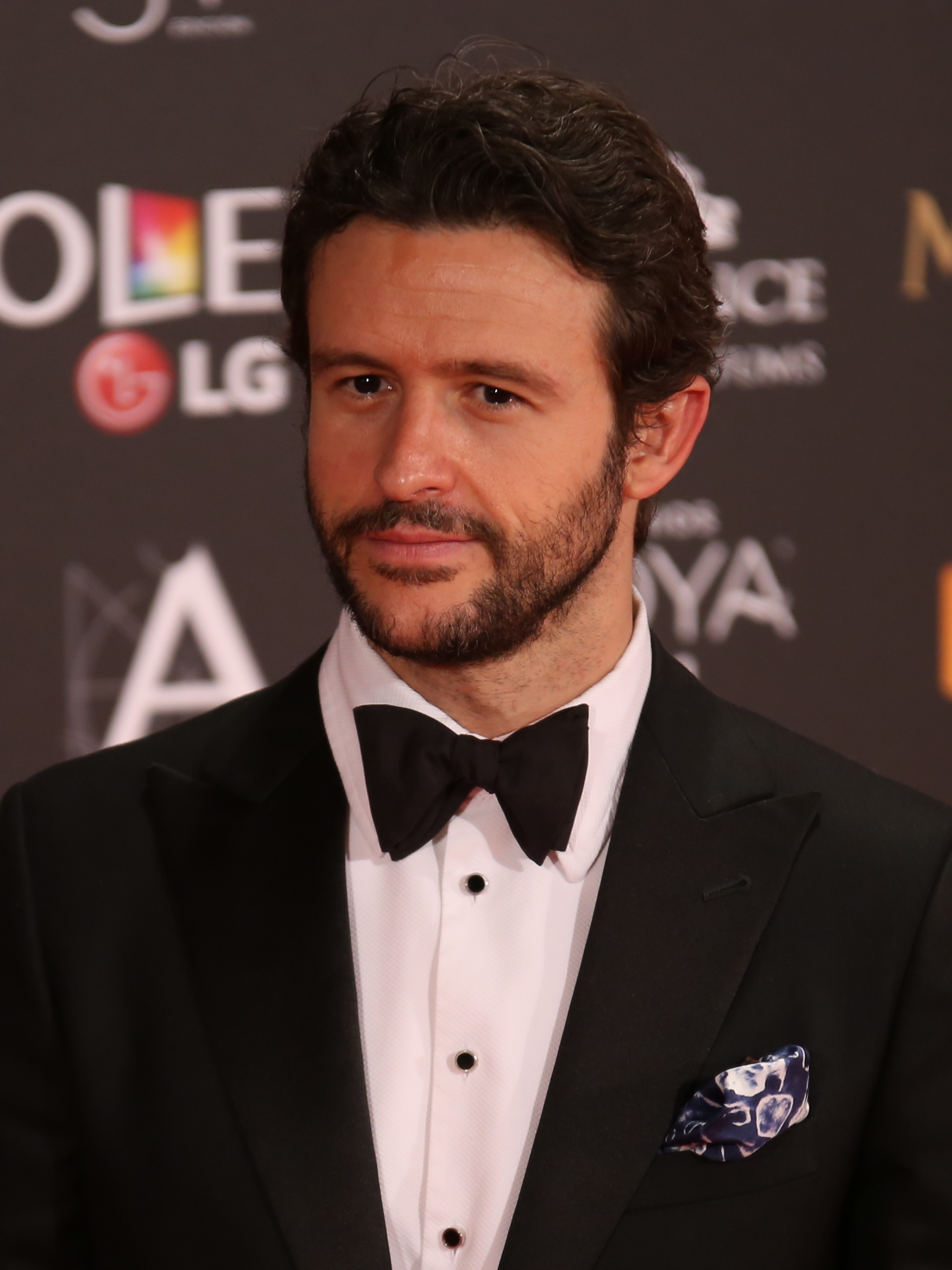
- Martín at the 31st Goya Awards in 2017
- Born: 21 September 1974 (age 51); Madrid, Spain
- Occupation: Actor

Diego Martín Gabriel (born 21 September 1974) is a Spanish actor, known for his performances in prime time television series, including Policías, en el corazón de la calle; Aquí no hay quien viva, Hermanos y detectives and Velvet.

== Biography ==
Born on 21 September 1974 in Madrid, he has wrongly claimed sometimes to have been born in Valladolid because of an emotional bonding, as he spent part of his youth there during weekends and holidays, due to his family having roots in the city: he has stated "My whole history with Valladolid is a story of my profession, a lie and a fiction. I have never felt very Madrilenian; Valladolid has always been my home, my landscape, my land, my smells". He is the grandson of poet Francisco Javier Martín Abril. After enrolling in a degree in law, he dropped out and started a career in acting instead.

He landed his first stable role in the TV series Periodistas in 1999.

== Filmography ==
Television

Year	Title	Role	Notes	Ref.
2000–2003	Policías, en el corazón de la calle	Jaime	83 episodes	
2003–2006	Aquí no hay quien viva	Carlos de Haro	56 episodes	
2004–2005	De moda	Víctor		
2005	Una nueva vida	Manu		
2007–2009	Hermanos y detectives	Dani Montero	26 episodes	
2010	La duquesa	Carlos, Duque de Huéscar	TV movie. Aired as miniseries	
2010–2011	Doctor Mateo	Nicolás Yubero		
2013	Familia	Miguel		
2014–2016	Velvet	Enrique Otegui		
2017–2019	Velvet Colección	Enrique Otegui		
2020	The Alienist	Narciso Linares		
2021–2022	Élite (Elite)	Benjamín	Introduced in season 4	
2021	Supernormal	Alfonso		
2024–2026	Death Inc.	José Miguel "Chemi" Fondao	26 episodes	

Film

Year	Title	Role	Notes	Ref.
2006	The Borgia	Perotto		
2007	Mataharis	Manuel		
2007	Un buen día lo tiene cualquiera	Arturo		
2009	Una hora más en Canarias (With or Without Love)	Germán		
2010	Pájaros de papel (Paper Birds)	Teniente Quiroga		
2011	Amigos...	Santi		
2012	[•REC]³: Génesis	Koldo		
2012	Tengo ganas de ti (I Want You)	Alejandro		
2018	Sin rodeos (Empowered)	Gabriel		
2018	Keep Going	Juan		
2019	Si yo fuera rico (If I Were Rich)	Mario		
2022	Un novio para mi mujer (A Boyfriend for My Wife)	Diego		
2023	El favor (Just One Small Favor)	Benja		
