= Pilar Castro =

Spanish actress (born 1970)

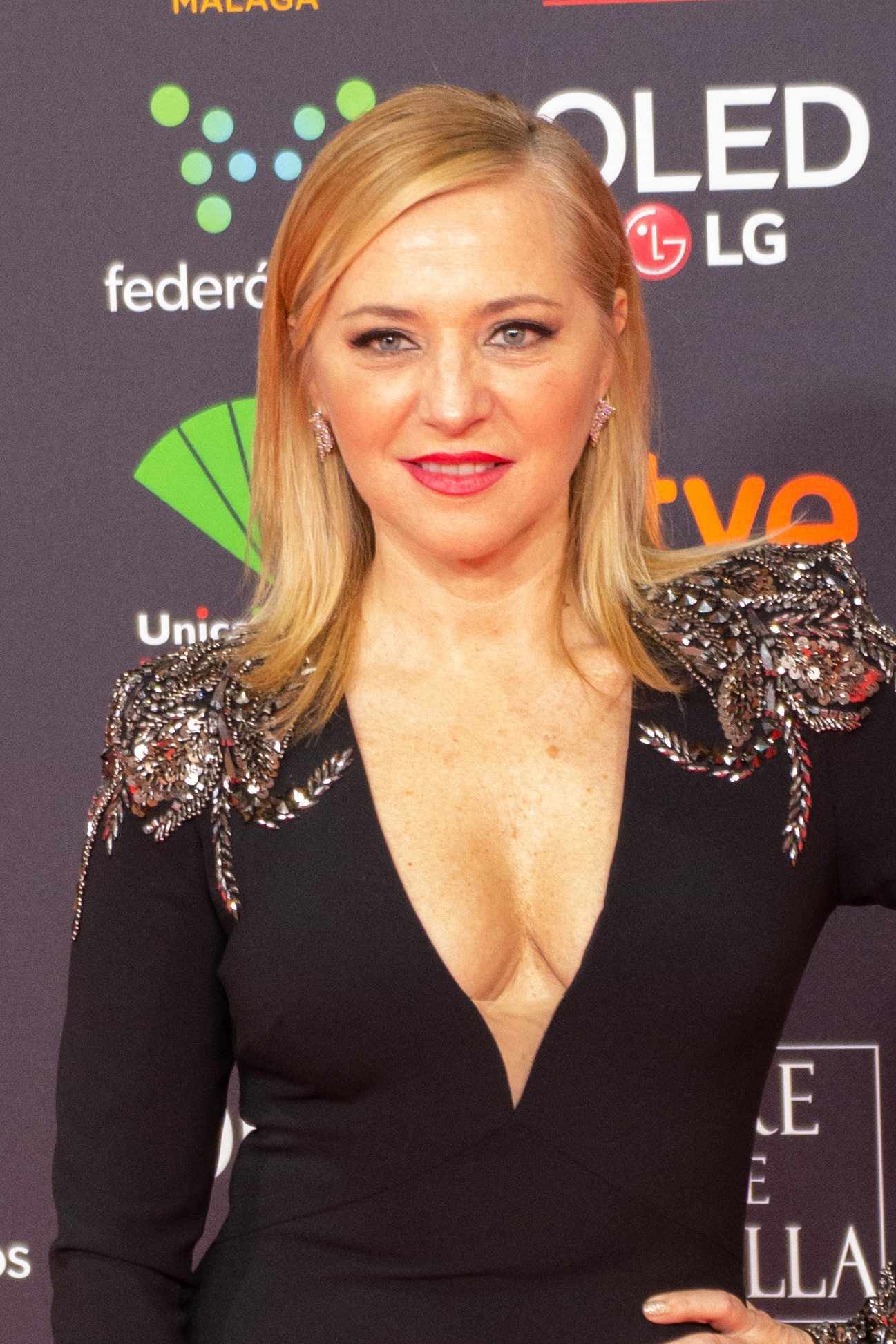
- At the 34th Goya Awards in 2020
- Born: 12 October 1970 (age 55); Madrid, Spain
- Occupation: Actress

Pilar Castro (born 12 October 1970) is a Spanish film, television and stage actress.

== Biography ==
Pilar Castro was born in Madrid on 12 October 1970. Before turning actress, she worked as a dancer. Then she trained her acting chops at Cristina Rota's school. She has since had a film, television and stage career. She landed her debut TV performance with a guest appearance in Este es mi barrio.

She hosted the 8th Feroz Awards in 2021.

== Filmography ==
=== Film ===
Year	Title	Role	Notes	Ref.
1990	Ovejas negras	Girl in the Cemetery (uncredited)		
1995	Historias del Kronen	Nuria		
1996	Taxi	Marga		
1996	El ángel de la guarda	Enfermera		
1998	El conductor	Marga		
1998	Agujetas en el alma	Irlandesa		
1999	Cuarteto de La Habana	Camarera		
1999	La mujer más fea del mundo	Feminista		
1999	Segunda piel	Neus		
2003	Descongélate! (Chill Out!)	Anita		
2003	Días de fútbol	Barbara		
2003	La suerte dormida	Sonia		
2004	Muertos comunes	Juani		
2004	El asombroso mundo de Borjamari y Pocholo (The Amazing World of Borjamari and Pocholo)	Paloma		
2005	Los 2 lados de la cama	Carlota		
2006	Volando voy	Srta. Pilar		
2006	Los aires difíciles	Charo/Elia		
2007	Gente de mala calidad	Lola		
2009	Siete minutos	Sonia		
2009	Gordos (Fat People)	Pilar		
2016	Julieta	Claudia		
2017	Es por tu bien (It's for Your Own Good)	Isabel		
2019	Ventajas de viajar en tren (Advantages of Travelling by Train)	Helga Pato		
2021	Competencia oficial (Official Competition)	Violeta		
2021	Donde caben dos (More the Merrier)	Claudia		
2022	Cerdita (Piggy)	Elena		
2022	A través de mi ventana (Through My Window)	Tere		
2023	Eres tú (Love at First Kiss)	Sonsoles Durán		
2023	A través del mar	Tere		
2024	A través de tu mirada	Tere		
2026	Altas capacidades (Better Class)	Mar		
2026	Los justos (The Righteous)	Cecilia		

=== Televisión ===
Year	Títle	Channel	Role	Notes
1996	Esté es mi barrio	Antena 3	Pilar Oroño	1 episodes
1997 - 1998	Calle nueva	La 1	Sandra Muñoz	6 episodes
1998	Periodistas	Telecinco	Esther Castro	1 episode
1998 - 1999	A las once en casa	La 1	Elisa Castaño	14 episodes
1999	7 vidas	Telecinco	Úrsula	1 episode
1999	Compañeros	Antena 3	Chus	1 episode
2000 - 2001	Al salir de clase	Telecinco	Cristina Angulo	118 episodes
2003	Cuéntame cómo pasó	La 1	Laura	4 episodes
2004	Los Serrano	Telecinco	Natalie	1 episode
2005	Maneras de sobrevivir	La 1	Merche	13 episodes
2007	Los Serrano	Telecinco	Emilia Huarte	13 episodes
2007 - 2009	Cuestión de sexo	Cuatro	Alba	35 episodes
2013	Vive cantando	Antena 3	Luisa Almagro López	2 episodes
2014	La que se avecina	Telecinco	Clemencia	2 episodes
2015 - 2016	Olmos y Robles	La 1	Isabel Antúnez	18 episodes
2018 - 2020	Vivir sin permiso (Unauthorized Living)	Telecinco	Asunción «Chon» Moliner	20 episodes
2020 - 2021	Señoras del (h)AMPA	Telecinco / Cuatro	Belinda Chamorro	13 episodes
2020	Someone Has to Die	Netflix	Belén Aldama	3 episodes
2021	Premios Feroz	YouTube	Herself-presenter	TV Special
2021	Sin novedad	HBO Max	Elisenda Olivares	6 episodes
2023	Zorras	Atresplayer Premium	Juana	8 episodes
2023	Mentiras pasajeras	SkyShowtime	Maite	8 episodios

=== Short films ===
- Pulp Ration (Ración de pulpo) (1996), by José María Benítez
- Making of 'Atraco' (1997), by Carlos Molinero.
- Cien maneras de hacer el pollo al txilindrón (1997), by Kepa Sojo.
- [Road Movie (1997), by Norberto Ramos del Val.
- No sé, no sé (1998), by Aitor Gaizka.
- Agujetas en el alma (1998), by Fernando Merinero.
- ¿Qué hay de postre? (2000), by Helio Mira.
- Dos más (2001), by Elias Leon Siminiani.
- Looking for Chencho (2002), by Kepa Sojo.
- Test (2007), by Marta Aledo and Natalia Mateo.
- 9 (2010), by Candela Peña.
- El premio (2011), by Elías León Siminiani.

== Accolades ==
Year	Award	Category	Nominee(s)	Result	Ref.
2008	11th Málaga Film Festival	Best Short Film Actress	Test	Won	
2010	24th Goya Awards	Best Supporting Actress	Fat People	Nominated	
2010	19th Actors and Actresses Union Awards	Best Film Actress in a Minor Role	Fat People	Won	
2011	14th Málaga Film Festival	Best Short Film Actress ('Biznaga de Plata')	El premio	Won	
2018	27th Actors and Actresses Union Awards	Best Film Actress in a Minor Role	It's for Your Own Good	Nominated	
2020	7th Feroz Awards	Best Main Actress in a Film	Advantages of Travelling by Train	Nominated	
2020	75th CEC Medals	Best Actress	Advantages of Travelling by Train	Nominated	
