= Emilio Martínez-Lázaro =

Spanish film director

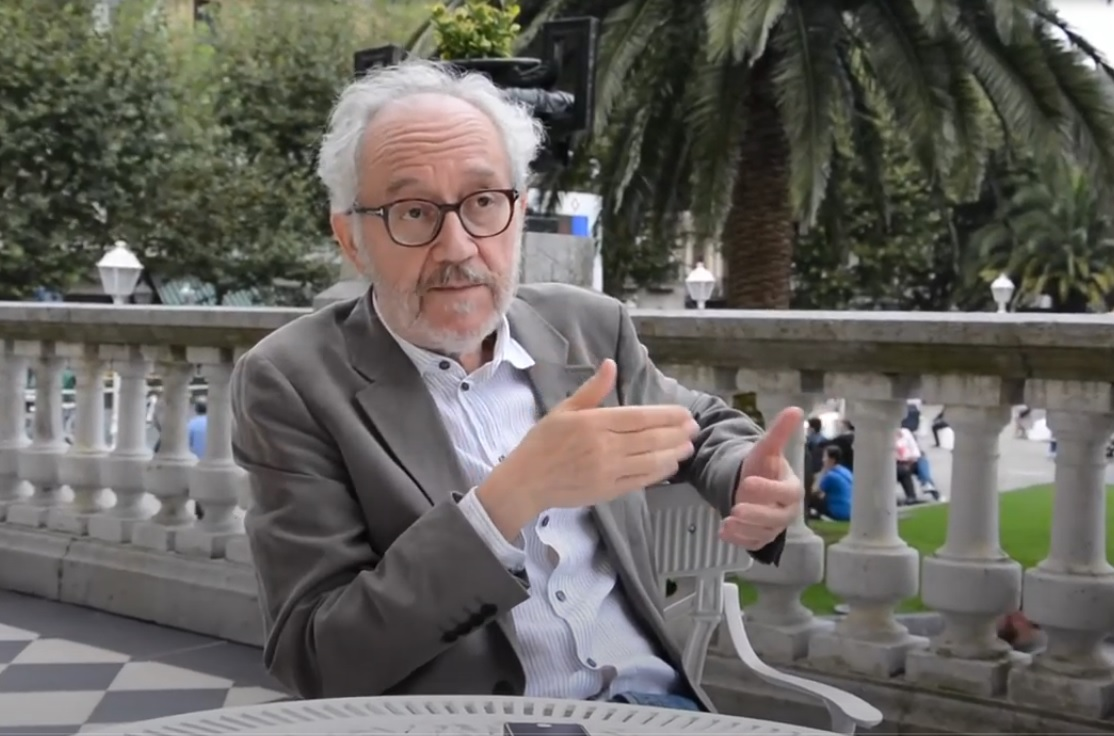
- Born: Emilio Martínez-Lázaro Torre; 1945 (age 80–81); Madrid, Spain
- Occupations: Film director, television director, screenwriter

Emilio Martínez-Lázaro Torre (born 1945) is a Spanish filmmaker known for directing box office hits such as The Other Side of the Bed (2002) and Spanish Affair (2014).

== Biography ==
Emilio Martínez-Lázaro was born in Madrid in 1945. He studied in a Jesuit school and later began studies in Industrial Engineering and then in Physical Sciences in Madrid.

His first association with cinema came when he joined the Escuela de Argüelles, a group of independent filmmakers. He made his first short film, Circunstancias del Milagro/The Circumstances of the Miracle, in 1968; re-edited in 1972 and retitled El Camino del Cielo/The Road to Heaven, it was shown at several international film festivals. He made his first feature, Pastel de Sangre/Blood Cake, in 1971. Martínez-Lázaro entered the television industry in 1974, directing episodes of numerous television series, and since then has continued to work in both venues. His debut as solo feature film director, What Max Said, shared a Golden Bear at the 28th Berlin International Film Festival with García Sánchez's La Trucha/The Trout. In addition to directing, Martínez-Lázaro has established himself as a noted screenwriter.

== Filmography ==
=== Director ===
Short films

- 1969 — Aspavientos
- 1970 — Amo mi cama rica

Feature films

- 1971 — Pastel de sangre (Note: Directed jointly with José María Valle, Francesc Bellmunt and Jaime Chávarri.)
- 1978 — Las palabras de Max (What Max Said)
- 1980 — Sus años dorados
- 1985 — Lulú de noche (Lulu by Night)
- 1988 — El juego más divertido (The Most Amusing Game)
- 1991 — Amo tu cama rica
- 1994 — Los peores años de nuestra vida (The Worst Years of Our Lives)
- 1997 — Carreteras secundarias (Backroads)
- 2001 — La voz de su amo (His Master's Voice)
- 2002 — El otro lado de la cama (The Other Side of the Bed)
- 2005 — Los 2 lados de la cama
- 2007 — Las 13 rosas (13 Roses)
- 2012 — La montaña rusa
- 2014 — Ocho apellidos vascos (Spanish Affair)
- 2015 — Ocho apellidos catalanes (Spanish Affair 2)
- 2018 — Miamor perdido (Mylove Lost)
- 2024 — Un hipster en la España vacía

Television series

- 2021 — Supernormal

=== Actor ===
- The impeccable pecador (1987) by Augusto Martínez Towers

=== Producer ===
- The disaster of Annual (1970) by Frank Ricardo
- Lulu at night (1985) by Emilio Martínez-Lázaro
- The woman of your life 2: The woman duende (1992) by Jaime Chávarri

=== Scriptwriter ===
- Pie of blood (1971) by Francesc Bellmunt
- Pascual Duarte (1976)
- The game more amused (1987) by Emilio Martínez-Lázaro
- Amo your rich bed (1991) by Emilio Martínez-Lázaro
- Like being woman and not to die in the attempt (1991)

== Awards and nominations ==
Year	Award	Category	Work	Result	Ref.
1978	28th Berlin International Film Festival	Golden Bear	What Max Said	Won	
1987	1st Goya Awards	Best Director	Lulu by Night	Nominated	
2003	17th Goya Awards	Best Director	The Other Side of the Bed	Nominated	
2008	22nd Goya Awards	Best Director	13 Roses	Nominated	
