= Amparo Valle =

Spanish actress

- Born: Amparo Valle Vicente; 15 July 1937; Valencia, Spain
- Died: 29 September 2016 (aged 79); Valencia, Spain
- Occupation: Actress
- Years active: 1964–2016
- Spouse: Gerardo Malla
- Children: Coque Malla; Miguel Malla

Amparo Valle Vicente (15 July 1937 – 29 September 2016) was a Spanish actress. She appeared in more than eighty films from 1964 to 2016.

== Biography ==
She was born on 15 July 1937 in Valencia, Spain.

She began her career on stage in a 1959 production of The Crime on Goats Island. Between 1998 and 2002, she appeared in the TV series Periodistas, directed by Alejandro Amenábar, in the role of 'Marta Cuesta', which is closely modelled on Ramón Sampedro statements. In 1999, she appeared in Flores de otro mundo, in the role of 'Gregoria', the mother of the farmer Damián (Luis Tosar).

She was married to theatrical director Gerardo Malla and they have two children: Coque Malla and Miguel Malla. Her last work was La carta, a song composed alongside her son Coque Malla. She died on 29 September 2016, aged 79, of lung cancer in Valencia, Spain.

== Filmography ==
She appeared frequently in films from the 1960s including:

- Maria Rosa (1965)
- Aquel humo gris (1967)
- El certificado (1970)
- Laia (1972)
- Apunte sobre Ana (1973)
- Pim, pam, pum... ¡fuego! (1975)
- The Second Power (1976)
- A Dog Called... Vengeance (1977)
- Trout (1978)
- El canto de la cigarra (1980)
- El pretendiente (1982)
- Extramuros (1985)
- Cain (1987)
- Espérame en el cielo (1988) as Rosa
- El vuelo de la paloma (1989)
- Going Down in Morocco (1989)
- Todo es mentira (1994)
- Perro, ¿qué miras? (1995)
- Flores de otro mundo (1999) as Gregoria
- El figurante (2000)
- Agüela (2001)
- Derecho de admisión (2001)
- Sagitario (2001)
- Diminutos del calario (2001)
- The Lost Steps (2001) as Matilde
- Chicken Skin (2002)
- First and Last Love (2002)
- November (2003) as Alicia
- Imagining Argentina (2003)
- Teresa, Teresa (2003)
- Teresa y Luisa Esmeralda (2003)
- Lo mejor que le puede pasar a un cruasán (2003)
- El horrible crimen ritual de la calle Tribulete (2004)
- Semen, a History of Love (2005)
- Ole! (2005)
- No pasa nada (2006)
- Días de cine (2007)
- Theresa: The Body of Christ (2007)
- Under the Stars (2007) as Tía Encarna
- Nobody's Rose (2011)
- Ramona (2011)
- Viral (2013)
- La buena fe (2014)
- Follow the Instructions (2014)
- El camerino (2016)

She also appeared on television in productions of:

- El camino (1978)
- Brigada Central (1989)
- Farmacia de guardia (1991-1995) as Amparo
- Hermanas (1998) as Hermana Asunción
- Periodistas (1998-2002) as Marta Cuesta, which is closely modelled of Ramón Sampedro statements.
- Don Quixote (2000)
- Hospital central (2000) as Carmen
- Fuera de lugar (2008) as La Dona
- Amar en tiempos revueltos (2009) as Madre Superiora
- Los exitosos Pells (2009) as Josefina Mesa
- Sin identidad (2014) as Micaela
- La que se avecina (2011-2014) as Justi

== Bibliography ==
- Smith, Paul Julian (2009). Spanish Screen Fiction: Between Cinema and Television. Liverpool University Press. p. 200. ISBN 9781846312021.
