= María Esteve =

Spanish actress

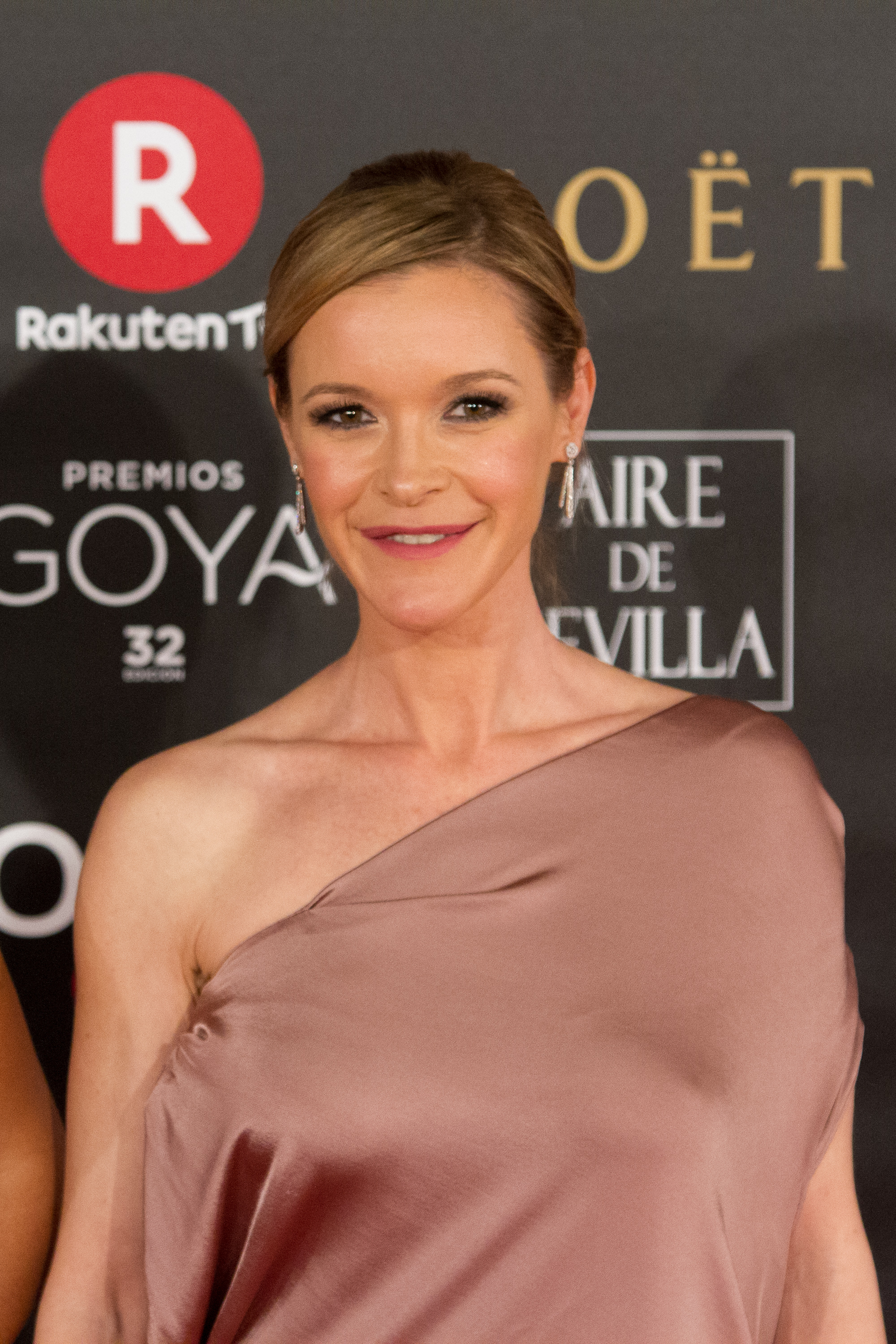
- Esteve at the 32nd Goya Awards in 2018
- Born: María Esteve Flores; 30 December 1974 (age 51); Mar del Plata, Argentina
- Occupation: Actress
- Parents: Antonio Gades (father); Pepa Flores (mother)

María Esteve Flores (born 30 December 1974) is a Spanish actress.

== Biography ==
Esteve was born on 30 December 1974 in Mar del Plata, Argentina. She is the eldest daughter of actress Pepa Flores and dancer Antonio Gades. Her sister is the singer Celia Flores.

Esteve had her film debut in the 1996 film Not Love, Just Frenzy.

She has since appeared in several films, commercials, and TV shows, including the series Doctor Mateo. In 1998, Esteve was nominated for a Goya Award for Best New Actress, for her role in Nothing in the Fridge. She was nominated again for a Goya in 2003, for her supporting role in The Other Side of the Bed.

In July 2011, Esteve married a man who has remained anonymous to the public as of January 2012.

== Filmography ==
Year	Title	Role	Notes	Ref.
1996	Más que amor, frenesí (Not Love, Just Frenzy)			
1997	Nada en la nevera (Nothing in the Fridge)	Carlota		
1998	Mensaka, páginas de una historia (Mensaka)	Natalia		
1999	Cuarteto de La Habana	Vicky		
2000	El arte de morir (The Art of Dying)	Clara		
2001	Hombres felices			
2002	El otro lado de la cama (The Other Side of the Bed)	Pilar		
2003	Días de fútbol (Football Days)	Carla		
2004	El juego de la verdad (The Truth and Other Lies)	Lea		
2005	Los 2 lados de la cama (The 2 Sides of the Bed)	Pilar	Reprise of role in The Other Side of the Bed	
2006	Ratónpolis			
2007	Four Last Songs			
2009	Doctor Mateo (TV)			
