= Andrés Lima (director) =

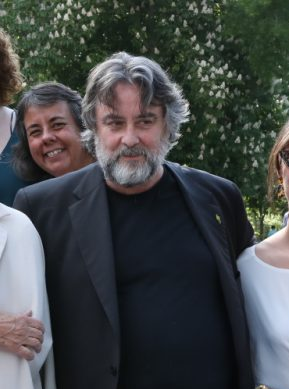
- Lima in 2019
- Born: Andrés Lima Fernández de Toro; 1961 (age 63–64); Madrid, Spain
- Occupations: Theatre director; actor

Andrés Lima Fernández de Toro (born 1961) is a Spanish actor and theatre director. He is linked to the stage company Animalario.

== Life and career ==
Andrés Lima Fernández de Toro was born in Madrid in 1961. He was the founder of the theatre company Riesgo, which later combined with Ración de Oreja to form the seed of the theatre company Animalario.

His stage work includes the following titles: Qué te importa que te ame, El fin de los sueños, Tren de mercancías huyendo hacia el oeste, Pornografía barata, Alejandro y Ana (lo que España no pudo ver del banquete de la boda del presidente), Últimas palabras de Copito de Nieve, Hamelin, Marat-Sade, Argelino, servidor de dos amos, Tito Andrónico, Urtain, Penumbra, El montaplatos, La vuelta de Nora (Casa de muñecas 2), Shock (el cóndor y el puma), El chico de la última fila, Paraíso perdido, and La comedia de los errores.

As an actor, he has featured in films such as Mad Love (2001), Mondays in the Sun (2002), Goya's Ghosts (2006), and Cinema Days (2009).

The Ministry of Culture and Sport awarded him with the 2019 National Theater Prize.

== Accolades ==
Year	Award	Category	Work	Result	Ref.
2006	9th Max Awards	Best Stage Direction	Hamelin	Won	
2008	11th Max Awards	Best Stage Direction	Marat-Sade	Won	
2009	12th Max Awards	Best Stage Direction	Argelino, servidor de dos amos	Won	
2010	13th Max Awards	Best Stage Direction	Urtain	Won	
2020	23th Max Awards	Best Stage Direction	Shock (el cóndor y el puma)	Won	
