= Félix Sabroso =

Spanish screenwriter

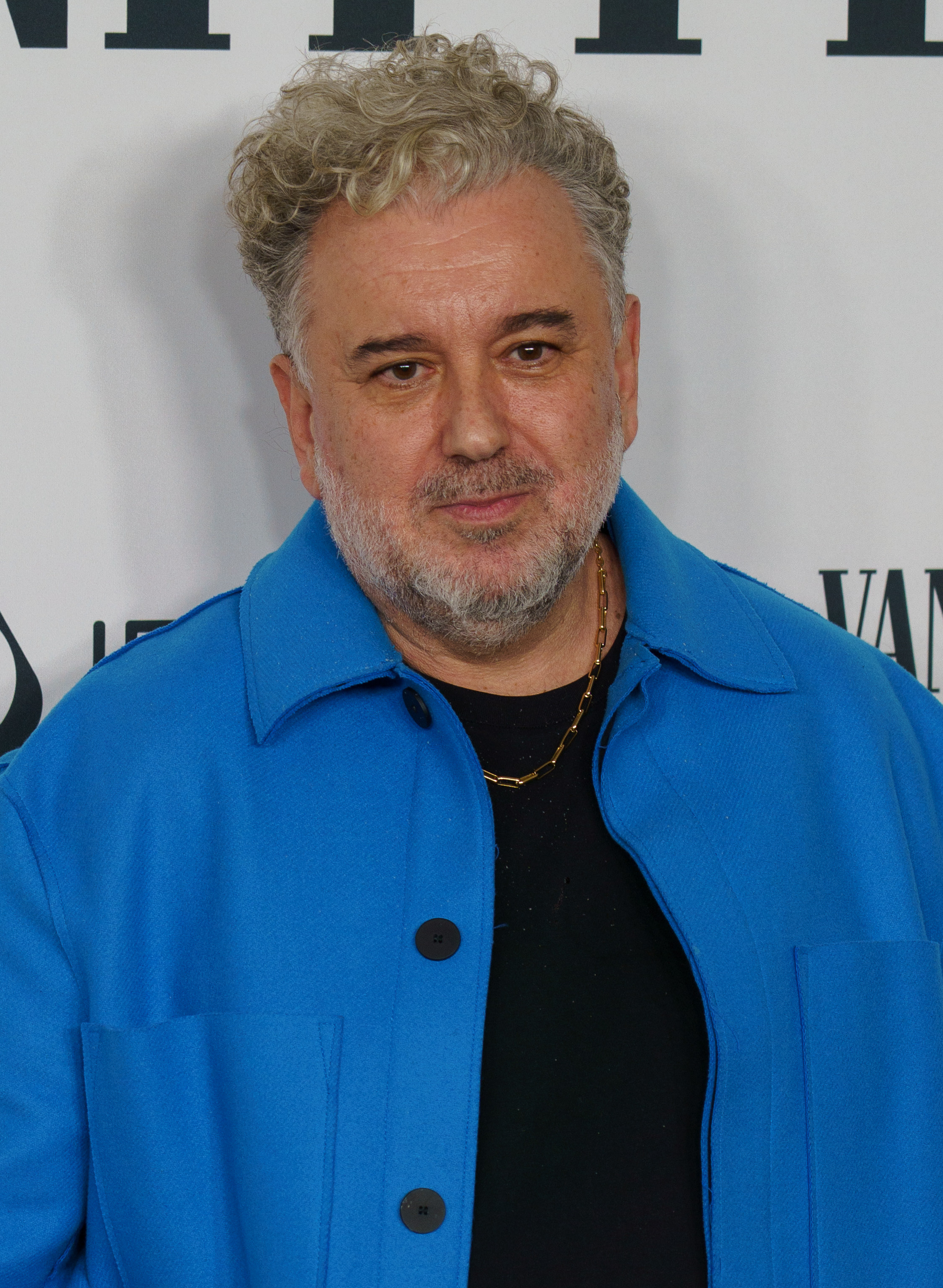
Sabroso in 2025

Félix Sabroso de la Cruz (born 10 August 1965) is a Spanish director and screenwriter from the Canary Islands. For his early career, he worked in a tandem with Dunia Ayaso, who died in 2014.

== Life and career ==
Félix Sabroso de la Cruz was born on 10 August 1965 in Las Palmas de Gran Canaria. He moved to Madrid in 1992 to pursue a filmmaking career with Dunia Ayaso.

Ayaso and Sabroso's first feature was Fea (1994). Their LGBT comedy Excuse Me Darling, but Lucas Loved Me (1997) became a box-office hit. However, their following feature Shoot Out (1998) was a blunder. Following a blank period, they released Chill Out! (2003), Rated R (2008) and The Island Inside (2009). They also created and directed the El Deseo-produced comedy-drama series Mujeres (2006), which received "excellent" reviews in Spain, and penned the screenplay of Juan Flahn's Boystown (2007).

Following the death of his creative collaborator and life partner in February 2014, Sabroso continued working. His first solo feature without Ayaso, El tiempo de los monstruos, was presented at the 2015 Seville European Film Festival. He directed the SkyShowtime comedy-drama series Mentiras pasajeras (2023) and shot comedy film Canta y no llores (2024). He also created and directed Max series Rage (2025).
