= Agustín Almodóvar =

Spanish film producer and actor

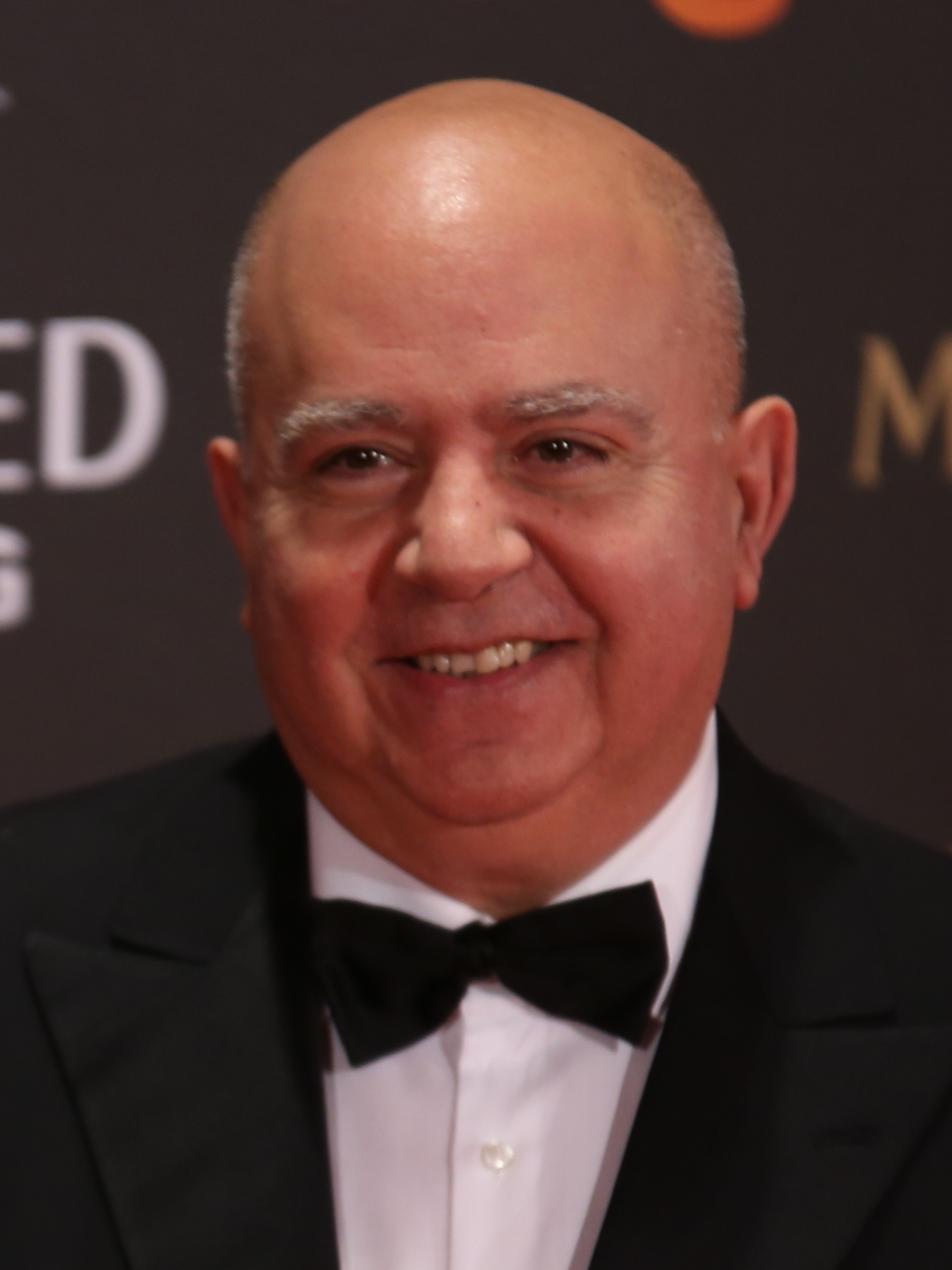
- Born: Agustín Almodóvar Caballero; 25 May 1955 (age 71); Calzada de Calatrava, Ciudad Real, Spain
- Other name: Tinin Almodóvar
- Occupation: film producer

Agustín Almodóvar Caballero (Spanish: [aɣusˈtin almoˈðoβaɾ kaβaˈʎeɾo]; born 25 May 1955) is a film producer and younger brother of filmmaker Pedro Almodóvar. He was born in Calzada de Calatrava and obtained a degree in chemistry from the Complutense University of Madrid. He began his career in film production as a messenger in Fernando Trueba's film Sé infiel y no mires con quién. In 1986, he and Pedro founded their own production company, El Deseo S.A. Through this company he has produced all of Pedro's films since 1986, and several French co-productions. He is a member of the Academy of Cinematographic Arts and Sciences of Spain.

== Filmography ==
- 1986: Matador, director: Pedro Almodóvar.
- 1987: La ley del deseo, director: Pedro Almodóvar.
- 1988: Mujeres al borde de un ataque de nervios, director: Pedro Almodóvar.
- 1989: ¡Átame!, director: Pedro Almodóvar.
- 1991: Tacones lejanos, director: Pedro Almodóvar.
- 1991: Terra fría, director: Antonio Campos.
- 1992: Acción mutante, director: Álex de la Iglesia.
- 1993: Kika, director: Pedro Almodóvar.
- 1995: Tengo una casa, directora: Mónica Laguna.
- 1995: La flor de mi secreto, director: Pedro Almodóvar.
- 1996: Pasajes, director: Daniel Calparsoro.
- 1997: Carne trémula, director: Pedro Almodóvar.
- 1998: A trabajar, director: Alain Guesnier.
- 1999: Todo sobre mi madre, director: Pedro Almodóvar.
- 2001: La fiebre del loco, director: Andrés Wood.
- 2001: El espinazo del diablo, director: Guillermo del Toro.
- 2002: Hable con ella. director: Pedro Almodóvar.
- 2003: Mi vida sin mí, directora: Isabel Coixet.
- 2004: Descongélate!, directores: Félix Sabroso y Dunia Ayaso.
- 2004: La mala educación, director: Pedro Almodóvar.
- 2005: La vida secreta de las palabras, directora: Isabel Coixet.
- 2006: Volver, director: Pedro Almodóvar.
- 2007: Cobrador. In God we trust, director: Paul Leduc.
- 2008: La mujer rubia, directora: Lucrecia Martel.
- 2009: El patio de mi cárcel, directora: Belén Macías.
- 2010: Los abrazos rotos, director: Pedro Almodóvar.
- 2010: El último verano de la Boyita, directora: Julia Solomonoff.
- 2011: La piel que habito, director: Pedro Almodóvar.
- 2013: Los amantes pasajeros, director: Pedro Almodóvar.
- 2014: Relatos salvajes, director Damián Szifron.
- 2016: Julieta, director: Pedro Almodóvar.
- 2019: Dolor y gloria, director: Pedro Almodóvar
- 2020: The Human Voice director: Pedro Almodóvar
- 2020: It Snows in Benidorm director: Isabel Coixet
- 2024: The Room Next Door, director: Pedro Almodóvar
- 2025: Sirāt, director: Óliver Laxe
- 2026: Bitter Christmas, director: Pedro Almodóvar

=== Documentary ===
- 2003: Eyengui, dios del sueño, director: José Manuel Novoa.
- 2004: César y Zain, director: Lorenzo J. Levene.
- 2004 Caravan, mercaderes de la sal, director: Gerardo Olivares.
- 2004: Los sin tierra, director: Miguel Barros.
- 2008: Historias de las montañas de la bruma, director: Larry Levene.
- 2009: El señor de Sipán, director: José Manuel Novoa.
- 2010: José y Pilar, director: Miguel Gonçalves Mendes.
- 2012: The Labeque way, director: Félix Cábez.
- 2013: Con la pata quebrada, director: Diego Galán.
