= María Pujalte =

Spanish actress

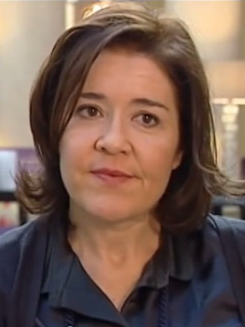
- Pujalte in 2013
- Born: María Pujalte Vidal; 22 December 1966 (age 59); Corunna, Spain
- Occupation: Actress

María Pujalte Vidal (born 22 December 1966, in A Coruña) is a Spanish actress.

She studied singing, drama and self-expression through movement in Santiago de Compostela and at the Scuola Internazionale dell'Attore Comico from Reggio Emilia with a scholarship of the Deputation of Corunna.

She has been a member of Centro Dramático Galego and of the theatre groups Moucho Clerc and Compañía de Marías.

== Filmography ==
Year	Title	Role	Director
1989	Sempre Xonxa	(uncredited)	Chano Piñeiro
1991	Martes de carnaval	Alba	Pedro Carvajal
1994	El baile de las ánimas	Malena	Pedro Carvajal
1995	Entre rojas	Cata	Azucena Rodríguez
1996	Libertarias	Mariona	Vicente Aranda
1997	Perdona bonita, pero Lucas me quería a mí	Maricarmen	Dunia Ayaso and Félix Sabroso
1998	Insomnio	Isabel	Chus Gutiérrez
1998	El grito en el cielo	Rita	Dunia Ayaso and Félix Sabroso
1999	Los lobos de Washington	Sara	Mariano Barroso
1999	La Parrilla	Mamen Taber	Xavier Manich
2002	A mi madre le gustan las mujeres	Jimena	Daniela Fejerman and Inés París
2003	El lápiz del carpintero	Beatriz	Antón Reixa
2003	En la ciudad	Sofia	Dunia Ayaso and Félix Sabroso
2003	Descongélate!	Invitada Fiesta	Dunia Ayaso and Félix Sabroso
2004	Cosas que hacen que la vida valga la pena	Angeles	Manuel Gómez Pereira
2005	Semen, una historia de amor	Gloria	Daniela Fejerman and Inés París
2008	Rivales	Maria	Fernando Colomo
2010	Que se mueran los feos	Begonia	Nacho G. Velilla
2016	La noche que mi madre mató a mi padre	Susana	Inés París

=== Short films ===
Year	Title	Role	Director
1991	Macana de dote, che		Miguel Castelo
1994	As xoias da Señora Bianconero		Jorge Coira
1995	La boutique del llanto	Candida	Iñaki Peñafiel
1995	Gran liquidacion	Cega	Jorge Coira
1996	Interferencias		Antonio Morales Pérez
1997	Completo comfort	Miranda	Juan Flahn
1997	¿A mí quién me manda meterme en esto?	Maite	Daniela Fejerman and Inés París
1999	Vamos a dejarlo		Daniela Fejerman and Inés París
2006	El regalo	Puri	Carlos Agulló

== Television ==
=== As a conductor ===
- Gala Premios Max, 2003

=== As an actress ===
Year/s	Title	Role
1997	'Los negocios de mamá'	Lucrecia
1998-2001	Periodistas	Memen Tebar
2004-2006	Siete Vidas	Monica Olmedo
2009-2014	Los misterios de Laura	Laura Lebrel del Bosque
2011	Los Quién	Susana Zunzunegui
2019	Vota Juan	Macerena Lombardo
2019	Toy Boy	Carmen de Andres
2019	Merlí: Sapere Aude	Maria Bolano
2020	Vamos Juan	Macerena Lombardo
2021	Venga Juan	Macerena Lombardo

== Theatre ==
- The Real Thing (2010), by Tom Stoppard.
- Gatas (2008), by Manuel González Gil and Daniel Botti.
- Las cuñadas (2008), by Michel Tremblay.
- El método Grönholm (2007), by Jordi Galcerán
- Dónde pongo la cabeza (2006), by Yolanda García Serrano
- Confesiones de mujeres de 30 (2002-2004)
- Caníbales (1996)
- Martes de Carnaval (1995) by Ramón del Valle-Inclán
- Finisterra Broadway amén y squasch (1993)
- O Roixinol de Bretaña (1991) by Quico Cadaval
- Yerma (1990) by Federico García Lorca
- O Códice Clandestino (1989), by Quico Cadaval
- O Mozo que chegou de lonxe (1989)

== Awards ==
- Unión de Actores, Best New Actress with Entre rojas, 1995
- Unión de Actores, Best Actress in a Supporting role with Periodistas, 2000
- Premios Teatro de Rojas, Best Actress with El método Grönholm, 2007
- Festival de Cans, Pedigree Honor Award, 2011
