= The Last Summer of La Boyita =

2009 film by Julia Solomonoff

- Spanish: El último verano de la Boyita
- Directed by: Julia Solomonoff
- Written by: Julia Solomonoff
- Based on: An autobiographical account by the director
- Produced by: Agustín Almodóvar; Pedro Almodóvar
- Starring: Guadalupe Alonso; Gabo Correa; María Clara Merendino; Mirella Pascual; Guillermo Pfening; Sylvia Tavcar; Arnoldo Treise; Nicolás Treise
- Cinematography: Lucio Bonelli; Julia Solomonoff
- Edited by: Rosario Suárez; Andrés Tambornino
- Music by: Sebastián Escofet
- Production companies: Travesia Productions; Domenica Films; El Deseo; Epicentre Films
- Release date: 5 November 2009 (Argentina)
- Running time: 93 minutes
- Countries: Argentina; Spain; France
- Language: Spanish
- Box office: $21,237

The Last Summer of La Boyita (Spanish: El último verano de la Boyita) is a 2009 Argentine drama film with LGBT+ themes, written and directed by Julia Solomonoff. It tells the story of an intersex person entering adolescence. The film received multiple awards at the Cartagena, Ceará, Kerala, Miami, and Sofia festivals.

== Plot ==
Jorgelina is a girl entering adolescence, awakening questions, insecurities, and fears. She has an older sister who has already gone through this stage, now focused on boys and no longer spending time with her. Jorgelina decides to spend the summer at her family’s countryside property in Entre Ríos, where La Boyita (the Fishing buoy), an old trailer that has been her refuge and the setting for her childhood games and fantasies, is located.

In the countryside, she expects to reunite with Mario, the child of one of the farmworkers who also helps with rural tasks, and who has been her friend since childhood. Mario is also entering adolescence and is the subject of a conspicuous silence among the adults, who vaguely refer to "the matter." As they grow and transition into adolescence, Mario does not fit the expectations of the male gender they were assigned at birth, causing anger and shame in their father.

Jorgelina draws closer to them, offering companionship and support. To her, Mario is not a clinical case, and whenever they are described as such, she covers her ears. During that summer, Jorgelina and Mario will face their respective bodies without prejudices or stereotypes.

== Cast ==
- Guadalupe Alonso as Jorgelina
- Nicolás Treise as Mario
- Gabo Correa as Eduardo, Jorgelina's father
- María Clara Merendino as Luciana, Jorgelina's sister
- Mirella Pascual as Elba, Mario's mother
- Guillermo Pfening as Héctor
- Sylvia Tavcar as Silvia
- Arnoldo Treise as Oscar, Mario's father
