= Alonso Caparrós =

Spanish television presenter

- Born: Alonso Caparrós Araújo; 24 November 1970 (age 55); Madrid, Spain
- Occupations: Television presenter and actor
- Years active: 1991–present
- Employers: TVE; (1991–1998); Antena3; (1998–2005); Onda 6; (2005); Córdoba Internacional TV; (2007–2014); Intereconomía TV; (2014–2017); Telecinco; (2017–present)

Alonso Caparrós Araújo (Madrid, Spain, 24 November 1970) is a television presenter and actor.

== Biography ==
Son of the Almeria journalist Andrés Caparrós, and brother of the also TV presenter Andrés Caparrós, his first opportunity to get in front of the cameras came when he was only 20 years old, when María Teresa Campos offered him to collaborate in his morning magazine Pasa la vida (1991–1996), of TVE.

With that background behind him, he had the opportunity to make his film debut, playing the role of the handsome Lucas, with whom three homosexuals played by Jordi Mollà, Pepón Nieto and Roberto Correcher in the film Perdona bonita, pero Lucas me quería a mí (1997), by Félix Sabroso. A year later, he participated in his last film to date: La mirada del otro (1998), by Vicente Aranda, an adaptation of the novel of the same name by Fernando G. Delgado. Alonso ends the year with the short film: Rondadores Nocturnos 3 (1998), by Aure Roces.

In 1997 he was signed by Antena 3 where he presented the contest Furor (1998–2001), and then replaced Bertín Osborne in Menudas estrellas (2002). Later works were presentation from the set of the first season of the reality show La isla de los famosos (2003) or the space Factor Miedo (2004).

She later participated as a contestant in La Granja (2004) and ¡Mira quién baila! (2005). After working for Telemadrid in a new edition of Furor and participating in the series La dársena de poniente (2006), since January 2007 he has been working in the local channel of Madrid Onda 6, where he presents the program ¡Oh la la!, in place of Víctor Sandoval.

During 2013 and 2014 he worked at the television channel Córdoba Internacional, as a presenter. On 30 October 2014, it is announced that he signs with Intereconomía to head the renewed sports talk show Punto pelota.

On 28 December 2016, it is confirmed through Sálvame his participation in the fifth edition of GH VIP, along with other media faces, and which began airing in January 2017 being the third expelled after 25 days of competition.

On 25 March 2017, he begins to collaborate in Deluxe and, months later, in Sálvame. In 2020 he collaborates as a diner in La última cena.

== Trajectory ==
=== Television presenter ===
Television programs
| Year | Title | Channel | Role |
|---|---|---|---|
| 1997 | Maridos y mujeres | TVE | Host |
| 1997–1998 | Vídeos de primera | TVE | Host |
| 1997–1998 | Música sí | TVE | Host |
| 1998–2006 | Furor | Antena 3 and Telemadrid | Host |
| 2000 | "Aventúrate Tv” | Antena 3 | Host |
| 2000 | ¿Quién dijo miedo? | Antena 3 | Host |
| 2001 | Fugitivos en la ciudad | Antena 3 | Host |
| 2002 | Menudas estrellas | Antena 3 | Host |
| 2003 | La isla de los famosos | Antena 3 | Host |
| 2005 | Factor miedo | Antena 3 | Host |
| 2007–2009 | ¡Oh la la! | Onda 6 | Host |
| 2013–2014 | Camino hacia la umbrah | Córdoba Internacional TV | Host |
| 2014–2017 | Punto pelota | Intereconomía | Host |
| 2019–present | Sálvame | Telecinco | Contributor |

=== Television collaborator ===
Contributor
| Year | Title | Channel | Role |
|---|---|---|---|
| 1991–1996 | Pasa la vida | TVE | Contributor |
| 2005–2007 | Channel nº 4 | Cuatro | Contributor |
| 2017 | Mad in Spain | Telecinco | Contributor |
| 2017–2018 | Sálvame Stars | Telecinco | Contributor |
| 2017–present | Sálvame | Telecinco | Contributor |
| 2017–present | Deluxe | Telecinco | Contributor |
| 2020–present | El debate de las tentaciones | Telecinco | Contributor |
| 2021 | Rocío, contar la verdad para seguir viva | Telecinco | Contributor |

=== Guest ===
Guest
| Year | Program | Channel | Result |
|---|---|---|---|
| 2017 | Viva la Vida | Telecinco | Guest |
| 2020 | Aquí hay madroño | Telemadrid | Guest |
| 2021 | Sobreviviré | Mitele Plus | Guest |

=== Reality shows and contests ===
Reality shows and contests
| Year | Program | Channel | Result |
|---|---|---|---|
| 2004 | La granja | Antena 3 | 5th expelled |
| 2005 | ¡Mira quién baila! | La 1 | 3rd expelled |
| 2017 | Gran Hermano VIP 5 | Telecinco | 3rd expelled |
| 2018 | Ven a cenar conmigo: Summer Edition | Cuatro | Last qualified |
| 2020 | La última cena | Telecinco | 3rd finalist |

=== Television series ===
Television series
| Year | Title | Character | Channel | Participation |
|---|---|---|---|---|
| 1997 | En plena forma | Alonso | Antena 3 | 6 episodes |
| 2001 | Esencia de poder | Julián Morales | Telecinco | 2 episodes |
| 2004–2005 | Mis adorables vecinos | Host | Antena 3 | 3 episodes |
| 2006 | La Dársena de Poniente | Álvaro Pardo | TVE | 5 episodes |

=== Films ===
Films
| Year | Title | Character | Role |
|---|---|---|---|
| 1997 | Perdona bonita pero Lucas me quería a mí | Lucas | Main role |
| 1998 | La mirada del otro | Luciano | Secondary role |
