= Rage (2025 TV series) =

2025 Spanish TV series

- Promotional release poster
- Spanish: Furia
- Created by: Félix Sabroso
- Directed by: Félix Sabroso; Jau Fornés
- Starring: Carmen Machi; Nathalie Poza; Candela Peña; Pilar Castro; Cecilia Roth
- Music by: Aitor Etxebarria
- Country of origin: Spain
- Original language: Spanish
- No. of seasons: 2
- No. of episodes: 16

Production
- Executive producers: Alberto Carullo; Antonio Trashorras; David Ocaña; José María Caro; Santi Botello; Tedy Villalba Jr.
- Cinematography: Carlos Cebrián
- Production company: Producciones Mandarina

Original release
- Network: HBO Max
- Release: 11 July 2025 – present

Rage (Spanish: Furia) is a Spanish black comedy television series created by Félix Sabroso. It stars Carmen Machi, Nathalie Poza, Candela Peña, Pilar Castro, and Cecilia Roth. It debuted on HBO Max on 11 July 2025.

== Plot ==
The plot follows five middle aged women reaching their limits in the face of injustice.

== Cast ==
- Carmen Machi as Marga
- Nathalie Poza as Adela
- Candela Peña as Nat
- Pilar Castro as Vera
- Cecilia Roth as Victoria
- Claudia Salas as Tina
- Alberto San Juan as Roberto
- Pedro Casablanc as Emilio Durán
- Ana Torrent as Rosa
- Iván Pellicer as Marcel
- Mima Riera as Megan
- Claudia Roset as Lu
- Marilú Marini as Pilar
- Francesc Garrido as Borja
- Martxelo Rubio as Raúl
- Antonio Pagudo as Miguel
- Pepón Nieto as Seve

Introduced in season 2

- Carmen Maura
- María León
- Ana Mena
- Maribel Verdú
- Cecilia Suárez
- Clara Sans

== Production ==
Rage was created by Félix Sabroso, who described the series as "a kind of anthology of my view of reality and it has turned out to be polyhedral, because I wanted to tell many things". The series is a Producciones Mandarina production for HBO Max.

In January 2026, following a previous announcement concerning the renewal of the series for a second season, HBO Max disclosed cast additions Carmen Maura, María León, Ana Mena, Maribel Verdú, Cecilia Suárez, and Clara Sans, while Claudia Salas and Ana Torrent were reported to return.

== Release ==
The first two episodes were released on HBO Max on 11 July 2025.

== Episodes ==
=== Season 1 (2025) ===
1. Marga y Tina
2. Nat
3. Vera
4. Adela
5. Victoria
6. Megan y Lu
7. ¿Familia?
8. Esperanzas

== Reception ==
Alfonso Rivera of Cineuropa declared the series "an explosive party, a riotous blend of black humour as bitter as bile", otherwise finding connections to Women on the Verge of a Nervous Breakdown, Desperate Housewives, Wild Tales, Kill Bill, Carrie, and Falling Down.

Tim Lowery of The AV Club stressed the series as a "very cinematic work", also lauding how Sabroso "smartly avoids" "broad strokes without ever watering down the mischief, fun, brightness, and excellently scored energy" making Rage worth watching.

Margaret Lyons of The New York Times wrote that "while the characters are motivated by pain, the show itself is bright and funny, colorful and surprising".

Álvaro Onieva of Fotogramas rated Rage 5 out of 5 stars, assessing that Sabroso delivers "a funny black comedy with good pacing, and very well executed from an aesthetical standpoint, but which does not lose sight of the depth of its characters and, with them, various neuroses common in our society".

== Accolades ==
Year	Award	Category	Nominee(s)	Result	Ref.
2025	72nd Ondas Awards	Best Actress	Female cast of Rage (Carmen Machi, Candela Peña, Pilar Castro, Nathalie Poza, Ana Torrent, Cecilia Roth, Claudia Salas)	Won	
2025	31st Forqué Awards	Best Actress in a Series	Candela Peña	Nominated	
2026	13th Feroz Awards	Best Comedy Series		Nominated	
2026	13th Feroz Awards	Best Main Actress in a Series	Candela Peña	Nominated	
2026	13th Feroz Awards	Best Screenplay in a Series	Félix Sabroso, Juan Flahn	Nominated	
2026	34th Actors and Actresses Union Awards	Best Television Actress in a Secondary Role	Candela Peña	Nominated	

== See also ==
- 2025 in Spanish television
