= Miguel Gonçalves Mendes =

Portuguese film director (born 1978)

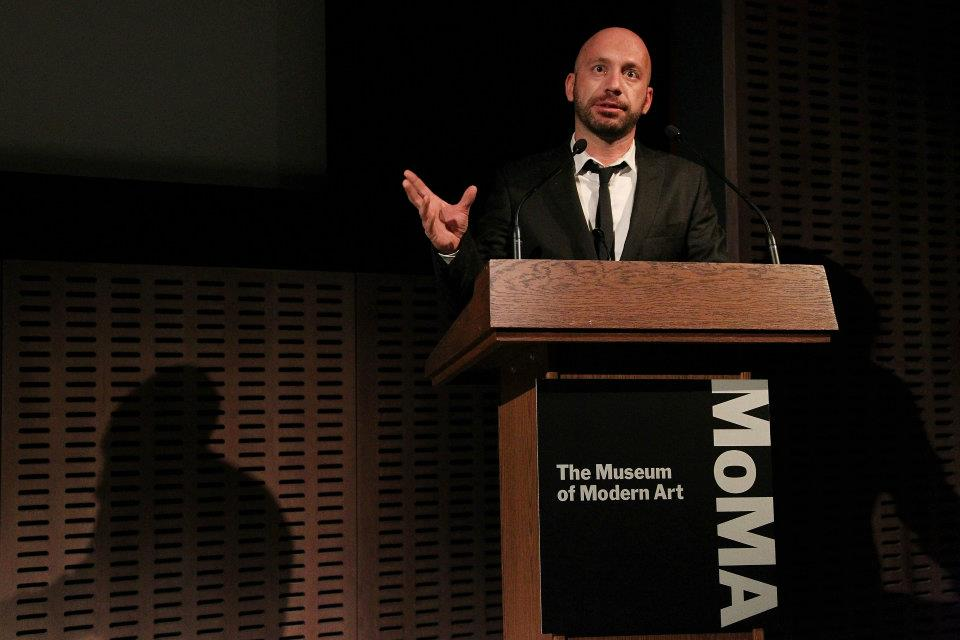
- Miguel Mendes presents "José and Pilar" in the MoMA in 2011.
- Born: September 2, 1978 (age 47); Covilhã, Portugal
- Occupations: Film Director, Screenwriter, Film Producer
- Years active: 2004–present
- Website: mgm.org.pt

Miguel Gonçalves Mendes (born September 2, 1978 in Covilhã) is a Portuguese film director, screenwriter and producer. He is the author of José and Pilar (2010), a documentary about writer and Nobel Prize winner José Saramago, co-produced by Pedro Almodóvar (Talk to Her, The Skin I Live In) and his brother Agustín, and Fernando Meirelles (City of God and The Constant Gardener). In 2011, after a successful international festival circuit, the movie spurred an unprecedented popular movement in Portugal resulting on a petition signed by 1400 people (0.00014% of Portugal's population), which in turn sparked a debate over Portuguese cinema and a campaign for the Oscar nominations in Los Angeles and New York. Currently, Miguel is at the post-production stage of his new documentary, The Meaning of Life, produced by Fernando Meirelles, which has been dealing with issues to raise finishing funds.

== Biography ==
Miguel studied International Relationships (ISCSP – Technical University of Lisbon) and History – Archaeology (New University of Lisbon) before graduating in Film by the Lisbon Theatre and Film School, specializing in Film Editing. In 2002, he founded JumpCut, through which he produced all his projects until 2014.

== Career ==
First years

D. Nieves (2002)

Documentary that explores the proximity between Portugal and Galicia, its historical roots, its deepest reasons and its consequences. This documentary led the director to win the first prizes of his career, such as the "Massimo Troisi" European Prize, in Italy.

Autograph (2004) Documentary that portrays the life, the journey and the individuality of the Portuguese poet and painter Mário Cesariny. It was the winner of the award for Best Portuguese Documentary at DocLisboa 2004.

A Batalha dos Três Reis (2005) The first fiction feature film by Miguel Gonçalves, shot in Morocco, a first long-length fiction film by Miguel Mendes, shot in Morocco, an insane and fatal game of jealousy.

Floripes (2007) Back in documentary cinema, explore the legend of Floripes. An enchanted Moura that wanders, every night, sad and without destiny, through the town of Olhão, enchanting the fishermen with a spell that guided them out to sea, until death.

Silêncio Course (2007) Experimental film, based on the universe of the Experimental Film and on the images of Maria Gabriela Llansol who, following her narrative construction process, explores the so-called “glow dinner”.

== José and Pilar (2010) ==
A documentary that observes the life of one of the greatest writers of the 20th century and finds an unknown Saramago, proving that genius and simplicity are compatible. The Elephant's Journey, the book that narrates the adventures and misadventures of a pachyderm transported from John III of Portugal's court to that of the Austrian Archduke Maximilian, is the departing point of a movie that portrays the relationship between Nobel Prize winner José Saramago and his wife Pilar del Rio. For four years, Miguel spent the days with the couple, at home and during work trips all over the world, revealing a surprising new side of the author, immersed in his creative process while wanting to change the world with his wife – or, at least, to make it a better place. After it became Miguel Mendes’s most popular work, with commercial exhibitions in Portugal, Spain, Brasil, México and Italy and several awards and nominations, the movie stood out for the uncommon support it received from the Portuguese audience and for the debate it ignited around Portuguese cinema, historically divorced from the Portuguese people. The film ended up being picked as Portugal’s candidate for the nomination to Best Foreign Film in the Oscars. It got a run in the United States, which included an exhibition in the MoMA, collected praise from publications like Variety and The New York Times, and got shortlisted for Best Original Song at the Oscars with Já Não Estar (written by José Mário Branco and interpreted by Camané). Brazilian director José Padilha (RoboCop) said that "it's really hard to make a movie like José and Pilar, delicate, respectful, deep. A great movie about a great man and a great woman, about time and death, about love and life."

== I Have Nothing of My Own (2012) ==
Miguel and Brazilian writers Tatiana Salem Levy and João Paulo Cuenca travelled to the Far East for a sharing of experiences with artists and thinkers from Macau, Hong Kong, Vietnam, Cambodia and Thailand. The project I Have Nothing of My Own was born from it. It is described by the authors as “a blend between a travel diary and fiction” and was distributed as a web series. However, as the series progresses, the intended veracity of the diary quickly morphs into a full-blown original fictional narrative that won’t allow the viewer to know what is real anymore. A sort of visual poem that questions the Portuguese cultural identity as it clashes against another culture – which, in the particular case of Macau, was previously contaminated by the culture it clashes against. An example of a cultural encounter and an identity’s reconstruction, in a world where all civilizations were built over the ruins of each other. Known for his alternative distribution methods, Miguel made the whole series available online for free.

== The Meaning of Life (TBA) ==
Miguel’s ongoing film project, produced by O2 Filmes and El Deseo, is being shot around the world since 2013 and is “a complex project due to its scale and the number of characters involved”. The director intends to take the work he developed in José and Pilar, where he captures reality and reworks it through a classical narrative lens, to new heights.

The protagonist is Giovane Brisotto, a young Brazilian man, bearer of a rare incurable disease of Portuguese origins, spread throughout the globe 500 years ago, during the Discoveries. Waiting for a transplant, Giovane decides to embark on a trip around the world, tracing the route of the first Portuguese expedition that spread the disease. During the trip, the protagonist contacts, through media (TV, cinema, advertising, etc.) with seven public figures, seven archetypes, seen as the new heroes of contemporaneity. But it is the viewer who, in parallel narratives, gains privileged access to the private and quotidian universe of each one of them, discovering what’s behind their personas, followed and idolized by millions who search for a reference for their lives. The discovery, says Miguel, has to do with “an important composition: the relationship between death, creation, power, movement and the universe."

== Monograph and Publications ==
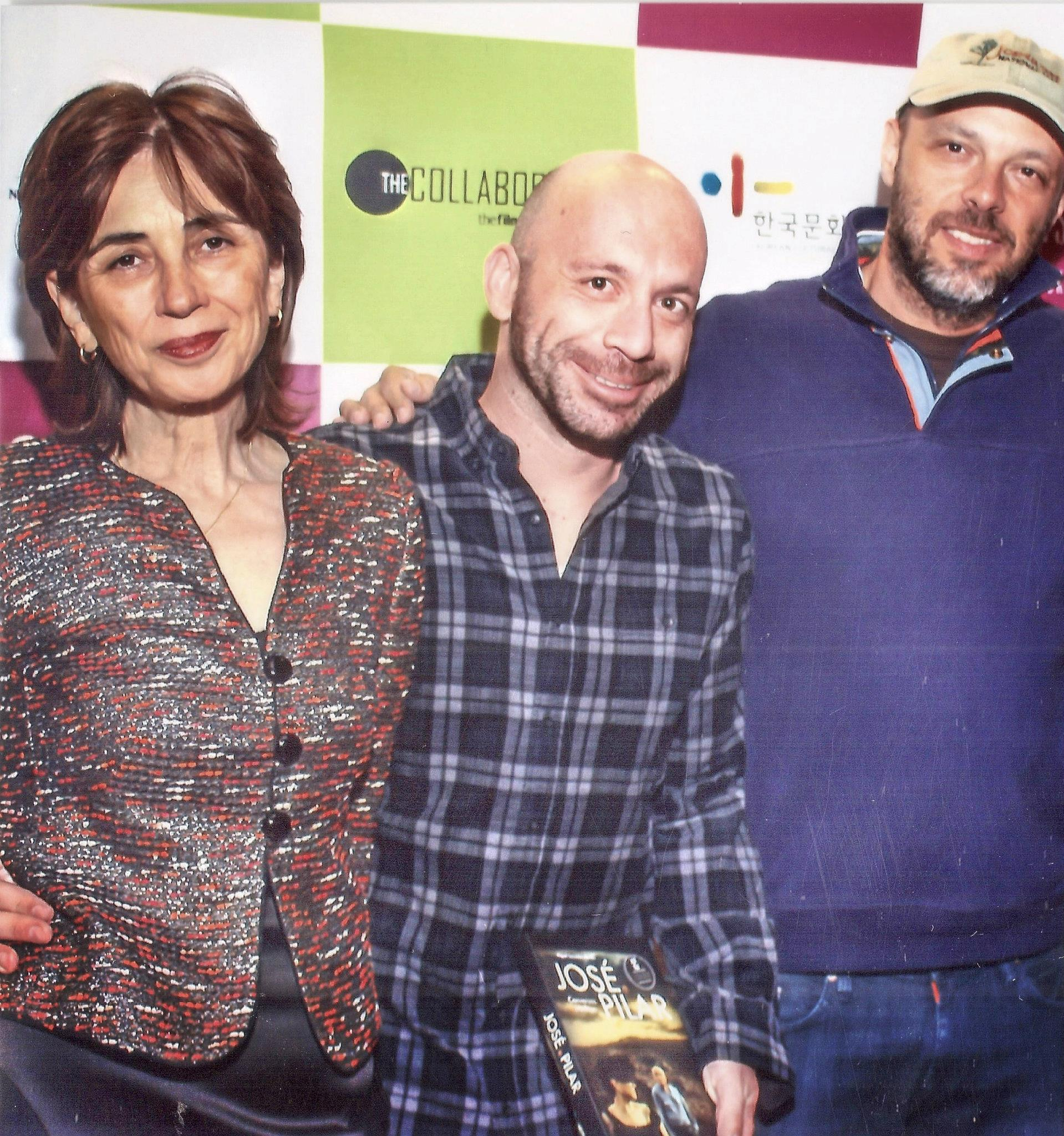
Pilar, Miguel, and José Padilha at the Palm Springs International Film Festival in 2011.

Autography Verse / Mário Cesariny (2007)

Edited by Assírio & Alvim. Complement to the documentary Autography, with unrevealed interviews.

José and Pilar – Unrevealed Conversations (2012)

Edited by Quetzal and Companhia das Letras. Complement to the documentary José and Pilar, with exclusive extras not featuring in the movie. With preface by Valter Hugo Mãe. Published in Portugal, México, Argentina, Uruguai and Spain.

The Films of Miguel Gonçalves Mendes (2012)

Composed from essays by José Padilha, João Moreira, Valter Hugo Mãe, Luís Sepúlveda, Gonçalo M. Tavares, Maria João Seixas, Baltasar Garzón, among others.

The Gospel According to Jesus Christ (TBA) Miguel announced that he has already planned another project, which will be the film adaptation of the controversial and world-acclaimed work of Saramago O Evangelho Segundo Jesus Cristo. At its launch the book was publicly condemned and criticized by the Portuguese government of the time, Prime Minister Cavaco Silva, leading the writer to leave the country to go to the island of Lanzarote in Spain, from where he did not return. The book satirizes the life and death of Jesus Christ by rejecting the treatment of characters according to dogma and myth, portraying them as normal people, with conflicts and emotions of a genuine human being.
