= Nobody's Watching (film) =

2017 drama film

- Release poster (Épicentre Films)
- Nadie nos mira
- Directed by: Julia Solomonoff
- Written by: Julia Solomonoff; Christina Lazaridi
- Produced by: Isabel Coixet; Lúcia Murat; Elisa Lleras
- Starring: Guillermo Pfening; Elena Roger
- Cinematography: Pablo Barbieri Carrera; Karen Sztajnberg; Andrés Tambornino
- Music by: Sacha Amback
- Distributed by: FiGa Films; Épicentre Films; Vudu
- Release date: 2017
- Running time: 102 minutes
- Countries: Argentina; Brazil; Colombia; United States
- Languages: Spanish; English; Portuguese

Nobody's Watching (Spanish: Nadie nos mira) is a 2017 drama film written by Julia Solomonoff and Christina Lazaridi, and directed by Solomonoff. It was internationally co-produced in Argentina, Brazil, Colombia, and the United States.

== Synopsis ==
Nico (Guillermo Pfening) is an actor in Argentina who decides to immigrate to the United States seeking to heal past romantic wounds. He settles in New York City, unable to work as an actor because he does not fit the stereotype of a "Hispanic actor" due to being white and blond-haired. As a result, he ends up babysitting his friend Andrea's (Elena Roger) baby daughter. Nico befriends other (female) babysitters at a local park in Manhattan who help him learn better ways of caring for the girl. He takes other jobs as a parties' barman, interacting only with other Latinos due to his inability to speak any English. Nico, an openly gay man, builds a relationship with Martín (Rafael Ferro) as he struggles to find a purpose to his life.

== Cast ==
- Guillermo Pfening as Nico Lencke
- Elena Roger as Andrea
- Paola Baldion as Viviana
- Rafael Ferro as Martín
- Marco Antonio Caponi as Pablo
- Nadja Settel as Aupair
- Petra Costa as Petra
- Mirella Pascual as Nico's mother
- Michael Patrick Nicholson as Doctor

== Reception and analysis ==
On Rotten Tomatoes, the film holds an approval rating of 88% based on 17 reviews, with an average rating of 3.5/5.0.

The Spanish radio station Los 40 said that the movie represents the dream of many actors around the world who aspire to work along big stars in Hollywood without taking consideration of how hard it is to immigrate to the United States and reach success as an actor. The website added that the movie "arrived in time" to vindicate Pride Month and the human rights of migrants, especially during the context of the first presidency of Donald Trump and his government's migratory policies.

Colombian TV channel Señal Colombia gave a positive review of the film, praising Pfening's performance.

== Accolades ==
Group	Award	Result	Ref
Tribeca Festival	Best Actor in a Narrative Feature Film (Guillermo Pfening)	Won	
Ibero-American Cinema Festival of Ceará, Brazil	Best Ibero-American film	Won	
