= Roberta Marrero =

Spanish artist, singer and actress (1972–2024)

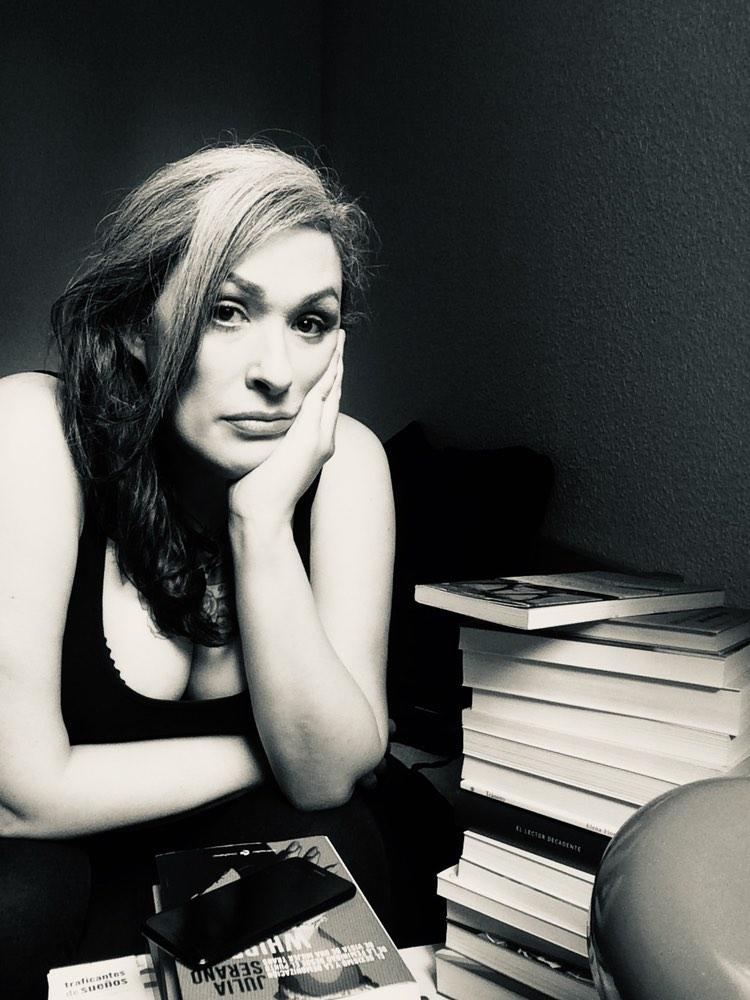
- Marrero in 2020
- Born: 2 March 1972; Las Palmas, Canary Islands, Spain
- Died: 17 May 2024 (aged 52); Madrid, Spain
- Occupations: Artist, singer, actress

Roberta Lucía Marrero Gutiérrez (2 March 1972 – 17 May 2024) was a Spanish artist, singer, and actress.

== Artistic career ==
In her works as an illustrator, Roberta Marrero mixed and de-contextualized popular images, giving rise to new meanings, and using the technique of artistic appropriation. For example, in her first published book, Dictadores (2015), she transforms several photographs of icons of totalitarianism with images related to the pop world. She thus shows Mao Zedong surrounded by characters whose faces have been covered by Hello Kitty heads, and presents a portrait of Francisco Franco made up with a lightning bolt on his face, in the style of David Bowie on the cover of Aladdin Sane. With this publication, the artist stated that her intention was to "Vandalize a fascist message and turn it into another one of freedom."

In her 2016 book El bebé verde: infancia, transexualidad y héroes del pop, a graphic novel with a prologue by the writer Virginie Despentes, Marrero collects memories of her childhood and her transsexuality, explaining how the worldview of various artists from pop music, literature, and cinema inspired her, especially Boy George. The main themes in her work are power, death, fame, love, and politics.

In addition to exhibiting in Spanish galleries such as "La Fiambrera" in Madrid, some of her works have been included in exhibitions such as David Bowie Is, organized by the Victoria and Albert Museum in London, and Piaf, at the Bibliothèque nationale de France. Joe Dallesandro, model, actor, and star of Andy Warhol's The Factory, chose one of her illustrations for limited edition t-shirts. Precisely, the author pointed to Warhol as her main influence. In addition, she sampled from the Fauvist movement, expressionism, surrealism, Catholic religious painting, classical Hollywood, and punk.

In 2016, Marrero denounced British fashion designer Vivienne Westwood on Social Media, claiming that one of her works had been plagiarized on a shirt sold through Westwood's website. The designer and her husband Andreas Kronthaler responded that the image had been copied without knowledge that it was a work by a contemporary artist.

As a musician, Marrero released two electropop albums and worked as a DJ at several Spanish clubs.

== Death ==
Marrero died by suicide in Madrid on 17 May 2024, at the age of 52.

== Works ==
=== Publications ===
- Dictadores (2015), Ediciones Hidroavión, ISBN 9788494414312
- El bebé verde: infancia, transexualidad y héroes del pop (2016), Lunwerg Editores, ISBN 9788416489930
- We Can Be Heroes. Una celebración de la cultura LGTBQ+ (2018), Lunwerg Editores, ISBN 9788416890743
- Todo era por ser fuego. Poemas de chulos, trans y travestis. (2022), Continta me tienes, ISBN 9788412441659

=== Discography ===
- A la vanguardia del peligro (2005)
- Claroscuro (2007)

=== Filmography ===
- Descongélate! (2003), directed by Dunia Ayaso and Félix Sabroso
