= Mariola Fuentes =

Spanish actress (born 1970)

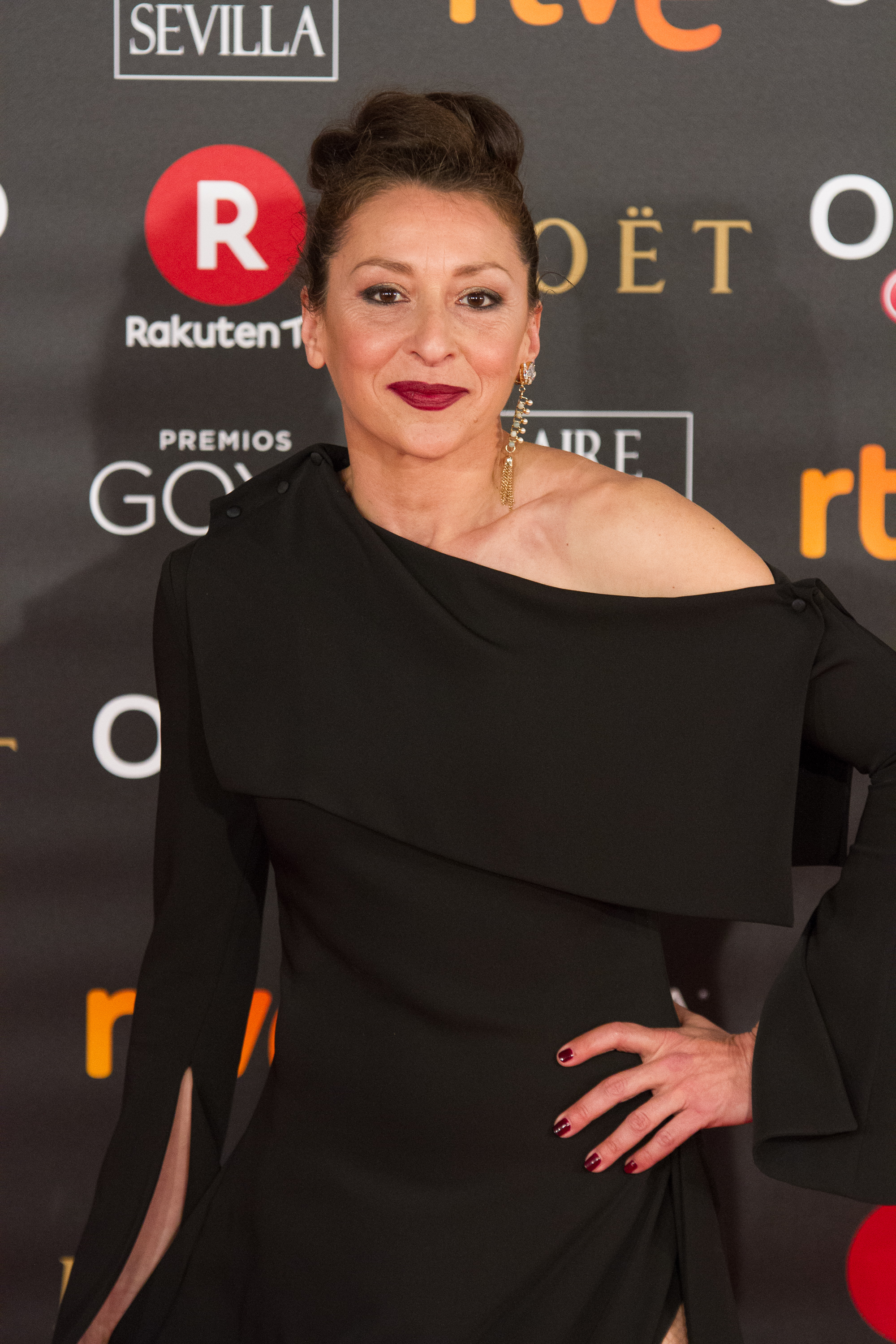
Fuentes at the 32nd Goya Awards in 2018

Mariola Fuentes (born 12 August 1970) is a Spanish actress.

She was born in Marbella. She usually plays tragicomical characters. She started to be known in 1997, thanks to her role in Perdona bonita, pero Lucas me quería a mí. In 1998, her role in the TVE1 series A las once en casa was very popular.

== Films ==
- Días contados (1994)
- Chevrolet (1997)
- Perdona bonita, pero Lucas me quería a mí (1997)
- ¿De qué se ríen las mujeres? (1997)
- Carne trémula (1997)
- Insomnio (1998)
- Torrente, el brazo tonto de la ley (1998)
- El grito en el cielo (1998)
- La primera noche de mi vida (1998)
- Manolito Gafotas (1999)
- Las buenas intenciones (2000)
- Sexo por compasión (2000)
- El cielo abierto (2001)
- Hable con ella (2002)
- Poniente (2002)
- Hotel Danubio (2003)
- Dos tipos duros (2003)
- Descongélate! (2003)
- Trileros (2003)
- La vida perra de Juanita Narboni (2005)
- Volando voy (2006)
- Chuecatown (2007)
- Los abrazos rotos (2009) as Edurne
- El salto (2024) as Carmela
