= The Marked Woman =

The Marked Woman or Marked Woman may refer to:

- The Marked Woman (1914 film) starring Walter Connolly
- Marked Woman, 1937 crime film
- The Marked Woman (2026 film), thriller film directed by Gabe Ibáñez
