= Whisky (film) =

2004 film

- Theatrical poster
- Directed by: Juan Pablo Rebella; Pablo Stoll
- Written by: Gonzalo Delgado; Juan Pablo Rebella; Pablo Stoll
- Produced by: Christoph Friedel; Hernán Musaluppi
- Starring: Andrés Pazos; Mirella Pascual; Jorge Bolani
- Cinematography: Bárbara Álvarez
- Edited by: Fernando Epstein
- Music by: Pequeña Orquesta Reincidentes
- Distributed by: MK2 Diffusion
- Release date: 19 May 2004 (Cannes)
- Running time: 99 minutes
- Countries: Argentina; Germany; Spain; Uruguay
- Languages: Spanish; Italian
- Budget: $500,000 (estimated)

Whisky is a 2004 tragicomedy film directed by Juan Pablo Rebella and Pablo Stoll. The film stars Andrés Pazos, Mirella Pascual, Jorge Bolani, Ana Katz, and Daniel Hendler. It has sparse dialogue and the three principal actors play very rigid roles depicting little emotion. It was premiered at the 2004 Cannes Film Festival where it won the Un Certain Regard and FIPRESCI Awards. It was Rebella's last film as he died in 2006, two years after the release of the film.

== Plot ==
Jacobo, the owner of a sock factory, lives his life with routine and isolation. When his brother, Herman, comes to visit him for the anniversary of their mother's death, Jacobo turns to the head-supervisor of his factory, Marta, for help. Jacobo asks Marta to pretend to be his wife to impress and convince his brother that he is part of a loving, healthy marriage. In the days before Herman's arrival, Jacobo and Marta re-decorate and clean Jacobo's apartment, have their picture taken together to place in the living room, and put on a facade of a happy marriage. Marta and Jacobo's relationship grows, but it's clear the two have very little in common. There is an awkward gap between the two characters, and it seems as though there is a barrier dividing them.

Jacobo is aware that his brother has become more successful since moving away while he devoted his time to nursing their dying mother, rather than establishing the success of his own business. Jacobo greets Herman at the airport and they exchange socks from their respective factories. Herman's visit is initially quiet and uneasy as the brothers clearly have little in common. The relationship between the two brothers felt awkward and uncomfortable because they acted as if they were two strangers, not two biological brothers. Shortly before he is due to return home, Herman asks Jacobo and Marta to accompany him on a visit to a resort in Piriápolis where he and Jacobo spent time as children with their parents. Marta is keen to go and Jacobo reluctantly agrees. During their visit to Piriápolis, Marta and Herman become closer, potentially developing feelings for one another. There is suspicion of a secret relationship, to which Jacobo catches on. Furthermore, Jacobo hints at possibly having deeper feelings for Marta. However, Herman's outgoing and charismatic personality seems to sway Marta, reducing any chance Jacobo has with her. Through the duration of this trip, Jacobo remains cold and unemotional towards both the other characters and seems anxious for the trip to end.

Herman hands Jacobo a stack of money just before he is to return home as recompense for the time he spent caring for their mother. Jacobo first refuses to accept the money, but after hearing Herman perform a love song to Marta which she is seen listening to earlier in a Karaoke restaurant where the three of them dine, he accepts it. Jacobo has even more resentment towards his brother for developing a relationship with Marta. Herman is married and has children while Jacobo is alone but Herman also now has Marta in his life. Jacobo feels resentful and jealous of his brother Herman. This is another defeat for Jacobo. Later that night Jacobo goes alone to a casino, placing all the money on Black 24 in a game of roulette, and to his surprise wins. He keeps some of the money but wraps the larger part up as a present for Marta. As they say goodbye to Herman, Marta presses a note into his hand, telling him to read it on the plane. When they get back home, Jacobo calls a taxi for Marta and gives her the cash, which she is last seen holding in the back of the cab. Routinely, Marta says "See you tomorrow," but does not turn up for work the following morning. Jacobo goes through the same routine as always, continuing on with his dull life without Marta.

== Cast ==
- Andrés Pazos as Jacobo Koller
- Mirella Pascual as Marta Acuña
- Jorge Bolani as Herman Koller
- Ana Katz as Graciela, the young wife
- Daniel Hendler as Martín, the young husband
- Verónica Perrotta as Jacobo's worker 1
- Mariana Velazques as Jacobo's worker 2
- Dumas Lerena as Isaac, Jacobo's client
- Damián Barrera as Andrés, the receptionist
- Alfonso Tort as Juan Carlos, the bellboy
- Francisca Barreira as Young girl singer
- Richard G. Hogan as Young Beggar (uncredited)

== Exhibition ==
The film was first presented at the 2004 Cannes Film Festival on May 19.

The picture was screened at various film festivals, including: the La Rochelle Film Festival, France; the Karlovy Vary Film Festival, Czech Republic; the Brussels Cinédécouvertes Film Festival, Belgium; the Copenhagen International Film Festival, Denmark; the Toronto International Film Festival, Canada; Films from the South, Norway; and others. It was awarded the Colón de Oro at the Festival de Cine Iberoamericano de Huelva. It was also awarded the grand prize at the 17th Tokyo International Film Festival.

== Reception ==
The film was well received by film critics and film festivals. On Rotten Tomatoes it has a 100% rating based on reviews from 16 critics. On Metacritic it has a 66% score based on reviews from 9 critics, indicating "generally favorable reviews".

Critic Manohla Dargis, of The New York Times said, "the film is a model of both fiscal and narrative economy, and the kind of work – gleaned from the mysteries of consciousness, telling quotidian details and a sense of aesthetic proportion – that is too often missing from American independent cinema." Whisky, as described on RogersMovieNation, "captures the lonely ache of a loveless life"
