= Boystown (film) =

- Spanish: Chuecatown
- Directed by: Juan Flahn
- Screenplay by: Félix Sabroso; Dunia Ayaso; Juan Flahn
- Produced by: Carlos Fernández; Julio Fernández; Fernando Monje
- Starring: Pepón Nieto; Pablo Puyol; Concha Velasco; Rosa Mª Sardá; Carlos Fuentes; Edu Soto
- Cinematography: Juan Carlos Lausín
- Edited by: Ascen Marchena
- Music by: David San José
- Production companies: Castelao Producciones; Canónigo Films
- Distributed by: Filmax
- Release date: 6 July 2007
- Running time: 101 minutes
- Country: Spain
- Language: Spanish

Boystown (Spanish: Chuecatown) is a 2007 Spanish comedy film directed by Juan Flahn from a screenplay by Flahn, Félix Sabroso and Dunia Ayaso.

== Synopsis ==
The plot focuses on the neighborhood of Chueca that is located in Madrid. Victor, an owner of a real-estate company, wants to have a monopoly over all the apartments in Chueca, in order to turn it into the Madrid version of the Castro district in San Francisco, but the apartments are owned by senior citizens that do not want to sell to him. Víctor decides to take matters into his own hands and murder anyone that stands in his way. Everything is going Víctor's way until Rey and Luis, a gay couple, inherit the apartment of Víctor's latest victim. Víctor tries to buy the apartment from Rey but he refuses to sell it because he wants his mother, Doña Antonia, to move into the apartment. Now Víctor has to find a way to kill Doña Antonia while police are out looking for the murderer that is on the loose in Chueca.

== Cast ==
- Pepón Nieto as Leo
- Pablo Puyol as Víctor
- Concha Velasco as Antonia
- Rosa Maria Sardà as Mila
- Carlos Fuentes as Rey
- Edu Soto as Luis
- Mariola Fuentes as Lola
- Montserrat Alcoverro as Susi
- Ángel Burgos as Mario
- Margarita Calatayud as Abuela de Lola
- Joan Crosas as Sr. Pardo
- Antonio Municio as Raul
- Carmen Pardo as Vecina
- Germán Tormo as Comisario
- Pedro Veral as Fran

== Awards ==
The film was awarded Best International Feature at FilmOut San Diego in 2008.

== See also ==
- List of Spanish films of 2007
