= Guillermo Pfening =

Argentine actor and director (born 1978)

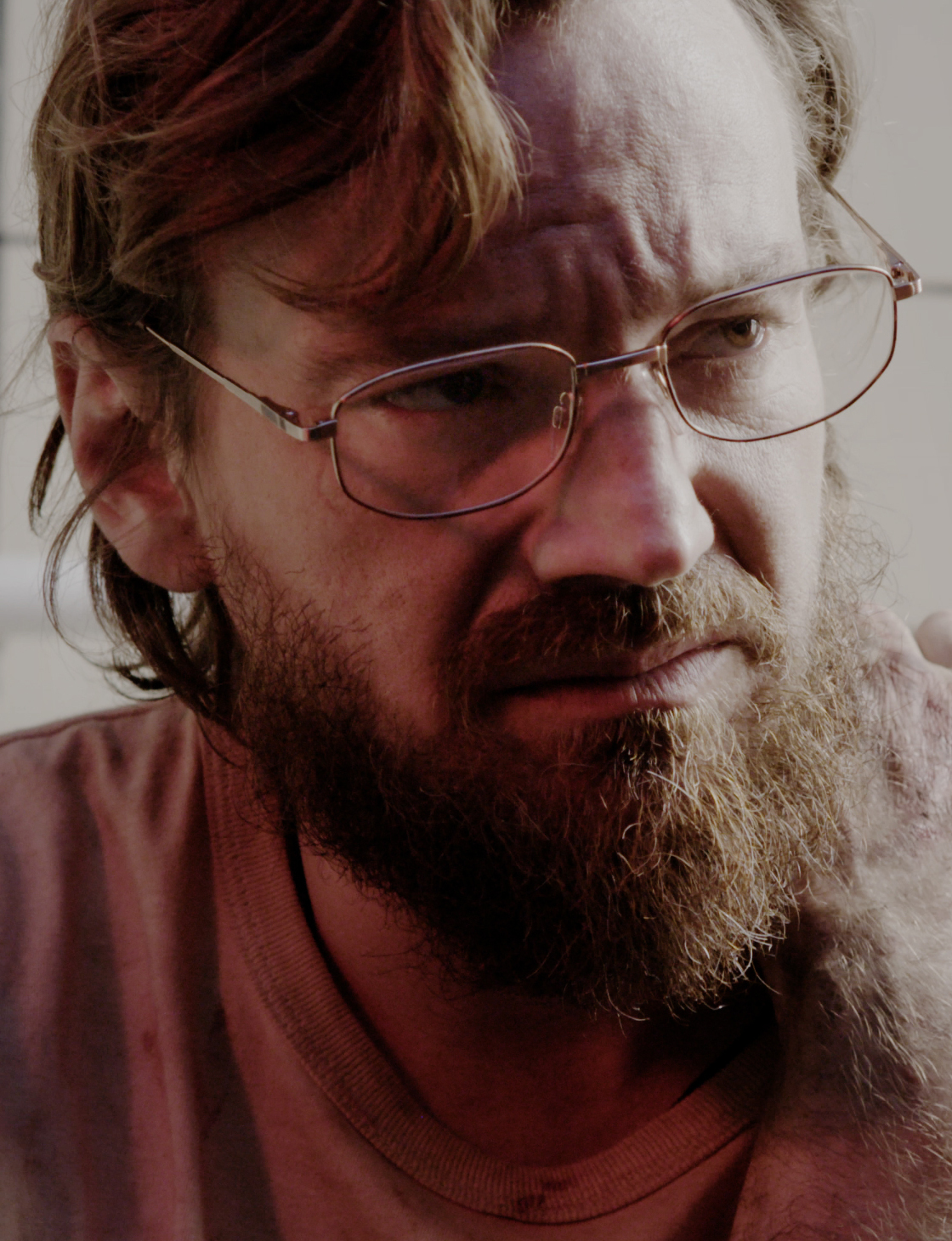
- Pfening in a 2015 acting role
- Born: 9 December 1978 (age 47); Marcos Juárez, Córdoba Province, Argentina
- Occupations: Actor; film director
- Years active: 1998–present

Guillermo Pfening (born 9 December 1978) is an Argentine actor and film director.

== Early life and education ==
Pfening, who has German ancestry, was born in 1978 in Marcos Juárez, a city in Córdoba Province of about 30,000 inhabitants. At the age of 18, he moved to Buenos Aires to study social communication, later changing to philosophy and literature and history of the arts at the University of Buenos Aires (UBA). While attending classes at UBA, Pfening took classes of theatre, beginning to get important acting roles in 2002. As a consequence, he gradually put aside his studies, taking only a single assignment per year, describing it as a hobby.

== Career ==
In 2004, Pfening made his directorial debut with a short film titled Caíto, which won a prize honouring French filmmaker Georges Méliès by the French Embassy and the Argentine Film Archive. The short film is a self-referential documentary about his family living in Marcos Juárez, as well as the relationship with his younger brother, who has muscular dystrophy. In August 2019, Pfening served as a juror in the comeback of the Mélliès Award in Buenos Aires.

Pfening's credits as an actor include main roles in the 2010 TV film Belgrano, the HBO series Foodie Love, Netflix original Welcome to Eden, as well as the 2023 drama film Alma, sharing cast with fellow Argentines Carolina Kopelioff and Florencia Otero. Aside of his works in Argentine cinema and television, Pfening took part in some international productions like the 2020 Spanish thriller The Paramedic, and Fever Dream by Peruvian director Claudia Llosa, with the film being an adaptation of Argentine writer Samanta Schweblin's novel of the same name, and premiered by Netflix at the 69th San Sebastián International Film Festival.

Among his accolades, Pfening was awarded with the Best Actor in a Narrative Feature Film award at the 2017 Tribeca Festival for his role in queer drama Nobody's Watching of Argentine director Julia Solomonoff, where Pfening portrays an Argentine actor who immigrates to the United States, settling in New York City and seeking a new life while struggling with language and cultural barriers. Pfening received critical acclaim for his role in Nobody's Watching, with critics praising his "melancholic and full of nuances" acting.

== Personal life ==
Pfening is openly gay. He has stated that his coming out as gay did not mean much to his father Néstor, but was harder to accept for his brothers. Pfening said that his brothers did not object to his sexual orientation, instead showing confusion because Pfening had dated women while he lived in Marcos Juárez. In the same interview, he added that while always knowing that he was gay, as a young man he "wanted to have sex" and "(being) with women was the norm" in Marcos Juárez.

In regard with his sexual orientation, Pfening said that he does not conceal who he is but that he does not share some things with the LGBTQ movements, instead preferring to tell his story with the aim of helping others.

Pfening has a daughter named Asia, whom he had with his friend Cynthia Pinasco as part of a coparenting project they shared. The girl was born in 2014, with Pfening saying that he had spoken with Pinasco about having a child under those terms, agreeing to share custody of the baby. He added that he and Pinasco had made a promise that if they did not have a child of their own nor in a relationship with a partner by the age of 35, they would conceive a baby together.

He is engaged with a longtime partner, Rafael, who helps raise Asia, taking an important role in the girl's upbringing. According to a November 2020 interview, Asia spent a week with Pfening and his partner, and one week with her mother.

Pfening's mother, Alicia Caloso, was a dermatologist who developed an addiction to cosmetic surgeries and beauty treatments. He recounted that she would meet with her friends to inject themselves with liquid silicone. When he was 26, Pfening moved with her to avoid committing her to a mental hospital. He said that his mother suffered intense pains towards the end of her life, killing herself in 2008. As a result of his relationship with his mother, Pfening produced a film titled Alicia, where actress Cecilia Roth plays the role of Pfening's mother.

His father, Néstor, died in April 2019 in Marcos Juárez, while Pfening was filming Foodie Love in Spain.

He resides in Argentina and has stated that he prefers European cinema over American industry films, adding that sharing Spanish language, despite having different accents and intonation, helps Argentina and Spain to share cinematographic projects. In an interview with Spanish radio Los 40, Pfening said that he chooses to live in Argentina, recalling that he had not even considered leaving the country during its most difficult times.

== Selected works ==
| Year | Title | Role | Notes | Ref. |
|---|---|---|---|---|
| 1998 | Corazón iluminado | Young Godoy | First acting role | |
| 2001 | Rodrigo, la película | Ezequiel | Main role. Made shortly after the death of Argentine cuarteto singer Rodrigo | |
| 2007 | The Effect of Love | Martín | Argentine film | |
| 2007 | XXY | Narrator (voice only) | Lucía Puenzo production | |
| 2011 | Belgrano | Dr. Terranova | Argentine TV film | |
| 2013 | The German Doctor | Klaus | Lucía Puenzo production | |
| 2017 | Nobody's Watching | Nico | Awarded with a Tribeca Festival award | |
| 2018 | My Best Friend | Andrés | Argentine film | |
| 2020 | The Paramedic | Ricardo | Spanish film | |
| 2021 | Fever Dream | Marco | Film adaptation of the novel of the same name by Argentine author Samanta Schweblin | |

== Selected accolades ==
| Award | Date of ceremony | Category | Work | Result | Ref. |
|---|---|---|---|---|---|
| George Mélliès Award | 2004 | Best Short Film | Caíto | Won | |
| Tribeca Festival | 2017 | Best Actor in a Narrative Feature Film | Nadie nos mira | Won | |
