= The Island Inside =

- Theatrical release poster
- Spanish: La isla interior
- Directed by: Dunia Ayaso; Félix Sabroso
- Screenplay by: Dunia Ayaso; Félix Sabroso
- Starring: Candela Peña; Alberto San Juan; Cristina Marcos; Celso Bugallo; Antonio de la Torre; Geraldine Chaplin
- Cinematography: Juan A. Castaño
- Edited by: Ascen Marchena
- Music by: Lucas Vidal
- Production companies: Mecanismo Films; La Mirada Producciones; Ayaso y Sabroso Producciones; Oberon Cinematográfica
- Distributed by: Alta Classics
- Release dates: 29 October 2009 (Seminci); 9 April 2010 (Spain)
- Running time: 90 minutes
- Country: Spain
- Language: Spanish

The Island Inside (Spanish: La isla interior) is a 2009 film directed by Dunia Ayaso and Félix Sabroso.

== Plot ==
Three siblings try fighting the schizophrenia they inherited from their father.

== Cast ==
- Candela Peña as Coral
- Alberto San Juan as Martín
- Cristina Marcos as Gracia
- Celso Bugallo as Juan
- Antonio de la Torre as Iván
- Geraldine Chaplin as Victoria
- Emi Cazorla as Sara
- Gara Mora as Claudia
- Vicente Ayala as Raúl
- Paola Bontempi

== Release ==
The film was presented at the 54th Valladolid International Film Festival (Seminci) on 29 October 2009.

== Accolades ==
Year	Award	Category	Nominee(s)	Result	Ref.
2009	54th Valladolid International Film Festival	Best Actor	Alberto San Juan	Won	

== See also ==
- List of Spanish films of 2010
