= Mirella Pascual =

Uruguayan actress

- Born: Mirella Pascual Jaurena; April 10, 1954 (age 71); Montevideo, Uruguay
- Children: 4

Mirella Pascual Jaurena (born April 10, 1954) is an Uruguayan actress.

== Filmography ==
=== Film ===
| Year | Title | Role | Notes |
|---|---|---|---|
| 2004 | Whisky | Marta Acuña | |
| 2009 | El cuarto de Leo (Leo's Room) | Leo's mother | |
| 2009 | El último verano de la Boyita (The Last Summer of La Boyita) | Elba | |
| 2010 | Miss Tacuarembó | Haydeé | |
| 2011 | Penumbra (Gloom) | Encarnación | |
| 2014 | Historia del Miedo (History of Fear) | Teresa | |
| 2015 | Mi amiga del parque (My Friend from the Park) | Yazmina | |
| 2016 | Era el Cielo (It was the Heaven) | Malena Gorostiaga | |
| 2017 | Vigilia | Carmen | |
| 2017 | Nobody's Watching | Nico's mother | |
| 2018 | El motoarrebatador (The Snatch Thief) | Flora | |
| 2018 | La noche de 12 años (A Twelve-Year Night) | Lucy Cordano | |
| 2019 | Alelí | Lilián Mazzotti | |
| 2021 | El perro que no calla (The Dog Who Wouldn't Be Quiet) | Teacher | |
| 2022 | Desperté con un sueño (I woke up with a dream) | Sonia | |
| 2022 | El visitante (The Visitor) | | |

=== Television ===
| Year | Title | Role | Notes |
|---|---|---|---|
| 2011 | Maltratadas | Susana | 2 episodes |
| 2011 | Dance! La Fuerza del Corazón | Gabe | Main role |
| 2022–present | Yosi, the Regretful Spy | Zuni | Supporting role |
| 2023 | El amor después del amor | Zulema "Belia" Ramírez | Supporting role |
