= Canta y no llores (2024 film) =

Canta y No Llores
- Mexican theatrical release poster
- Directed by: Félix Sabroso
- Written by: Frank Ariza; Félix Sabroso
- Produced by: Frank Ariza; Desiree Reyes
- Starring: Consuelo Duval; Michelle Rodríguez; Patricia Maqueo
- Cinematography: Peyi Guzmán
- Edited by: Ascen Marchena
- Production companies: AF; Churriwood; Ebribari; Canta y No Llores Films Spain; BTF Media
- Distributed by: Star Distribution
- Release dates: March 21, 2024 (Mexico); April 11, 2024 (Dominican Republic)
- Countries: Mexico; Dominican Republic; Spain
- Language: Spanish

Canta y no llores (lit. 'Sing and Don't Cry') is a 2024 comedy film directed by Félix Sabroso and written by Frank Ariza and Félix Sabroso. It stars Consuelo Duval, Michelle Rodríguez, and Patricia Maqueo.

== Synopsis ==
Pepa lives and works with her two sons and granddaughter in a taco food truck. Beli, Pepa's daughter, has a talent for singing, but she has not realized her dream of being a singer. In a car accident, they find a bag with money that forces the family to flee to the Dominican Republic to start a new life. There, they meet Caro, an artist representative who will offer to help Beli. When everything seems to be going smoothly, an unexpected character, from whom the family had to flee, lands in the Dominican Republic to settle scores.

== Cast ==
The actors participating in this film are:

- Consuelo Duval as Pepa
- Michelle Rodríguez as Beli
- Patricia Maqueo as Lucía
- Francisco Rueda as Toni
- Lumi Lizardo as Caro
- Luis del Valle as Salvador
- Ana Maria Arias
- Victor Gómez as Payaso-mafioso

== Production ==
The film is a Mexican-Spanish-Dominican co-production by Churriwood, Canta y No Llores Films Spain, AF, BTF Media, and Ebribari Audiovisual. It was shot in 2023 in the Dominican Republic.

== Release ==
Distributed by Star Distribution, the film was released theatrically in Mexico on March 21, 2024. The opening in Dominican Republic theatres was set for April 11, 2024.

== See also ==
- List of Mexican films of 2024
