= Juan Pablo Rebella =

Uruguayan film director (1974–2006)

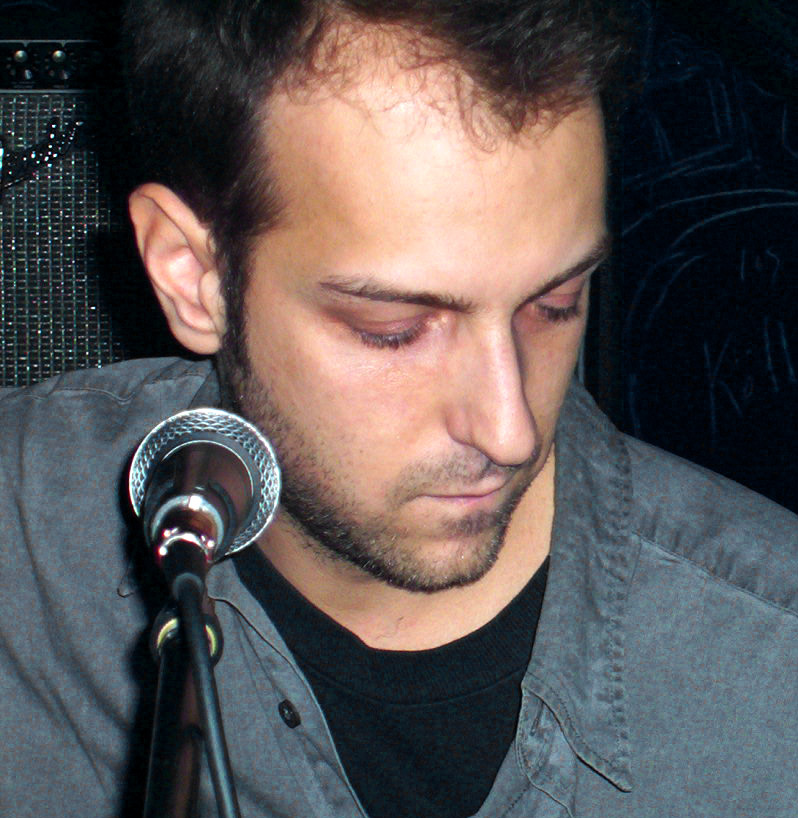
Juan Pablo Rebella in 2004

Juan Pablo Rebella (born 1974, in Montevideo – died July 5, 2006) was a Uruguayan film director and screenwriter.

== Biography ==
He attended the Catholic University of Uruguay where he studied social communication.

In 2004 Rebella and Stoll released their second feature film Whisky, at the 2004 Cannes Film Festival and opened to critical acclaim, winning the Regard Original Award.

Rebella shot himself in 2006 at the age of 32. He is buried at Cementerio del Buceo, Montevideo.
