= The Headless Woman (2008 film) =

- Theatrical release poster
- Directed by: Lucrecia Martel
- Written by: Lucrecia Martel
- Produced by: Agustín Almodóvar; Pedro Almodóvar; Tilde Corsi; Verónica Cura; Esther García; Lucrecia Martel; Cesare Petrillo; Enrique Piñeyro; Vieri Razzini; Marianne Slot
- Starring: María Onetto; Claudia Cantero; Ines Efron; César Bordón; Daniel Genoud; Guillermo Arengo; María Vaner
- Cinematography: Bárbara Álvarez
- Edited by: Miguel Schverdfinger
- Music by: Roberta Ainstein
- Production companies: Aquafilms; El Deseo; Slot Machine; Teodora Film; R&C Produzioni
- Distributed by: Distribution Company Sudamericana (Argentina); Warner Bros. España (Spain); Ad Vitam Distribution (France); Teodora Film (Italy); Focus Features International (International)
- Release dates: 21 May 2008 (Cannes); 21 August 2008 (Argentina)
- Running time: 87 minutes
- Countries: Argentina; Spain; France; Italy
- Language: Spanish
- Box office: $100,177 (Argentina)

The Headless Woman (Spanish: La mujer sin cabeza) is a 2008 Argentine psychological drama art film written and directed by Lucrecia Martel. It premiered at the 2008 Cannes Film Festival, where Martel was the sole female director in the running for the Palme d'Or, and opened nationwide on August 21, 2008.

The plot revolves around Verónica, who hits something while driving on a deserted road near Salta. Not being sure if she has hit a person or an animal, she drives off and becomes increasingly mentally disturbed

While The Headless Woman was mostly lauded by critics for its cinematography and social commentary, others were critical towards the film's slow pace and lack of clear narrative. In 2016, the film was ranked No. 89th on BBC's list of the 100 greatest films of the 21st century. In 2022, it was selected as the 24th greatest film of Argentine cinema in a poll organized in 2022 by the specialized magazines La vida útil, Taipei and La tierra quema, which was presented at the Mar del Plata International Film Festival.

== Plot ==
Verónica ("Vero"), a bourgeois Argentine woman, drives home from recreational swimming in rural Salta. Distracted by her cell phone, she looks down to answer it and hits something. Shocked, she collects herself and drives away; though she does not see it, a dog lies dead on the ground behind her.

Vero drives to the hospital where her brother works for a cut to her head and receives an x-ray. Before she can be further examined, she flees to a nearby hotel, the disturbing nature of her accident settling in. She calls her husband's cousin, Juan Manuel, who consoles her before the two have sex.

The next day, Vero returns home, where she lives with her husband Marcos and their Indigenous maids, still feeling deeply out of place and light-headed. She attempts to go to work at her dentistry office but her staff recommends she go home. Instead, she stops by her cousin Josefina's house, where she socialises with family, who notice the front of her car is severely damaged.

Vero visits a local recreation center, where she sees a boy on the ground, passed out from heat stroke. The image of the boy's lifeless body causes a panic attack, and she is consoled by a staff member, who offers her water and a hug. Later that day, Vero tells Marcos she believes she killed a person in a hit and run. Marcos takes her to the scene of the accident; they see something on the side of the road, which her husband insists is merely a dog. Marcos tells Juan Manuel, who works for the fire brigade, about Vero's concerns, but he claims there have been no claims of note.

Soon after, the body of a servant's child is recovered from a local canal nearby the location of Vero's accident. Josefina's daughter Candita, who has a crush on Vero, claims she wants to know more about "the boy who was murdered," but Vero insists the boy accidentally drowned. At home, Vero works with a new gardener to improve the look of the backyard.

Vero remains unconvinced that she only struck a dog, still disoriented and paranoid. To hopefully jog her memory of the fatal night, she revisits the hospital, but they claim there is no record of her admission let alone x-ray results, both scrubbed by her brother. At home, a young Indigenous boy bikes by and offers to wash her car; Vero gives him a simple chore and offers him food, clothing, and more work.

Vero is invited to a posh party at the hotel where she stayed after the accident. She learns they too have no record of her stay, scrubbed by Juan Manuel. Though still disturbed, she attends the party, smiling weakly and dazedly as people enjoy the evening around her.

== Cast ==
- María Onetto as Verónica
- Claudia Cantero as Josefina
- César Bordón as Marcos
- Daniel Genoud as Juan Manuel
- Guillermo Arengo as Marcelo
- Inés Efron as Candita
- Alicia Muxo as Prima Rosita
- Pía Uribelarrea as Prima Tere
- María Vaner as Tía Lala

== Reception ==
=== Critical response ===
The Headless Woman garnered mostly positive reviews from film critics. On review aggregator website Rotten Tomatoes, the film holds a 75% approval rating based on 52 reviews, with a rating average of 6.89 out of 10. The site's consensus states: "Careful and slight, Lucretia Martel's Headless Woman doesn't fit neatly into a clear storyline, but supports itself with ethereal visuals." At Metacritic, which assigns a weighted mean rating out of 0–100 reviews from film critics, the film has a score of 81 based on 12 reviews, classified as a universally acclaimed film.

=== Accolades ===
Award	Date of ceremony^{[I]}	Category	Recipients and nominees	Outcome
ACE Awards	17 April 2010	Best Director	Lucrecia Martel	Won
Argentine Academy of Cinematography Arts and Sciences Awards	15 December 2008	Best Actress	María Onetto	Nominated
Argentine Academy of Cinematography Arts and Sciences Awards	15 December 2008	Best Art Direction	María Eugenia Sueiro	Nominated
Argentine Academy of Cinematography Arts and Sciences Awards	15 December 2008	Best Cinematography	Bárbara Álvarez	Nominated
Argentine Academy of Cinematography Arts and Sciences Awards	15 December 2008	Best Costume Design	Julio Suárez	Nominated
Argentine Academy of Cinematography Arts and Sciences Awards	15 December 2008	Best Director	Lucrecia Martel	Won
Argentine Academy of Cinematography Arts and Sciences Awards	15 December 2008	Best Editing	Miguel Schverdfinger	Nominated
Argentine Academy of Cinematography Arts and Sciences Awards	15 December 2008	Best Film	The Headless Woman	Won
Argentine Academy of Cinematography Arts and Sciences Awards	15 December 2008	Best Screenplay, Original	Lucrecia Martel	Won
Argentine Academy of Cinematography Arts and Sciences Awards	15 December 2008	Best Sound	Guido Berenblum	Nominated
Argentine Academy of Cinematography Arts and Sciences Awards	15 December 2008	Best Supporting Actress	Claudia Cantero; María Vaner	Nominated
Argentinean Film Critics Association Awards	10 August 2009	Best Actress	María Onetto	Won
Argentinean Film Critics Association Awards	10 August 2009	Best Director	Lucrecia Martel	Nominated
Argentinean Film Critics Association Awards	10 August 2009	Best Supporting Actress	María Vaner	Nominated
Cannes Film Festival	25 May 2008	Palme d'Or	Lucrecia Martel	Nominated
Lima Latin American Film Festival	15 August 2008	Critics Award	The Headless Woman	Won
Rio de Janeiro International Film Festival	9 October 2008	FIPRESCI Award	Lucrecia Martel	Won
VFCC Awards	11 January 2010	Best Foreign Language Film	The Headless Woman	Won

^{^[I]} Each year is linked to the article about the awards held that year.

== See also ==
- Mental illness in film
