= Sisters (2005 film) =

2005 film directed by Julia Solomonoff

- Theatrical release poster
- Spanish: Hermanas
- Directed by: Julia Solomonoff
- Written by: Julia Solomonoff
- Produced by: Mariela Besuievski; Pablo Bossi; Florencia Enghel; Gerardo Herrero; Vanessa Ragone; Walter Salles; Ariel Saúl
- Starring: Valeria Bertuccelli; Ingrid Rubio; Adrián Navarro
- Cinematography: Ramiro Civita
- Edited by: Rosario Suárez
- Music by: Jorge Drexler; Lucio Godoy
- Production companies: Cruzdelsur Zona Audiovisual; Patagonik Film Group; Tornasol Films; Videofilmes
- Distributed by: Cinema Tropical
- Release dates: April 14, 2005 (BAFICI); April 28, 2005 (Argentina); November 25, 2005 (Spain)
- Running time: 88 minutes
- Countries: Argentina; Brazil; Spain
- Language: Spanish

Sisters (Spanish: Hermanas) is a 2005 drama film written and directed by Julia Solomonoff, her first feature motion picture. The picture has a number of producers, including: Mariela Besuievski, Pablo Bossi, Florencia Enghel, Gerardo Herrero, Vanessa Ragone, Walter Salles, and Ariel Saúl.

The film features Valeria Bertuccelli, Ingrid Rubio, among others.

== Plot ==
In 1976, during the political turmoil in Argentina, two sisters flee their country right after Natalia's politically active boyfriend Martin disappears; one goes to Spain, and the other to Texas, United States.

After eight years in Spain, Natalia (Ingrid Rubio) travels to Texas to visit her sister Elena (Valeria Bertuccelli), who's now a suburban wife and mother.

She brings with her their father's manuscript of his last novel. The unpublished novel reveals the story of their family during the Argentine dictatorship.

Using extensive flashbacks of the sisters' early years in Argentina during the junta dictatorship, the director reveals family guilt and suppressed resentment.

== Cast ==
- Valeria Bertuccelli as Elena Levín
- Ingrid Rubio as Natalia Levin
- Adrián Navarro as Sebastián Morini
- Nicolás Pauls as Martín García Solís
- Milton De La Canal as Tomás Morini
- Horacio Peña as David Levin
- Mónica Galán as Marta Levín
- Eusebio Poncela as Luis Morini
- Pedro Pascal as Steve
- Gustavo Pastorini as American Tourist

== Background ==
The film is based on the real political events that took place in Argentina after Jorge Rafael Videla's reactionary military junta assumed power on March 24, 1976. During the junta's rule: the parliament was suspended, unions, political parties and provincial governments were banned, and in what became known as the Dirty War between 9,000 and 30,000 people deemed left-wing "subversives" disappeared from society.

== Production ==
Sisters is an Argentine-Spanish-Brazilian co-production by Cruzdelsur Zona Audiovisual, Patagonik Film Group, Tornasol Films and Videofilmes.

== Release ==
The film was presented at the Buenos Aires Independent Film Festival (BAFICI) in April 2005, with a theatrical release date in Argentina set for 28 April 2005. It was released theatrically in Spain on 25 November 2005.

== Critical reception ==
Jeannette Catsoulis, film critic for The New York Times liked the film, especially the acting of Valeria Bertuccelli and Ingrid Rubio, and wrote, "Though constrained by a directing style that insists on coloring within the lines, the movie is most successful in the rocky emotional spaces in which the sisters renegotiate their relationship and in which Elena, struggling with English, endures the painful process of assimilation...both actresses make their director look very good indeed."

In the same vein, Jonathan Holland, film critic for Variety magazine, appreciated the acting but gave the film a mixed review and wrote, "The political skeleton of 1970's Argentina rolls out of the closet to mostly positive effect in Julia Solomonoff's Sisters, a solidly-built but somewhat airless debut from the assistant director of The Motorcycle Diaries. The complex plot doesn't fully exploit the possibilities for suspense, but first-class perfs, great atmospherics and an upbeat message combine to make the pic work better as a sibling drama than as a thriller."

Critic V.A. Mesetto thought the screenplay was predictable but also likes the acting, and wrote, "Solomonoff draws out vivid performances by Valeria Bertuccelli (Elena) and Ingrid Rubio (Natalia) that make up for the script's predictability."

Film critic Ed Gonzalez wrote, "Solomonoff doesn't strike very interesting contrasts between past and present, but her actresses certainly do: Rubio and Bertucelli express how resentment eats away at their characters' sisterhood so richly that the many flashbacks to Argentina, shot uninterestingly in gritty hand-held gestures, seem almost unnecessary."

On the review aggregator website Rotten Tomatoes, 71% of 7 critics' reviews are positive, with an average rating of 6.5/10.

== Distribution ==
The film was first presented at the Buenos Aires International Festival of Independent Cinema on April 14, 2005. It opened wide in the country on April 28, 2005.

The film was screened at various film festivals, including: the Toronto International Film Festival, Canada, on September 9, 2005; the São Paulo International Film Festival, Brazil; the Valladolid International Film Festival, Spain; the Bangkok International Film Festival, Thailand; the Toulouse Latin America Film Festival, France; and others.

In the United States it opened in New York City on December 6, 2006.

=== DVD ===
A Region 2 DVD, was released in Europe on May 16, 2006, by Cameo Media.

== Reception ==
=== Awards ===
Nominations

- Valladolid International Film Festival: Golden Spike, Julia Solomonoff; 2005.
- Butaca Awards: Butaca; Best Catalan Film Actress, Ingrid Rubio; 2006.
- Argentine Film Critics Association Awards: Silver Condor; Best Actress, Valeria Bertuccelli; Best Costume Design, Beatriz De Benedetto and Fátima Macera; 2006.

== See also ==
- List of Argentine films of 2005
- List of Spanish films of 2005
