= ¿De qué se ríen las mujeres? =

- Directed by: Joaquín Oristrell
- Screenplay by: Joaquín Oristrell; Juan Luis Iborra; Yolanda García Serrano; Manuel Gómez Pereira
- Starring: Verónica Forqué; Candela Peña; Adriana Ozores
- Cinematography: Fernando Arribas
- Music by: Joan Vives
- Production company: BocaBoca
- Distributed by: Columbia Tristar Films de España
- Release date: 28 February 1997
- Running time: 109 minute
- Country: Spain
- Language: Spanish

¿De qué se ríen las mujeres? (transl. 'What Do Women Laugh About?') is a 1997 Spanish comedy film directed by Joaquín Oristrell starring Verónica Forqué, Candela Peña and Adriana Ozores.

== Plot ==
A female comedy trio formed by the sisters Luci, Graci and Mari travel to Benidorm to perform despite the sudden death of Carlos, Luci's husband, during the wedding of Luqui, the sisters' father.

== Cast ==
- Verónica Forqué as Luci
- Candela Peña as Graci
- Adriana Ozores as Mari
- Juanjo Menéndez as Luqui
- François-Éric Gendron as Salva
- Jorge Bosch as Carlos
- Elena Anaya
- Carmen Balagué
- Jorge Sanz as Víctor
- Ángel de Andrés López
- Joaquín Climent
- Carlos Hipólito
- Mariola Fuentes
- Daniel Pérez

== Production ==
¿De qué se ríen las mujeres? is Joaquín Oristrell's directorial debut in a feature film. Oristrell penned the screenplay alongside Yolanda García Serrano, Juan Luis Iborra and Manuel Gómez Pereira. Fernando Arribas worked as cinematographer whereas Joan Vives was responsible for the music. Produced by BocaBoca, it was shot in between Madrid and Benidorm in 1996.

== Release ==
The film was released in Spain on 28 February 1997.

== See also ==
- List of Spanish films of 1997
