= Joaquín Oristrell =

Spanish film director and screenwriter (born 1953)

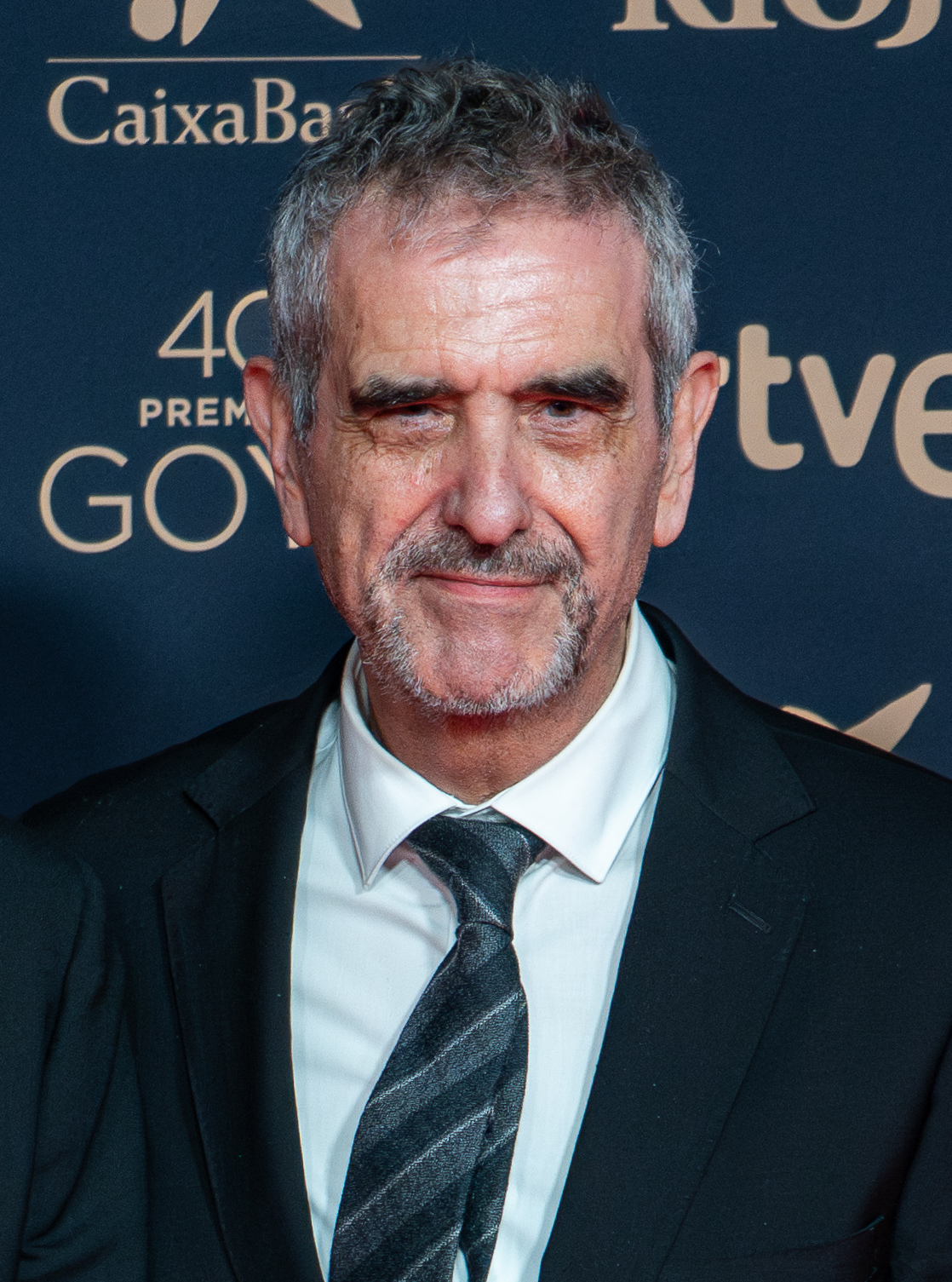
- Oristrell in 2026
- Born: Joaquín Oristrell Ventura; 15 September 1953 (age 72); Barcelona, Spain
- Occupations: Film director; television director; screenwriter; producer
- Relatives: Yolanda Ventura (cousin)

Joaquín Oristrell Ventura (born 15 September 1953) is a Spanish film director and screenwriter.

== Biography ==
Born in Barcelona on 15 September 1953, he is the cousin of actress Yolanda Ventura and nephew of trumpeter Rudy Ventura. He has written scripts to Manuel Gutiérrez Aragón, Fernando Colomo and other directors before his film debut in 1997 with ¿De qué se ríen las mujeres? (United States: DVD title, What Makes Women Laugh?).

== Selected filmography ==
=== Film ===
- Éxtasis (1996) (script)
- ¿De qué se ríen las mujeres? (1997)
- Novios (1998)
- Between Your Legs (1999)
- Sin vergüenza (2001) (director and script)
- Los abajo firmantes (2003)
- Cosas que hacen que la vida valga la pena (2004) (script)
- Inconscientes (2004)
- ¡Hay motivo! (2004)
- Reinas (2005) (script)
- Va a ser que nadie es perfecto (2006) (director)
- El próximo oriente (2006)
- Mediterranean Food (2009)
- Hablar (2015)

=== Television ===
- Un, dos, tres... responda otra vez (1982) (script)
- Cuéntame cómo pasó (2016–present) (script)
- Fugitiva (2018) (creator)
- HIT (2020) (creator)
- La última (2022) (creator)
