= My Best Friend (2018 film) =

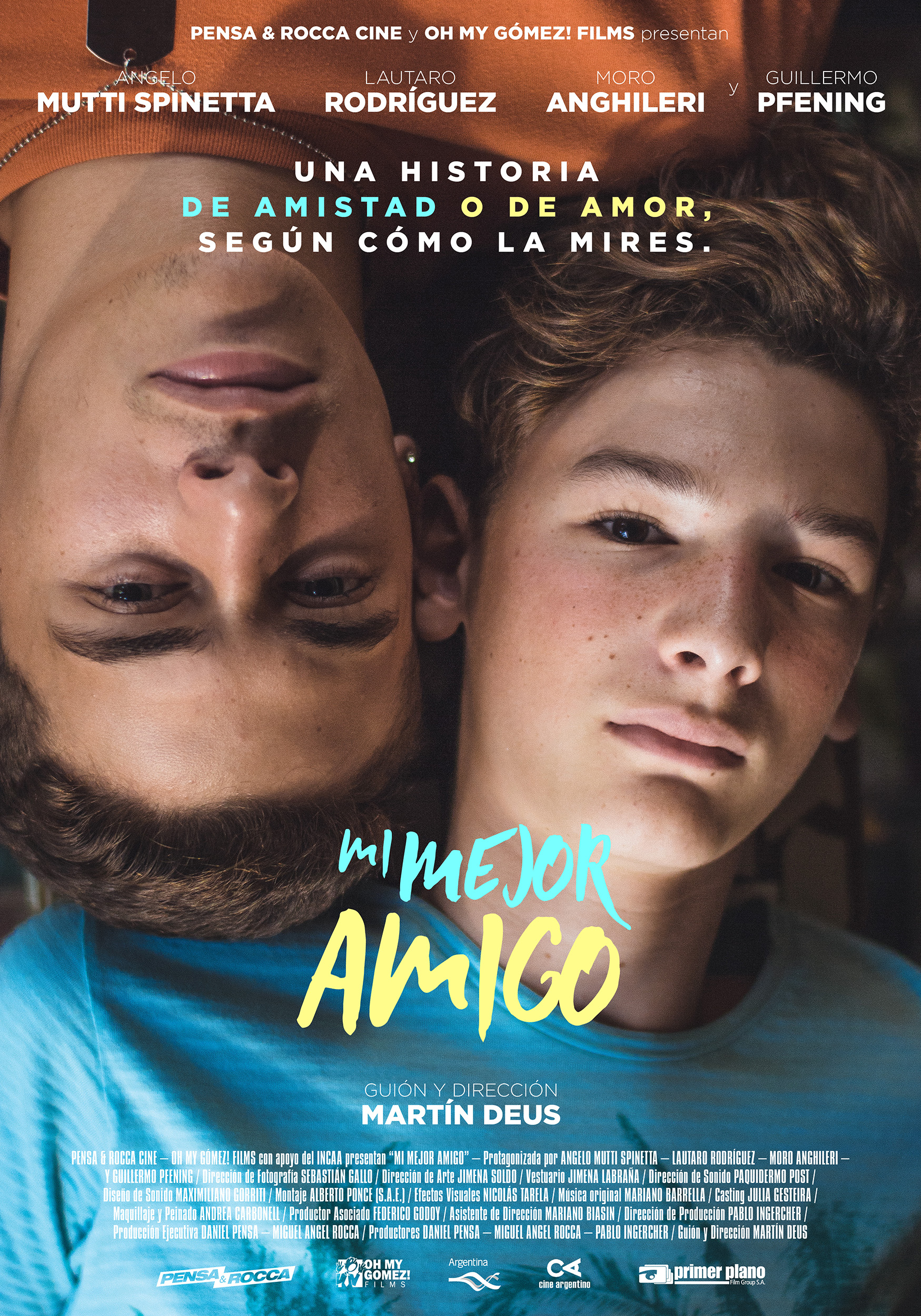
- Directed by: Martín Deus
- Written by: Martín Deus
- Produced by: Pensa&Rocca Cine; Oh My Gomez! Films
- Starring: Angelo Mutti Spinetta; Lautaro Rodríguez
- Cinematography: Sebastián Gallo
- Edited by: Alberto Ponce
- Music by: Mariano Barrella
- Release date: November 8, 2018
- Running time: 91 minutes
- Country: Argentina
- Language: Spanish

My Best Friend (Spanish: Mi mejor amigo) is an Argentinian film, written and directed by Martín Deus which was released on November 8, 2018. It stars Angelo Mutti Spinetta and Lautaro Rodríguez.

== Plot ==
Lorenzo (Angelo Mutti Spinetta), a teenager who lives in Patagonia, receives Caíto (Lautaro Rodríguez), the son of some friends of the family who are going through a serious situation and cannot take care of him. Caíto is a troubled young man who has difficulty adapting. In spite of the differences they have a peculiar friendship, where each one learns a lot from the other. One day Caíto tells him the real reason why he had to leave his house. From then on, Lorenzo will have to take charge of a secret too heavy to carry.

== Cast ==
- Angelo Mutti Spinetta - Lorenzo
- Lautaro Rodríguez - Caíto
- Guillermo Pfening - Andrés
- Mariana Anghileri - Camila
- Benito Mutti Spinetta - Lucas

== Accolades ==
=== Participations ===
- 2018 — Roze Filmdagen | Amsterdam LGBTQ Filmfestival (opening night)
- OUTshine Film Festival, Miami
- 33 Lovers Film Festival, Torino
- Puerto Rico Queer Film Fest
- Cine Las Américas International Film Festival, Austin
- Cannes Écrans Juniors 2018 (Won first place)
- Frameline 42, San Francisco
- OutFilm, 31st Connecticut LGBT Film Festival
- San Sebastián Film Festival 2018: Best Film Nominated
