= Candela Peña =

Spanish actress

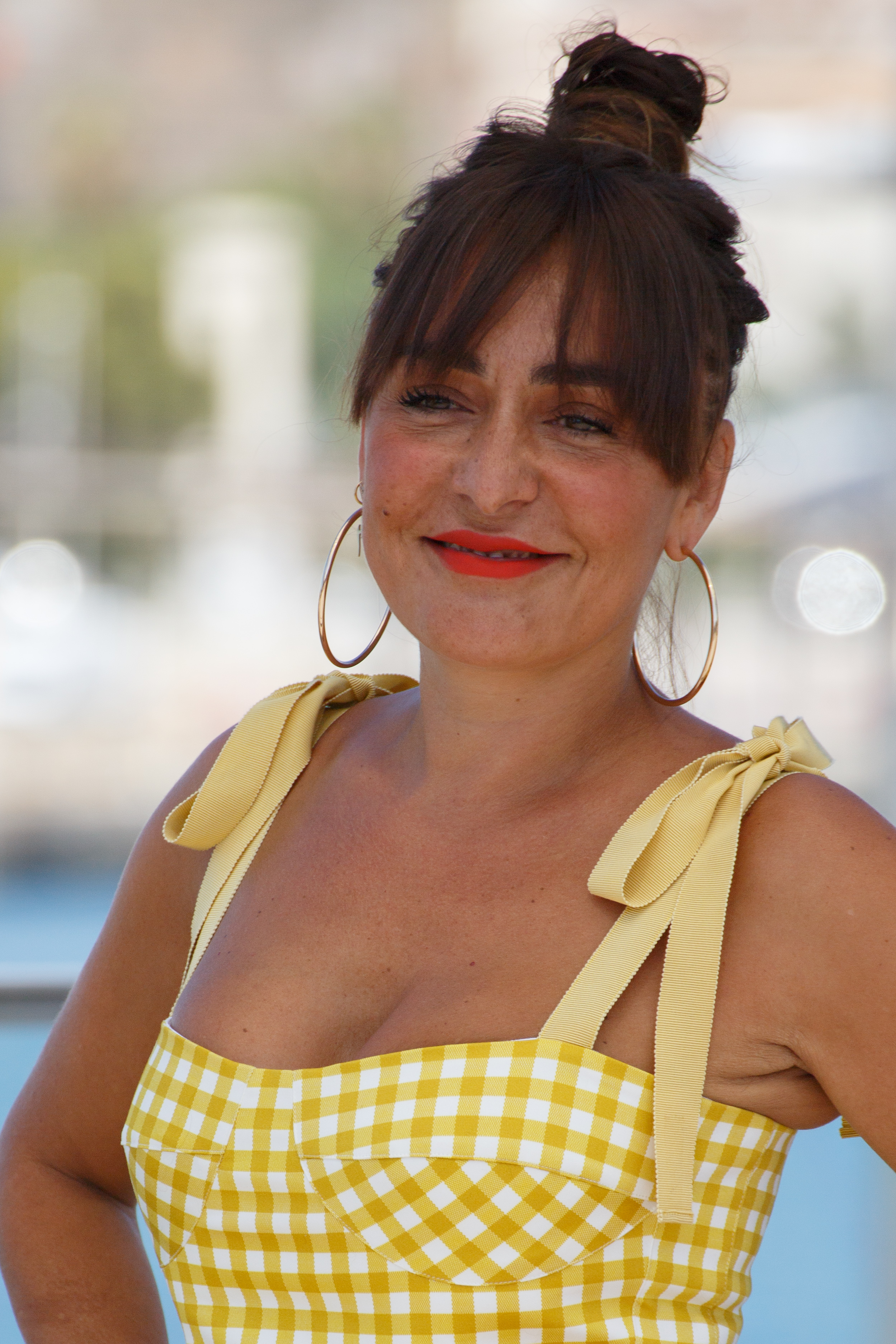
- Peña at the 2020 Malaga Film Festival
- Born: María del Pilar Peña Sánchez; 14 July 1973 (age 52); Gavà, Catalonia, Spain
- Occupation: Actress
- Years active: 1994–present

María del Pilar Peña Sánchez (born 14 July 1973), professionally known as Candela Peña, is a Spanish actress. Since her film debut in the 1994 thriller Running Out of Time, she has had a lengthy film career. She won the Goya Award for Best Actress for her performance in Princesses (2005) whereas she won the Goya Award for Best Supporting Actress for Take My Eyes (2003) and A Gun in Each Hand (2012).

== Biography ==
María del Pilar Peña Sánchez (her real name; she took the artistic name of Candela reportedly upon joining the theatre school), was born on 14 July 1973 in Gavà, province of Barcelona, daughter to a mother from Murcia and a father from Lora del Río who had a bar in Barcelona.

When she was four years old she started to learn dance in the city and after finishing high-school she went to Seville to begin theatre classes there and eventually in Madrid.

She made her first television appearance in the TV3 show Sputnik, making her film debut with a performance in the 1994 thriller Running Out of Time, which earned her two Goya Award nominations (New Actress and Supporting Actress).

Encouraged by Pedro Almodóvar, she published the novel Pérez Príncipe, María Dolores in 2001.

She won the Goya Award in 2003 (for the movie Te doy mis ojos) after being nominated several times previously.

In 2026, after a 6-year period with no meaningful role in any feature film, Peña starred in The Marked Woman.

== Filmography ==
=== Film ===
Year	Title	Role	Notes	Ref.
1994	Días contados (Running Out of Time)	Vanesa		
1995	Boca a boca (Mouth to Mouth)	Tanya		
1995	Hola, ¿estás sola? (Hi, Are You Alone?)	Trini		
1996	La Celestina	Elicia		
1997	¿De qué se ríen las mujeres?	Graci		
1998	Insomnio (Sleepless in Madrid)	Alba		
1999	Novios (Couples)	Cristal		
1999	Todo sobre mi madre (All About My Mother)	Nina Cruz		
2001	Sin vergüenza (No Shame)	Cecilia		
2001	Desaliñada			
2002	No somos nadie (God Is On Air)	Espe		
2003	Te doy mis ojos (Take My Eyes)	Ana		
2003	Descongélate! (Chill Out!)	Iris		
2003	Torremolinos 73	Carmen		
2003	Los muertos van deprisa			
2004	¡Hay motivo!			
2005	Princesas (Princesses)	Caye		
2006	Després de la pluja			
2008	En el lado de la vida			
2008	El patio de mi cárcel (My Prison Yard)	Mar		
2008	Los años desnudos. Clasificada S (Rated R)	Sandra Valle		
2008	The Three Ages of the Crime			
2009	La isla interior (The Island Inside)	Coral		
2012	Una pistola en cada mano (A Gun in Each Hand)	Mamen		
2013	Ayer no termina nunca (Yesterday Never Ends)	C.		
2014	Le Dernier Coup de marteau (The Last Hammer Blow)	Maria		
2015	Las ovejas no pierden el tren (Sidetracked)	Sara		
2016	Kiki, el amor se hace (Kiki, Love to Love)	María Candelaria		
2017	Pieles (Skins)	Ana		
2019	Salir del ropero (So My Grandma's a Lesbian!)	Perla		
2020	La boda de Rosa (Rosa's Wedding)	Rosa		
2020	Black Beach	Ale		
2026	La desconocida (The Marked Woman)	Anna Ripoll		

=== Television ===
Year	Title	Role	Notes	Ref.
2019–21	Hierro	Candela Montes		
2021	Maricón perdido (Queer You Are)	Lucía, Roberto's mother		
2024	El caso Asunta (The Asunta Case)	Rosario Porto		
2025	Furia (Rage)	Nat		

== Accolades ==
Year	Award	Category	Work	Result	Ref.
1995	9th Goya Awards	Best Supporting Actress	Running Out of Time	Nominated	
1995	9th Goya Awards	Best New Actress	Running Out of Time	Nominated	
2000	14th Goya Awards	Best Supporting Actress	All About My Mother	Nominated	
2004	18th Goya Awards	Best Supporting Actress	Take My Eyes	Won	
2004	13th Actors and Actresses Union Awards	Best Film Actress in a Secondary Role	Take My Eyes	Won	
2006	20th Goya Awards	Best Actress	Princesses	Won	
2006	15th Actors and Actresses Union Awards	Best Film Actress in a Leading Role	Princesses	Won	
2013	68th CEC Medals	Best Supporting Actress	A Gun in Each Hand	Nominated	
2013	27th Goya Awards	Best Supporting Actress	A Gun in Each Hand	Won	
2013	22nd Actors and Actresses Union Awards	Best Film Actress in a Secondary Role	A Gun in Each Hand	Won	
2014	6th Gaudí Awards	Best Actress	Yesterday Never Ends	Nominated	
2017	31st Goya Awards	Best Supporting Actress	Kiki, Love to Love	Nominated	
2017	26th Actors and Actresses Union Awards	Best Film Actress in a Secondary Role	Kiki, Love to Love	Won	
2020	7th Feroz Awards	Best Main Actress in a Series	Hierro	Won	
2020	29th Actors and Actresses Union Awards	Best Television Actress in a Leading Role	Hierro	Won	
2021	13th Gaudí Awards	Best Actress	Rosa's Wedding	Won	
2021	76th CEC Medals	Best Actress	Rosa's Wedding	Won	
2021	35th Goya Awards	Best Actress	Rosa's Wedding	Nominated	
2021	8th Platino Awards	Best Actress	Rosa's Wedding	Won	
2022	9th Feroz Awards	Best Main Actress in a Series	Hierro	Nominated	
2022	30th Actors and Actresses Union Awards	Best Television Actress in a Leading Role	Hierro	Won	
2024	30th Forqué Awards	Best Actress in a Series	The Asunta Case	Nominated	
2025	26th Iris Awards	Best Actress	The Asunta Case	Won	
2025	12th Feroz Awards	Best Main Actress in a Series	The Asunta Case	Nominated	
2025	33rd Actors and Actresses Union Awards	Best Television Actress in a Leading Role	The Asunta Case	Won	
2025	12th Platino Awards	Best Actress in a Miniseries or TV Series	The Asunta Case	Won	
2025	31st Forqué Awards	Best Actress in a Series	Rage	Nominated	
2026	13th Feroz Awards	Best Main Actress in a Series	Rage	Nominated	
2026	27th Iris Awards	Best Actress	Rage	Nominated	
2026	34th Actors and Actresses Union Awards	Best Television Actress in a Secondary Role	Rage	Nominated	
2026	13th Platino Awards	Best Actress in a Miniseries or TV Series	Rage	Nominated	
