= El caballero del milagro =

El caballero del milagro, or El arrogante español, is a theater play by Spanish writer Lope de Vega. It was first written around the year 1593, and first published in the year 1621. The original name of the play is El caballero del milagro with the subtitle El arrogante español. Its subtitle later became the name by which the play was known during its representations throughout the twentieth century.

== Plot ==
The play takes place in Rome during the 16th century, under the reign of Charles V, and centers on the misadventures of the protagonist Luzmán.

== Selected performances ==
- Teatro Español (Madrid), Madrid, 1964
  - Director: Cayetano Luca de Tena
  - Starring: Armando Calvo, Carmen Bernardos, María Fernanda D'Ocón, Irene Gutiérrez Caba, Ricardo Merino
- Teatro Español (Madrid), Madrid, 1991
  - Director: Cayetano Luca de Tena
  - Starring: Joaquín Kremel, Natalia Dicenta, Luis Varela, Manuel Gallardo, María Jesús Sirvent, Félix Navarro, Luisa Armenteros, Antonio Vico, Vicente Haro, Pepón Nieto, Manuel Torremocha
