= I Have a House =

- Theatrical release poster
- Spanish: Tengo una casa
- Directed by: Mónica Laguna
- Screenplay by: Mónica Laguna
- Starring: Nancho Novo; Pedro Alonso; Silke; Ernesto Alterio
- Cinematography: Teo Delgado
- Edited by: Pablo Blanco
- Music by: Los Enemigos
- Production company: El Deseo
- Distributed by: Warner Española
- Release dates: May 1996 (Festimad); 13 September 1996 (Spain)
- Country: Spain
- Language: Spanish

I Have a House (Spanish: Tengo una casa) is a 1996 Spanish comedy film written and directed by Mónica Laguna (in her directorial debut feature). It stars Nancho Novo, Pedro Alonso, Silke, and Ernesto Alterio.

== Plot ==
Searching for a 1500, two young males (Nico and Ferrari) end up instead in a cabin in the forest owned by beleaguered radio broadcaster Bólido, who is preparing for suicide. Bólido's childhood acquaintance Kelly, a rude woman raised with her father in a filling station nearby, also comes into action.

== Cast ==
- Nancho Novo as Bólido
- Pedro Alonso as Ferrari
- Silke Hornillos as Kelly
- Ernesto Alterio as Nico
- Juan Díaz as Fino
- Ricardo Amador as Patas
- Santiago Segura as el guardia civil
- El Gran Wyoming as Max
- Eduardo MacGregor as padre de Kelly
- Ion Gabella as xamarero
- Lola Baldrich as Eva

== Production ==
Laguna developed the premise about the film while listening to the song "Tengo una casa" by the musical band Los Enemigos, that eventually participated in the score of the film, whose plot likewise concerns about a band follower.

The film is an El Deseo production. Laguna explained in an interview that the film was fully shot in the Sierra de Urbasa, near Alsasua, except for a fire scene that did not make the final cut.

== Release ==
For its premiere, the film made it to the film slate of the Madrid Independent Festival, "Festimad". It was released theatrically in Spain on 13 September 1996.

== Reception ==
Fernando Morales of El País recommended the film, deeming it to be "an honest comedy about a group of marginalized people sharing house, friendship love, and a drive for breaking with the past".

== See also ==
- List of Spanish films of 1996
