= Mujeres (TV series) =

- Genre: Dramedy; Sitcom
- Created by: Dunia Ayaso and Félix Sabroso
- Directed by: Dunia Ayaso and Félix Sabroso
- Country of origin: Spain
- Original language: Spanish
- No. of seasons: 1
- No. of episodes: 13

Production
- Running time: 63–70 min
- Production companies: El Deseo; Mediapro

Original release
- Network: La 2
- Release: 18 September – 14 December 2006

Mujeres (lit: "Women") is a Spanish dramedy television series created and directed by Dunia Ayaso and Félix Sabroso. It originally aired from September to December 2006 on La 2.

== Plot ==
The plot delves into the personal stories of three generations of women living in a Madrilenian lower-middle class neighborhood, inspired in Hortaleza.

== Cast ==
- Chiqui Fernández as Irene, a widowed woman in her 40s, responsible for the family business, a bakery.
- Teresa Lozano as Palmira, the grand mother, with incipient senile dementia.
- Carmen Ruiz as Julia, the eldest daughter returning to the family home after going bust.
- Inma Cuevas as Magda, a hung-up teenager.
- Bart Santana as Raúl.
- Gracia Olayo as Susana.
- Antonio Gil Martínez as Manuel.
- Marylin Torres as Belinda.
- Christian Esquivel as Bernardo / Gabriel.
- Víctor Clavijo as Nicolás.
- Aitor Merino as Jamie.
- Malena Gutiérrez as Mariana.
- Oriol Vila as Willy.

== Production and release ==
Produced by El Deseo together with Mediapro, it is the first and, as of 2018, the only television series produced by Pedro Almodóvar's production company. Slated to air on the TVE's flagship channel La 1, it eventually premiered on La 2 on 18 September 2006, a year after it was filmed. The series was created and directed by Dunia Ayaso and Félix Sabroso, who authored the screenplay together with Juan Flahn, José Ángel Esteban, Carlos López and Carmen Pombero. The series consisted of a single-season featuring 13 episodes, with a running time ranging from 63 to 70 minutes. The series broadcasting run ended on 14 December 2006.

Mujeres doubled the average prime time viewer ratings in La 2, received excellent critical reception, and the cast members earned several awards for their performances. RAI – Radiotelevisione italiana purchased the broadcasting rights for Italy.

== Awards and nominations ==
Year	Award	Category	Nominees	Result	Ref.
2006	16th Actors and Actresses Union Awards	Best Lead Actress	Chiqui Fernández	Won	
2006	16th Actors and Actresses Union Awards	Best Secondary Actress	Inma Cuevas	Won	
2006	16th Actors and Actresses Union Awards	Best Secondary Actress	Teresa Lozano	Nominated	
2006	16th Actors and Actresses Union Awards	Best Supporting Actress	Gracia Olayo	Won	
2006	16th Actors and Actresses Union Awards	Best Supporting Actor	Víctor Clavijo	Won	
2007	57th Fotogramas de Plata	Best Television Actress	Chiqui Fernández	Won	
