= Bárbara Álvarez =

Uruguayan film cinematographer

Barbara Alvarez
- Born: January 3 1970; Montevideo, Uruguay
- Citizenship: Uruguay
- Education: Catholic University of Uruguay
- Occupation: Cinematographer
- Website: https://www.barbaraalvarez.net/

Barbara Alvarez is a Uruguayan cinematographer.

Born January the 3rd, 1970 in Montevideo, Uruguay. From 1988 to 1991 pursued the career of Communication Sciences at the Catholic University of Uruguay. During the same period also attended courses of appreciation of photography, press photography and Introduction to Filmmaking. In 1991 began to work as a camera assistant for several Production Companies in Montevideo. In 1997 attended the course of Cinematography II at the International Film and Television School of San Antonio de los Baños EICTV, Cuba, given by Raúl Rodriguez DP.

From 1995 worked as a Director of Photography in tv spots, music videos, documentaries, short and feature films. Some of these works were made in Uruguay, Argentina, Brazil, Chile, Colombia, Bolivia, Venezuela, Mexico, Peru, Haiti, and Denmark.

Member of the Academy of Motion Picture Arts and Sciences (AMPAS) since 2016.

== Filmography ==
- 25 watts, 2001

- Whisky, 2004

- El Custodio, 2006

- The Headless Woman, 2008

- From Thursday til Sunday, 2012

- Dog Flesh, 2012

- The Second Mother, 2015

- Don’t Call Me Son, 2016

- Jesús, 2016

- The Fever, 2019

- El Prófugo, 2020

- Utama, 2022
