= Excuse Me Darling, but Lucas Loved Me =

- Spanish: Perdona bonita, pero Lucas me quería a mí
- Directed by: Félix Sabroso Dunia Ayaso
- Written by: Félix Sabroso; Dunia Ayaso
- Starring: Jordi Mollá; Pepón Nieto; Roberto Correcher; Lucina Gil; Alonso Caparrós; María Pujalte; Gracia Olayo; Ferrán Rañé; Esperanza Roy
- Cinematography: Arnaldo Catinari
- Edited by: Miguel Ángel Santamaría
- Music by: Manuel Villalta
- Production companies: Sogetel; Cristal PC
- Distributed by: Columbia TriStar Films de España
- Release date: 30 January 1997
- Running time: 92 minutes
- Country: Spain
- Language: Spanish

Excuse Me Darling, but Lucas Loved Me (Spanish: Perdona bonita, pero Lucas me quería a mí) is a 1997 Spanish comedy film directed by Dunia Ayaso and Félix Sabroso in 1997. The film is an ensemble comedy in which the characters exhibited extreme stereotypes, causing some criticism that it exaggerated gay characters, to which the directors responded that heterosexual characters were also exaggerated and based on clichés.

== Synopsis ==
Until Lucas appeared in their lives, Dani, Carlos, and Toni led a quiet existence without major concerns. They shared almost everything: the house, housework, dogs, their homosexuality, and debts. The debts finally forced them to rent one of the bedrooms of their apartment. Lucas moved in with his long hair, his charming smile, and his muscular body to completely change the life and direction of their home. Lucas turned up dead but ... Who killed him? All had reasons for doing so, or maybe not.

== Cast ==
- Alonso Caparrós as Lucas
- Jordi Mollà as Toni
- Pepón Nieto as Carlos
- Roberto Correcher as Dani
- Gracia Olayo as Estrella
- Esperanza Roy as Juliana
- Ferran Rañé as Miguel
- Lucina Gil as Clara
- María Pujalte as Mari Carmen
- Concha Cortés as Catherine
- Mariola Fuentes as Tere

== See also ==
- List of Spanish films of 1997
