= Shoot Out (1998 film) =

- Spanish: El grito en el cielo
- Directed by: Félix Sabroso Dunia Ayaso
- Written by: Félix Sabroso; Dunia Ayaso
- Produced by: César Benítez
- Starring: María Conchita Alonso; Loles León; María Pujalte; Daniel Guzmán; Pepón Nieto; María Adánez; Carmen Balagué; Gracia Olayo; Mariola Fuentes; Malena Gutiérrez; Antonia San Juan; Ángel Burgos; Javivi; Miguel Ángel Tobías; Ana Torrent; Tito Valverde
- Cinematography: Hans Burmann
- Edited by: Miguel Ángel Santamaría
- Music by: Manuel Villalta
- Production companies: Cristal PC; Sogetel
- Distributed by: Columbia TriStar Films de España
- Release date: 24 April 1998
- Country: Spain
- Language: Spanish

Shoot Out (Spanish: El grito en el cielo) is a 1998 Spanish comedy film written and directed by Félix Sabroso and Dunia Ayaso starring María Conchita Alonso.

== Plot ==
Television host and diva Miranda Vega experiences a mental breakdown as a television executive tweaks her show introducing no-name freaks in the studio amid dwindling audience ratings, her husband's cheating, and the manoeuvres of her nemesis, Lesbian actress Marta Peña.

== Cast ==
- María Conchita Alonso as Miranda Vega
- Loles León as Marta Peña
- María Pujalte as Rita
- Ana Torrent as Yoli
- Daniel Guzmán as Salva
- Pepón Nieto as Paco
- María Adánez as Chus
- Carmen Balagué as Merche
- Malena Gutiérrez as Soraya
- Tito Valverde
- Javivi
- Miguel Ángel Tobías as Íñigo
- Mariola Fuentes
- Antonia San Juan

== Production ==
The film was produced by Cristal PC and Sogetel and it had the association of Canal+ and Sogepaq. It boasted a 300 million budget.

== Release ==
Distributed by Columbia TriStar, Shoot Out was released theatrically in Spain on 24 April 1998.

== Reception ==
Augusto Martínez Torres of El País lamented that the film "is as cliché, unfunny and boring" as the show it attempts to parody.

Jonathan Holland of Variety described the film as a "high-camp, low-interest and phenomenally unsubtle take on the mores of contemporary TV".

== See also ==
- List of Spanish films of 1998
