= The Marked Woman (2026 film) =

Upcoming film

- Promotional release poster
- Spanish: La desconocida
- Directed by: Gabe Ibáñez
- Screenplay by: Lara Sendim
- Based on: La desconocida by Rosa Montero and Olivier Truc
- Starring: Ana Rujas; Candela Peña; Pol Lópeẓ
- Cinematography: Bernat Bosch
- Edited by: Nacho Ruiz Capillas
- Music by: Fernando Velázquez
- Production companies: K&S Films
- Distributed by: Tripictures
- Release date: 29 May 2026
- Country: Spain
- Language: Spanish

The Marked Woman (Spanish: La desconocida) is a 2026 thriller film directed by Gabe Ibáñez and written by Lara Sendim based on the novel by Rosa Montero and Olivier Truc. It stars Ana Rujas alongside Candela Peña and Pol López.

It received a limited theatrical release in Spain by Tripictures on 29 May 2026 ahead of its 5 June 2026 streaming debut on Netflix.

== Plot ==
The plot is set in between Barcelona and Algeciras. Found by a security guard in a container of the Port of Barcelona, a woman unable to recall her identity is taken to a hospital, where an attempt is made on her life. Police sergeant Anna Ripoll and corporal Quique Zárate take over the investigation.

== Cast ==
- Ana Rujas as 'la desconocida'
- Candela Peña as Anna Ripoll
- Pol López as Quique Zárate
- Manolo Solo as Leo Falcó
- Kira Miró as Lucía

== Production ==
Netflix disclosed the project along a slate of other future films at an industry gathering during the 72nd San Sebastián International Film Festival in September 2024. Back then, it was set to be directed by Eva Vives. Adapted by Lara Sendim, La desconocida is based on the novel La desconocida (Alfaguara & Points, 2023) by Rosa Montero and Olivier Truc. The film is a K&S Films production for Netflix. Filming in Algeciras was reported to have begun on 27 May 2025 by local media, with Gabriel Ibáñez Rodrigo assuming direction duties. Shooting locations in the city included Llano Amarillo and El Rinconcillo. On 2 June 2025, Netflix formally announced the beginning of filming and the cast.

== Release ==
Tripictures is scheduled to theatrically release the film in Spain on 29 May 2026. Netflix is set to release the film on 5 June 2026.

== See also ==
- List of Spanish films of 2026
