= Rated R (film) =

- Theatrical release poster
- Spanish: Los años desnudos. Clasificada S
- Directed by: Félix Sabroso Dunia Ayaso
- Screenplay by: Félix Sabroso; Dunia Ayaso
- Starring: Candela Peña; Mar Flores; Goya Toledo
- Cinematography: David Azcano
- Edited by: Ascen Marchena
- Music by: Lucio Godoy
- Production companies: The Little Jiraffe; Antena 3 Films
- Distributed by: Universal Pictures International Spain
- Release date: 24 October 2008
- Country: Spain
- Language: Spanish

Rated R (Spanish: Los años desnudos. Clasificada S) is a 2008 Spanish film directed and written by Félix Sabroso and Dunia Ayaso which stars Candela Peña, Mar Flores, and Goya Toledo.

== Plot ==
The plot, starting in Madrid in 1975, follows Sandra, Lina and Eva, three actresses with different backgrounds working in Cine 'S' (erotic films) productions during the so-called Transition.

== Cast ==
- Candela Peña as Sandra Valle
- Goya Toledo as Lina Mora
- Mar Flores as Eva Millán
- Antonio de la Torre as Marcos
- Luis Zahera as Ángel
- Jorge Calvo as Tino
- Ana Wagener
- José Luis Torrijo

Susana Estrada features in a cameo.

== Production ==
The film was produced by The Little Jiraffe and Antena 3 Films and it had the participation of Antena 3.

== Release ==
Distributed by Universal Pictures International Spain, the film was theatrically released in Spain on 24 October 2008.

== Reception ==
Jonathan Holland of Variety deemed the film to be "an affectionate, if clumsy, X-ray of the period" [immediately after the death of dictator Franco] in which the sinking soap-opera-like final stretch is compensated by a trio of strong performances and "the sheer fascination of watching a decent portrayal of a society in transition".

Mirito Torreiro of Fotogramas rated the film 3 out of 5 stars, highlighting an "impeccable lead trio" as the best thing about the film, while citing an "improvable screenplay" as a negative point.

== See also ==
- List of Spanish films of 2008
