= Pepón Nieto =

Spanish actor (born 1967)

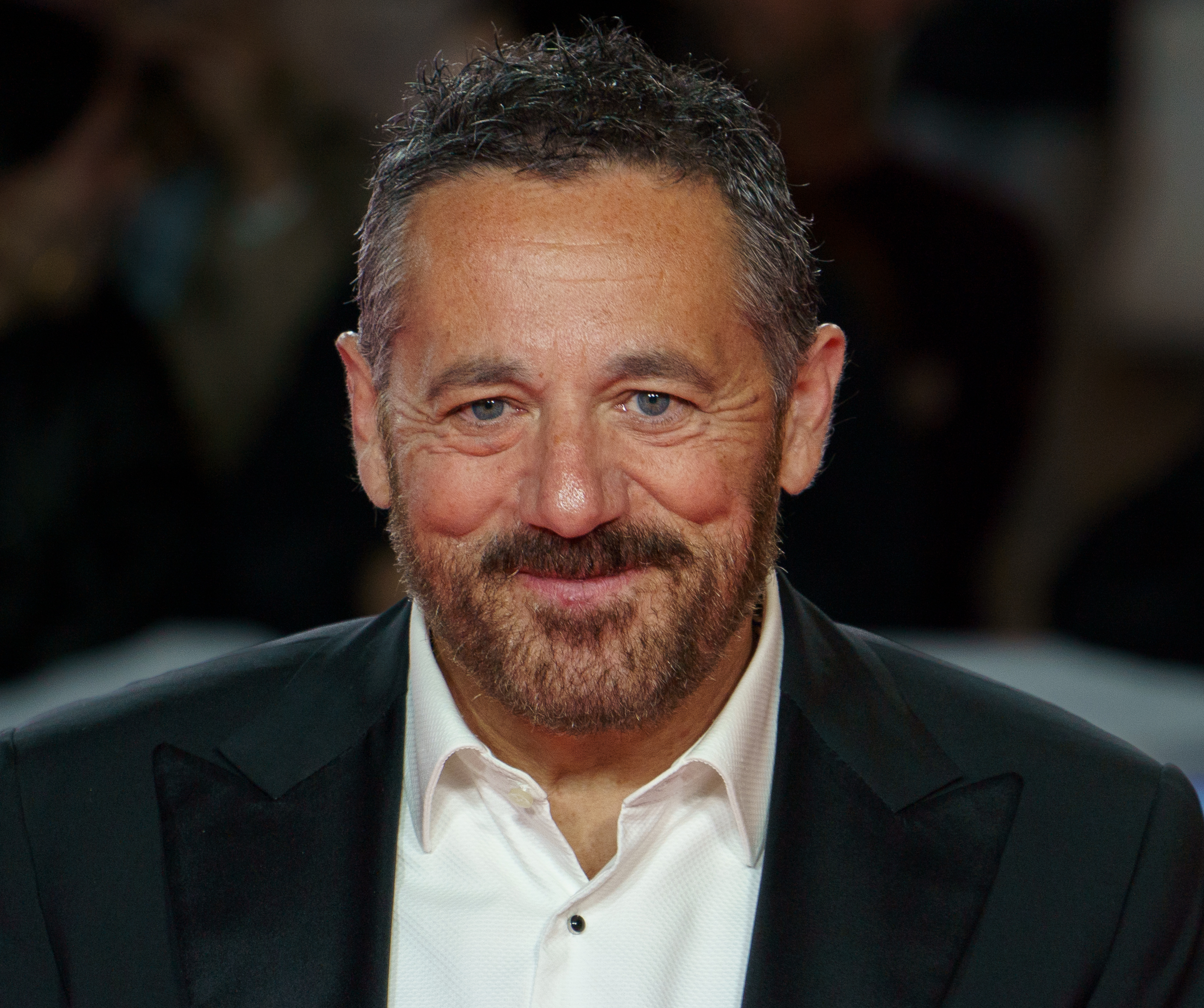
- Nieto in 2025
- Born: José Antonio Nieto Sánchez; 20 January 1967 (age 59); Marbella, Spain
- Occupation: Actor

José Antonio Nieto Sánchez, known professionally as Pepón Nieto (born 20 January 1967) is a Spanish actor.

He started his acting career in a 1993 episode of the Antena 3 TV series Farmacia de Guardia. He has appeared in other TV series: Periodistas, La vida de Rita and Los hombres de Paco.

He has also acted in theatre and films. He made his feature film debut in Running Out of Time (1994). He has performed in several Spanish theatre plays such as Las Mocedades del Cid, El caballero del milagro, Don Juan Tenorio and Le Dîner de cons.

== Personal life ==
Nieto publicly came out as gay in 2016.

== TV series ==
- Periodistas (1998–2002).
- La vida de Rita (2003).
- Los hombres de Paco (2005–2010; 2021).
- Sé quién eres (2017), as Inspector Giralt.
- 30 monedas (2020–)
- Smiley (2022–)
- love, inevitably (2023-) in Italian with subtitles
- The Final Problem (2026)

== Films ==
| Year | Title | Role | Notes | Ref. |
|---|---|---|---|---|
| 1994 | Días contados (Running Out of Time) | Ugarte | | |
| 1995 | Morirás en Chafarinas | | | |
| 1996 | Asunto interno | Pedro | | |
| 1997 | Suerte | Santos | | |
| 1997 | Perdona bonita, pero Lucas me quería a mí (Excuse Me Darling, but Lucas Loved Me) | Carlos | | |
| 1997 | El tiempo de la felicidad (Time of Happiness) | Cucho | | |
| 1997 | Cosas que dejé en La Habana (Things I Left in Havana) | Javier | | |
| 1998 | El grito en el cielo (Shoot Out) | Paco | | |
| 1998 | Los años bárbaros (The Stolen Years) | Velasco | | |
| 1999 | Pepe Guindo | El autor ('the author') | | |
| 2001 | Hombres felices | Hermano ('brother') | | |
| 2002 | La marcha verde | | | |
| 2003 | Los novios búlgaros (Bulgarian Lovers) | Gildo | | |
| 2003 | Descongélate! (Chill Out!) | Justo Santos | | |
| 2004 | È già ieri | | | |
| 2008 | Chuecatown (Boystown) | Leo | | |
| 2012 | Impávido (Poker Face) | Roge | | |
| 2013 | Las brujas de Zugarramurdi (Witching & Bitching) | Calvo | | |
| 2015 | Mi gran noche (My Big Night) | José | | |
| 2017 | Perfectos desconocidos (Perfect Strangers) | Pepe | | |
| 2022 | Mañana es hoy (Tomorrow Is Today) | Quique | | |

== Bibliography ==
- Benavent, Francisco María (2000). Cine español de los 90. Diccionario de películas, directores y temático (in Spanish). Bilbao: Ediciones Mensajero. ISBN 84-271-2326-4.
