= Julia Solomonoff =

Argentine film director, screenwriter, producer, and educator

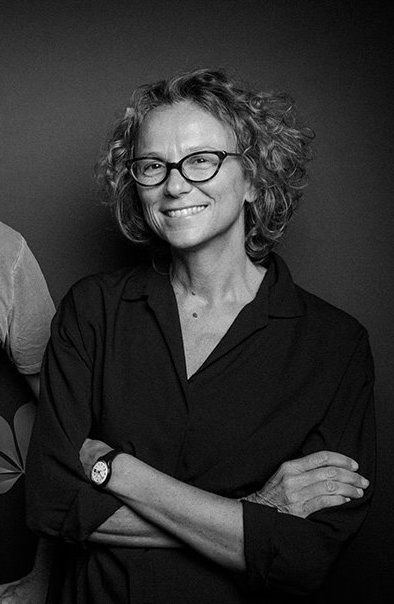
- Julia Solomonoff
- Born: March 4, 1968 (age 58); Rosario, Argentina
- Education: Columbia University School of the Arts
- Occupations: Film director; screenwriter; producer; educator
- Years active: 1992-present
- Notable work: The Last Summer of La Boyita, Nobody's Watching, Sisters

Julia Solomonoff is an Argentine film director, screenwriter, producer, and educator from Rosario, Argentina, based in New York City. Her work includes feature films, short films, documentary, and television. She is known for the feature films Sisters (2005), The Last Summer of La Boyita (2009), and Nobody's Watching (2017).

Solomonoff has also worked as a producer on films by Latin American directors, including Lucrecia Martel's Zama, Julia Murat's Pendular, Celina Murga's The Third Bank of the River, and Alejandro Landes's Cocalero. She is Head of Directing at the Graduate Film Program at New York University Tisch School of the Arts, where she served as Departmental Chair from 2021-2025.

== Early life and education ==
Solomonoff studied cinematography at the Argentine National School of Film, known as ENERC, and received an MFA in Film Directing from Columbia University School of the Arts, where she graduated with honors. She was a Fulbright Scholar and received a Milos Forman Grant and a Directors Guild of America award for Best Latinx Student Filmmaker.

== Career ==
=== Early work and short films ===
Solomonoff began directing short films in the 1990s. Her early works include Octavo 51 (1992), Un día con Ángela (1993), and Siesta (1998). Her short film Scratch (2003) screened at New Directors/New Films and received the Milos Forman Award.

=== Feature films ===
Solomonoff's first feature film, Sisters (Spanish: Hermanas), premiered at the Toronto International Film Festival in 2005. The film was developed through the Sundance Writers Lab and the Berlinale Talent Campus. The film was also Pedro Pascal's feature film debut. For Pascal's role, Solomonoff was looking for candidates with strong English-language skills. In addition to meeting this requirement, Pascal (then credited as Balmaceda) was found to be "someone with a very special face, very photogenic, with a kind of mystery" by Solomonoff.

Her second feature, The Last Summer of La Boyita (Spanish: El último verano de la Boyita), premiered at the San Sebastián International Film Festival in 2009. The film was produced by Pedro Almodóvar's company El Deseo and won more than twenty international awards. It is held in the permanent collection of the Museum of Modern Art.

In 2017, Solomonoff wrote and directed Nobody's Watching (Spanish: Nadie nos mira), starring Guillermo Pfening. Pfening won Best Actor at the Tribeca Festival for his performance in the film. The film opened theatrically at Film Forum in New York and was a New York Times and Village Voice Critics' Pick.

=== Television and documentary work ===
Solomonoff's television and documentary work includes The Suitor (2001), which aired on PBS, Chinchonfan (2003), Paraná, Biography of a River (2011), and Aerocene Pacha: A Sustainable Utopia (2020). Aerocene Pacha: A Sustainable Utopia was presented by the Goethe-Institut's Science Film Festival and credited Solomonoff as director.

She also directed work for the television series 15 a la Hora, also titled Minimum Wage, a Paramount Global Content series about three Latina immigrant cleaners working in Los Angeles.

=== Producing ===
As a producer, co-producer, associate producer, or executive producer, Solomonoff has worked on films including Cocalero, Everybody Has a Plan, The Third Bank of the River, A memória que me contam, Zama, Pendular, and The Illusion of an Everlasting Summer. Her producing credits include projects that screened at Sundance, Venice, Berlin, Toronto, and the New York Film Festival.

=== Teaching ===
Solomonoff has taught film directing at the graduate level and has held faculty and leadership positions at NYU Tisch School of the Arts. In 2021, NYU Tisch announced that she would become Chair of the Graduate Film Department, effective in the Fall 2021 semester. She is currently Head of Directing in the Graduate Film Program at Tisch.

Before returning to NYU, Solomonoff was a distinguished lecturer and head of the Directing Program at Brooklyn College's Feirstein Graduate School of Cinema.

== Filmography ==
=== As director and writer ===
Year	Title	Type	Credited role	Notes
1992	Octavo 51	Short film	Writer, director, producer	
1993	Un día con Ángela	Short film	Writer, director, producer	Part of Historias Breves
1998	Siesta	Short film	Writer, director, producer	DGA Directing Award: Latino Student.
2001	The Suitor	Television film	Writer, director	Aired on PBS
2003	Scratch	Short film	Writer, director, producer	Screened at New Directors/New Films
2003	Chinchonfan	Television / mockumentary	Director	
2005	Sisters / Hermanas	Feature film	Writer, director, producer	Premiered at the Toronto International Film Festival
2005	Ahora	Short film	Writer, director, producer	
2009	The Last Summer of La Boyita / El último verano de la Boyita	Feature film	Writer, director, producer	Premiered at the San Sebastián International Film Festival
2011	Paraná, Biography of a River	Documentary series	Director	Canal Encuentro
2017	Nobody's Watching / Nadie nos mira	Feature film	Writer, director, co-producer	Winner of Best Actor at the Tribeca Festival
2020	Aerocene Pacha: A Sustainable Utopia	Documentary series	Director	Canal Encuentro
2021	Hand, Writing	Short film	Writer, director, producer	Presented by The Shed and Cont.ar
2021	Traces	Short film essay	Writer, director, producer	Commissioned by the Argentine Forensic Anthropology Team
2025	15 a la Hora / Minimum Wage	Television series	Director	Paramount Global Content series

=== As producer ===
Year	Title	Director	Credited role	Notes
2007	Cocalero	Alejandro Landes	Producer	Screened at Sundance
2012	Everybody Has a Plan	Ana Piterbarg	Associate producer	Screened at Toronto; starring Viggo Mortensen
2013	A memória que me contam	Lúcia Murat	Co-producer	FIPRESCI Award, Moscow Film Festival
2014	The Third Bank of the River	Celina Murga	Associate producer	Screened in the Berlinale official competition
2014	Earthship Ushuaia		Executive producer	Documentary
2017	Zama	Lucrecia Martel	Associate producer	Screened at Venice, Toronto, and New York Film Festival
2017	Pendular	Julia Murat	Co-producer	FIPRESCI Award, Berlinale Panorama
2026	The Illusion of an Everlasting Summer	Alessandra Sanguinetti	Producer	Feature documentary

== Awards and nominations ==
Year	Title	Award
1992	Octavo 51	Women in Film Award - Best Short Film
1993	Un día con Ángela	FIPRESCI Award
1998	Siesta	DGA Award - Best Latino Student Film
1998	Siesta	Regional Academy Award nomination
1998	Siesta	New Line Cinema Most Original Film
2003	Scratch	Milos Forman Award
2005	Ahora	Argentine Critics Association Award - Best Screenplay
2005	Hermanas	Sundance Writers Lab
2005	Hermanas	Toronto International Film Festival
2009	The Last Summer of La Boyita	Best Director at Málaga Film Festival
2009	The Last Summer of La Boyita	Jordan Alexander Ressler Screenwriting Award at Miami Film Festival
2009	The Last Summer of La Boyita	Best Director at Kerala International Film Festival
2017	Nobody's Watching	Best Actor at Tribeca Film Festival
2017	Nobody's Watching	Best Original Screenplay at the Cóndor Awards
2017	Nobody's Watching	Best Film at Ceará Film Festival
