= Chill Out! =

- Theatrical release poster
- Spanish: Descongélate!
- Directed by: Félix Sabroso; Dunia Ayaso
- Written by: Félix Sabroso; Dunia Ayaso
- Produced by: Agustín Almodóvar; Jaume Roures; Antón Reixa
- Starring: Pepón Nieto; Candela Peña; Loles León; Rubén Ochandiano
- Cinematography: Kiko de la Rica
- Edited by: José Salcedo
- Music by: Mariano Marín
- Production companies: El Deseo; Mediapro; Filmanova
- Distributed by: Warner Sogefilms
- Release dates: July 2003 (L'Alfàs del Pi); 22 August 2003 (Spain)
- Country: Spain
- Language: Spanish

Chill Out! (Spanish: Descongélate!) is a 2003 Spanish comedy film written and directed by Félix Sabroso and Dunia Ayaso which stars Pepón Nieto, Candela Peña, Loles León, and Rubén Ochandiano.

== Plot ==
Set in a multicultural neighborhood of Madrid, the plot follows struggling bit-part actor and impersonator Justo Santos, who is offered a lead role by film director Aitor, with the latter promptly dying from drug overdose, seemingly thwarting Justo and Justo's family (brother Berto, wife Iris, and mother Katy) yearnings to solve their dire economic hardships.

== Cast ==
- Pepón Nieto as Justo Santos
- Candela Peña as Iris
- Loles León as Katy
- Rubén Ochandiano as Berto
- Pilar Castro as Anita
- Óscar Jaenada as Aitor
- José Ángel Egido
- Roberta Marrero as Nona
- Carmen Machi

== Production ==
The film is an El Deseo, Mediapro, and Filmanova production, with the participation of Telemadrid, Canal+, and Antena 3.

== Release ==
The film screened at the 15th L'Alfàs del Pi Film Festival in July 2003. Distributed by Warner Sogefilms, it was released theatrically in Spain on 22 August 2003. It opened to a so-so €222,000 opening weekend gross at the domestic box office, but good word-of-mouth took it to €1.1 million after four weeks.

== Reception ==
Jonathan Holland of Variety considered that the helmers' disposable work in earlier films "settles down into something like maturity without losing its contempo edge, and first-rate performances discover unsuspected depths in the derivative, over-the-top plotline about people frantically trying to improve their lot".

Jennifer Green of ScreenDaily deemed to film to be a "a sharp yet ultimately gentle comedy".

== See also ==
- List of Spanish films of 2003
