= El Deseo =

Spanish film production company

El Deseo S.A.
- Company type: Privately held
- Industry: Film production
- Genre: drama film
- Founded: 1986
- Founder: Pedro Almodóvar; Agustín Almodóvar
- Headquarters: Madrid, Spain
- Website: http://www.eldeseo.es

El Deseo S.A. is a film production company founded by Pedro Almodóvar and his brother Agustín in 1986. The company has financed all the films directed by Pedro starting from The Law of Desire in 1987 but has also produced films by other directors, such as Álex de la Iglesia and Isabel Coixet.

The American Film Institute celebrated El Deseo's 25th anniversary in Los Angeles.

== Filmography ==
=== Film ===
- Law of Desire (1987)
- Women on the Verge of a Nervous Breakdown (1988)
- Tie Me Up! Tie Me Down! (1990)
- High Heels (1991)
- Acción mutante (1993)
- Kika (1993)
- The Flower of My Secret (1995)
- I Have a House (1996)
- Live Flesh (1997)
- Messieurs les enfants (1997)
- All About My Mother (1999)
- The Devil's Backbone (2001)
- Loco Fever (2001)
- Talk to Her (2002)
- Chill Out! (2003)
- My Life Without Me (2003)
- Bad Education (2004)
- The Holy Girl (2004)
- Volver (2006)
- The Headless Woman (2008)
- My Prison Yard (2008)
- Broken Embraces (2009)
- José and Pilar (2010)
- I'm So Excited (2013)
- Wild Tales (2014)
- The Clan (2015)
- Julieta (2016)
- Zama (2017)
- El Angel (2018)
- The Silence of Others (2018)
- Pain and Glory (2019)
- The Human Voice (2020)
- Parallel Mothers (2021)
- It Snows in Benidorm (2021)
- Strange Way of Life (2023)
- Ramón and Ramón (2024)
- The Room Next Door (2024)
- Bitter Christmas (2026)

=== Television ===
- Mujeres (2006)
- Mentiras pasajeras (TBD)
