= Dunia Ayaso and Félix Sabroso =

Spanish couple of film directors

Dunia Ayaso and Félix Sabroso are a Spanish couple from the Canary Islands who work as screenwriters and film directors.

They started with a theatre company and took some cinematography courses later. Sabroso worked as a television screenwriter and Ayaso made videos before their first movie, Fea. Dunia Ayaso died on 28 February 2014, age 53.

== Filmography ==
- Fea (1994)
- Perdona bonita, pero Lucas me quería a mí (Excuse Me Darling, But Lucas Loved Me) (1997)
- El grito en el cielo (Shout Out) (1998)
- Descongélate! (Chill Out!) (2003)
- Chuecatown (Boystown) (2007)
- Los años desnudos. Clasificada S (Rated R; The Naked Years: Classified 'S') (2008)
- La isla interior (The Island Inside) (2009)

== Television ==
- Quítate tú pa ponerme yo (Telecinco)
- Mujeres (TVE)
