= Mirela Balić =

Spanish actress

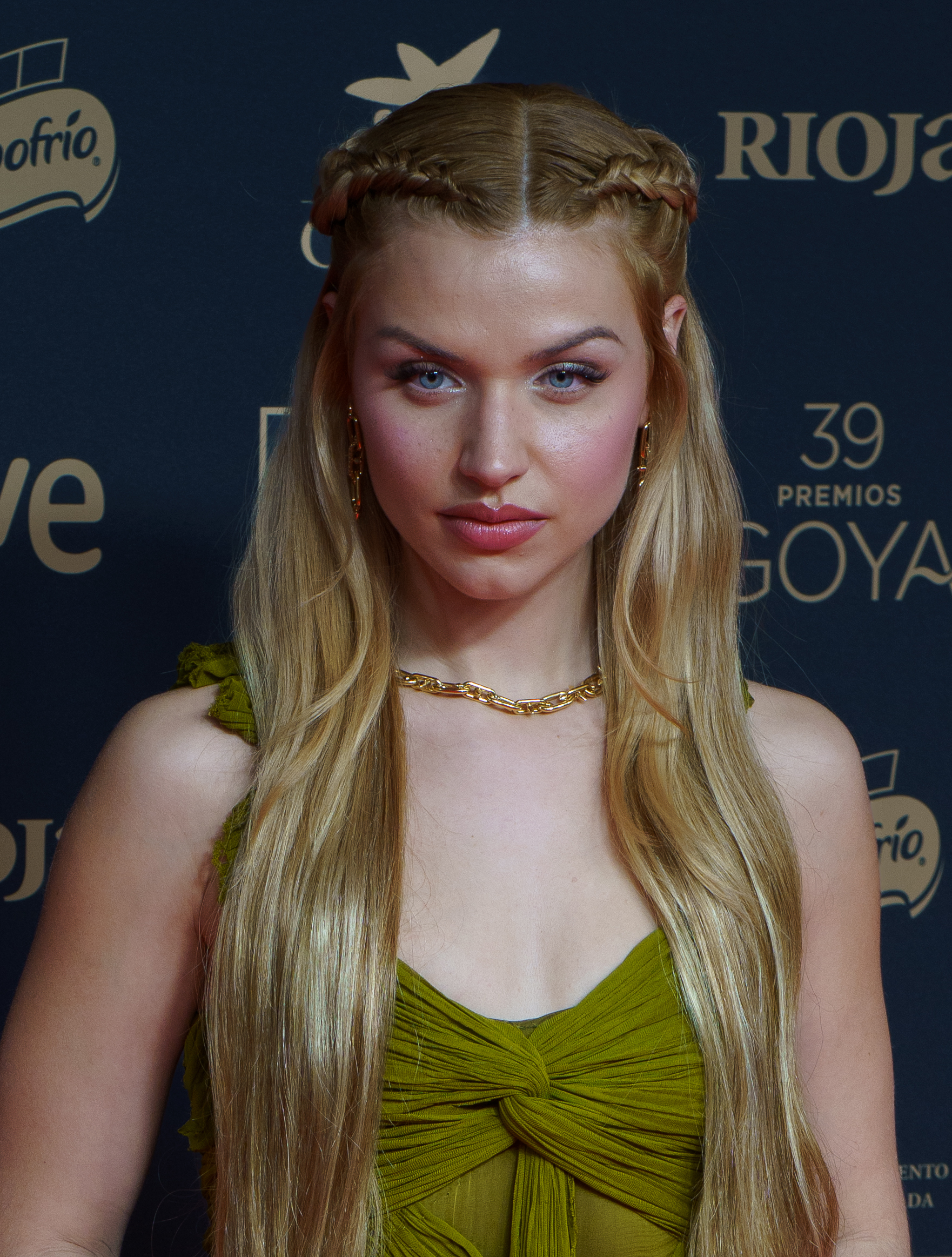
- Balić in 2025
- Born: 27 August 1999 (age 27); Madrid, Spain
- Education: RESAD
- Occupation: Actress

Mirela Balić Stefanović (born 27 August 1999) is an actress from Spain.

== Early life and education ==
Balić was born on 27 August 1999 in Madrid to a family of Serbian and Croatian background. Daughter to cellist Susana Stefanović, she received training as a cellist at the Conservatory Amaniel in Madrid, but decided to pursue an acting career and graduated in interpretación textual from the RESAD drama school.

She speaks 4 languages fluently, namely Spanish, Serbian, Croatian and English, while possessing a basic level of French.

== Career ==
After taking part in an episode of the television series Alba, Balić made her feature film debut in Code Name: Emperor (2022), playing the wife of a wealthy footballer.

She appeared in the biographical miniseries Untameable (2023), portraying Cata, a circus contortionist and Ángel Cristo's fling. Also in 2023, she featured in the thriller series You Would Do It Too, playing Leire, a reporter, starred alongside Andrea Ros and Tai Fati in the series Zorras, based on the novel by Noemí Casquet, and starred in the film Beach House.

She also joined season 7 of the Netflix teen drama series Elite to portray Chloe, a new student addicted to scandals and sex videos. In 2024, she featured in the tragicomedy series Un nuevo amanecer, and joined the cast of the film The Talent based on the novella Fräulein Else by Arthur Schnitzler, to portray Idoia, a friend of the protagonist. In 2025, she featured in Wattpad adaptation film Bad Influence playing Peyton, the protagonist's best friend.

== Filmography ==
=== Film ===
Year	Title	Role	Notes	Ref.
2022	Código Emperador (Code Name: Emperor)	Bramka	Feature film debut	
2023	Beach House	Sonia		
2025	Mala influencia (Bad Influence)	Peyton		
2025	El talento (The Talent)	Idoia		

=== Television ===
Year	Title	Role	Notes	Ref.
2021	Alba			
2023	Cristo y Rey (Untameable)	Cata		
2023	Tú también lo harías (You Would Do It Too)	Leyre Palacios		
2023	Zorras	Emily		
2023–24	Élite (Elite)	Chloe Ybarra Silva	Introduced in season 7	
2024	Un nuevo amanecer			
2026	Jazavac	Manuela Muñoz	Serbian series	
