= List of awards and nominations received by Nathalie Poza =

Nathalie Poza awards and nominations
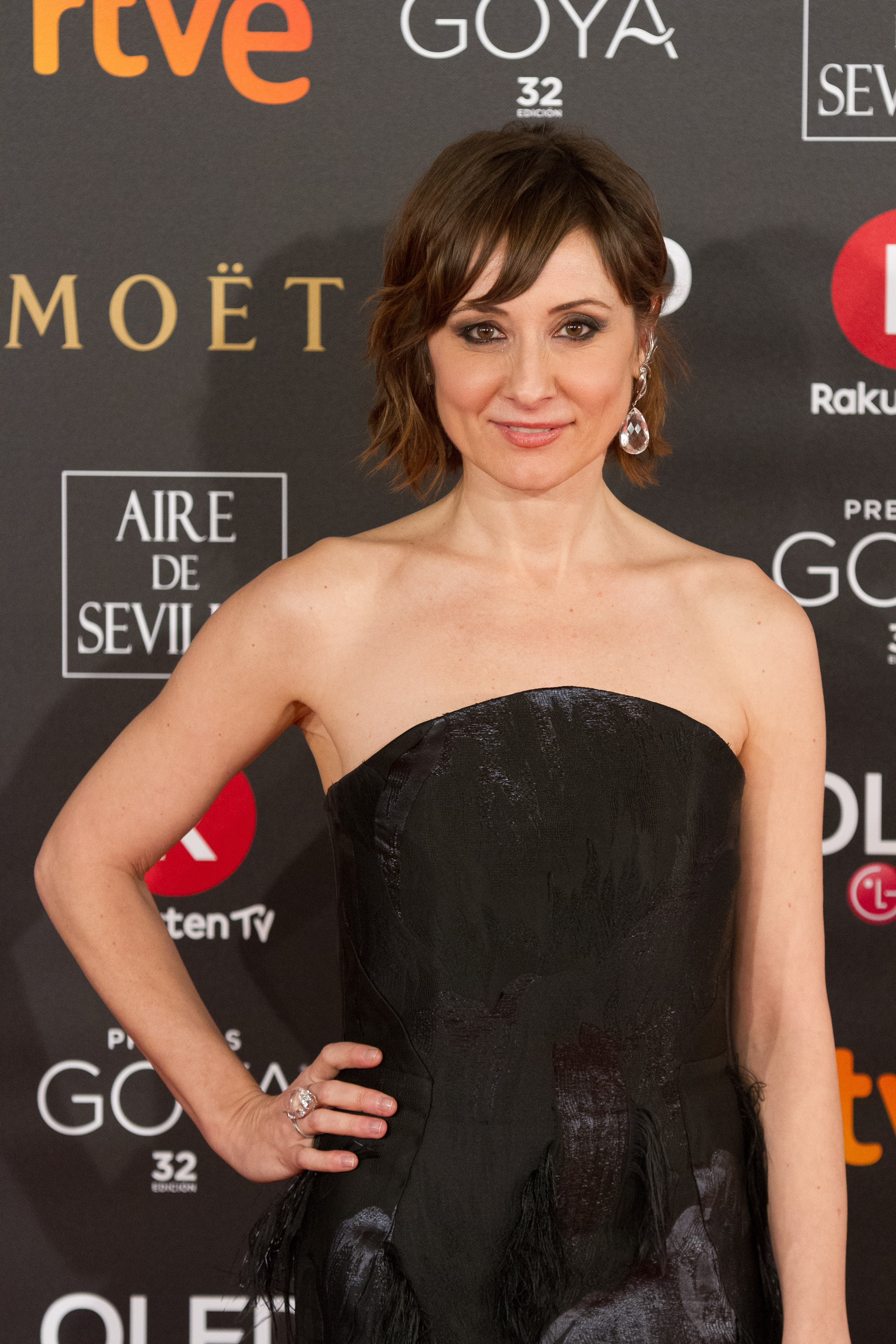
- Poza at the 2018 Goya Awards
Awards and nominations
| Award | Wins | Nominations |
| Goya Awards | 2 | 6 |
| Actors and Actresses Union Awards | 5 | 13 |
| Iris Awards | 0 | 2 |
| Talía Awards | 1 | 1 |

Spanish actress Nathalie Poza has received several awards including two Goya Awards, five Actors and Actresses Union Awards, and one Talía Award.

Poza won the Goya Award for Best Actress for her role as a woman addicted to alcohol, cocaine, and sex with strangers returning to her hometown in Lino Escalera's Can't Say Goodbye (2017). She won the Goya Award for Best Supporting Actress for her role as a high-ranking executive with a drinking problem in the Icíar Bollaín comedy drama Rosa's Wedding (2020).

She also won the Talía Award for Best Leading Actress for her portrayal of Blanche DuBois in A Streetcar Named Desire.

== Industry associations and guilds ==
=== Goya Awards ===
Goya Awards (Spain)
| Edition | Category | Nominated work | Result | Ref. |
|---|---|---|---|---|
| 18th (2004) | Best New Actress | Football Days | Nominated | |
| 20th (2006) | Best Actress | Hard Times | Nominated | |
| 28th (2014) | Best Supporting Actress | All the Women | Nominated | |
| 32nd (2018) | Best Actress | Can't Say Goodbye | Won | |
| 34th (2020) | Best Supporting Actress | While at War | Nominated | |
| 35th (2021) | Best Supporting Actress | Rosa's Wedding | Won | |

=== Iris Awards ===
Iris Awards (Spain)
| Edition | Category | Nominated work | Result | Ref. |
|---|---|---|---|---|
| 22nd (2021) | Best Actress | La unidad | Nominated | |
| 24th (2022) | Best Actress | La unidad | Won | |

=== Lola Gaos Awards ===
Lola Gaos Awards (Valencian Community)
| Edition | Category | Nominated work | Result | Ref. |
|---|---|---|---|---|
| 3rd (2020) | Best Supporting Actress | Rosa's Wedding | Nominated | |

=== Actors and Actresses Union Awards ===
Actors and Actresses Union Awards (Spain)
| Edition | Category | Nominated work | Result | Ref. |
|---|---|---|---|---|
| 13th (2004) | Best Film Actress in a Minor Role | Football Days | Nominated | |
| 13th (2004) | Best New Actress | Football Days | Won | |
| 15th (2006) | Best Film Actress in a Leading Role | Hard Times | Nominated | |
| 17th (2008) | Best Stage Actress in a Secondary Role | Marat Sade | Nominated | |
| 18th (2009) | Best Television Actress in a Leading Role | LEX | Nominated | |
| 19th (2010) | Best Stage Actress in a Secondary Role | Titus Andronicus | Won | |
| 25th (2016) | Best Television Actress in a Minor Role | Carlos, rey emperador | Nominated | |
| 26th (2017) | Best Film Actress in a Minor Role | Julieta | Nominated | |
| 27th (2018) | Best Film Actress in a Leading Role | Can't Say Goodbye | Won | |
| 29th (2020) | Best Film Actress in a Secondary Role | While at War | Won | |
| 30th (2022) | Best Stage Actress in a Leading Role | Prostitución | Nominated | |
| 31st (2023) | Best Television Actress in a Leading Role | La unidad | Won | |
| 34th (2026) | Best Stage Actress in a Leading Role | A Streetcar Named Desire | Nominated | |

=== Talía Awards ===
Talía Awards (Spain)
| Edition | Category | Nominated work | Result | Ref. |
|---|---|---|---|---|
| 4th (2026) | Best Leading Actress | A Streetcar Named Desire | Won | |

=== Platino Awards ===
Platino Awards (Ibero-America)
| Edition | Category | Nominated work | Result | Ref. |
|---|---|---|---|---|
| 8th (2021) | Best Supporting Actress | Rosa's Wedding | Won | |

=== Forqué Awards ===
Forqué Awards (Spain)
| Edition | Category | Nominated work | Result | Ref. |
|---|---|---|---|---|
| 23rd (2018) | Best Actress | Can't Say Goodbye | Won | |

== Critics and screen journalists' associations and circles ==
=== Feroz Awards ===
Feroz Awards (Spain)
| Edition | Category | Nominated work | Result | Ref. |
|---|---|---|---|---|
| 5th (2018) | Best Main Actress in a Film | Can't Say Goodbye | Won | |
| 8th (2021) | Best Supporting Actress in a Film | Rosa's Wedding | Nominated | |
| 10th (2023) | Best Main Actress in a Series | La unidad | Nominated | |

=== CEC Medals ===
CEC Medals (Spain)
| Edition | Category | Nominated work | Result | Ref. |
|---|---|---|---|---|
| 69th (2014) | Best Supporting Actress | All the Women | Nominated | |
| 73rd (2018) | Best Actress | Can't Say Goodbye | Won | |
| 76th (2021) | Best Supporting Actress | Rosa's Wedding | Won | |

== Competitive festival awards ==
=== Málaga Film Festival ===
Málaga Film Festival
| Edition | Category | Nominated work | Result | Ref. |
|---|---|---|---|---|
| 20th (2017) | Silver Biznaga for Best Actress | Can't Say Goodbye | Won | |
| 23rd (2020) | Silver Biznaga for Best Supporting Actress | Rosa's Wedding | Won | |
