= The Talent =

- Film poster
- Spanish: El talento
- Directed by: Polo Menárguez
- Written by: Fernando León de Aranoa; Polo Menárguez
- Based on: Fräulein Else by Arthur Schnitzler
- Produced by: Fernando León de Aranoa; Patricia de Muns; Laura Fdez. Espeso; Javier Méndez
- Starring: Ester Expósito; Pedro Casablanc; Mirela Balic; Juan Pablo Fuentes; Rocío Muñoz-Cobo; Sonia Almarcha
- Cinematography: Jose Rosete
- Edited by: Jaime Colis
- Music by: Carla F. Benedicto
- Production companies: Reposado; The Mediapro Studio; K2000
- Distributed by: Tripictures
- Release date: 5 September 2025
- Running time: 103 minutes
- Country: Spain
- Language: Spanish

The Talent (Spanish: El talento) is a 2025 Spanish drama film directed by Polo Menárguez, who co-wrote the screenplay with Fernando León de Aranoa, based on the 1924 novella Fräulein Else by Arthur Schnitzler. The cast is led by Ester Expósito and Pedro Casablanc.

== Plot ==
Cellist Elsa attends her friend Idoia's exclusive party. Upon receiving a call from her mother, she is forced to make a difficult choice.

== Cast ==
- Ester Expósito as Elsa
- Pedro Casablanc as Ignacio
- Mirela Balić as Idoia
- Rocío Muñoz Cobo
- Marta Aledo
- Juan Pablo Fuentes
- Itziar Manero
- Clara Sans
- Eva Martín
- Markel Sainz
- Diego Niski

== Production ==
The Talent is a Reposado PC (Fernando León de Aranoa and Patricia de Muns) and The Mediapro Studio (Laura Fernández Espeso and Javier Méndez) production, with the participation of RTVE, Movistar Plus+ and 3Cat. The start of filming in Biscay was announced in September 2024. Shooting locations included Leioa.

== Release ==
Film Factory acquired international sales rights to the film ahead of the 2025 European Film Market. The film is scheduled to be released theatrically in Spain by Tripictures on 5 September 2025.

== Accolades ==
Year	Award	Category	Nominee(s)	Result	Ref.
2026	40th Goya Awards	Best Original Score	Carla F. Benedicto	Nominated	

== See also ==
- List of Spanish films of 2025
