= Untameable =

Spanish biopic miniseries

- Release poster
- Spanish: Cristo y Rey
- Genre: Biographical; Drama
- Created by: Daniel Écija
- Directed by: David Molina; Manu Gómez
- Starring: Jaime Lorente; Belén Cuesta
- Country of origin: Spain
- Original language: Spanish
- No. of episodes: 8

Production
- Executive producers: Montse García; Daniel Écija
- Production companies: Atresmedia TV; Good Mood

Original release
- Network: Atresplayer Premium
- Release: 15 January – 26 February 2023

Untameable (Spanish: Cristo y Rey, lit. 'Cristo and Rey') is a Spanish biopic miniseries created by Daniel Écija starring Jaime Lorente and Belén Cuesta respectively as circus tamer Ángel Cristo and actress Bárbara Rey. It is produced by Good Mood for Atresmedia.

== Plot ==
The plot follows the toxic relationship between circus tamer Ángel Cristo and actress and destape icon Bárbara Rey, which was very popular during the Transition and was mired behind the scenes by instances of drug use, infidelity, ludomania and domestic violence, while also covering the alleged affair of Rey with "a powerful statesman".

== Cast ==
- Jaime Lorente as Ángel Cristo
- Belén Cuesta as Bárbara Rey
- Adriana Torrebejano as Chelo García Cortés
- Cristóbal Suárez as Rey Juan Carlos
- Artur Busquets as Payasito
- José Milán as Blasco
- Chema Adeva as Cristóforo
- Belén Ponce de León as Margarita
- Vicente Vergara as Andrés
- Diana Peñalver as Salvadora
- Secun de la Rosa as Richardi
- Salomé Jiménez as Reina Sofía
- David Lorente as Paco Ostos
- Ana Carrasco as Hortensia
- Mirela Balić as Cata
- Antonio Buil as Mancuso
- Elvira Cuadrupani as Patri Veracruz
- Jesús Castro as Paquirri
- Clara Alvarado as Rocío Dúrcal
- Denis Gómez as José María Íñigo
- Dani Muriel as Manolo Escobar
- Julio Arnau as Matías Prats padre
- Julián Ortega as Jesús Mariñas
- Miriam Serrano as Betty Missiego
- Francis Lorenzo as Fernando Arias-Salgado

== Production and release ==
Jaime Lorente was disclosed to have been cast as Ángel Cristo in December 2021 while Belén Cuesta was disclosed to have been cast as Bárbara Rey in February 2022. On 11 May 2022, Atresmedia reported the beginning of shooting and disclosed a number of additional cast members (including the actors set to portray Juan Carlos and Sofia). The series will air both on Antena 3 and Atresplayer Premium. The writing team, coordinated by Andrés Martín Soto and Patricia Trueba, also featured, Daniel Écija, César Mendizábal, Iñaki San Román, and Ángel Gasco-Coloma. A 15 January 2023 premiere on Atresplayer Premium was scheduled.

== Episodes ==
No.	Title	Directed by	Written by	Original release date
1	"The Tamer's Skin" (La piel del domador)	David Molina Encinas	Daniel Écija, Andrés Martín Soto, Patricia Trueba, César Mendizábal, Iñaki San Román, Ángel Gasco-Coloma	15 January 2023
2	"They Don't Love Me" (No me quieren)	David Molina Encinas, Manu Gómez	Daniel Écija, Andrés Martín Soto, Patricia Trueba, César Mendizábal, Iñaki San Román	15 January 2023
3	"You Don't Dump a King" (A un rey no se le deja)	David Molina Encinas, Manu Gómez	Daniel Écija, Andrés Martín Soto, Patricia Trueba, César Mendizábal, Iñaki San Román	22 January 2023
4	"For Life" (Para toda la vida)	David Molina Encinas, Manu Gómez	Daniel Écija, Andrés Martín Soto, Patricia Trueba, César Mendizábal, Iñaki San Román	29 January 2023
5	"A Lioness in the Cage" (Una leona en la jaula)	David Molina Encinas, Manu Gómez	Daniel Écija, Andrés Martín Soto, Patricia Trueba, César Mendizábal, Iñaki San Román	5 February 2023
6	"The King's Whore" (La puta del rey)	David Molina Encinas, Manu Gómez	Daniel Écija, Andrés Martín Soto, Patricia Trueba, César Mendizábal, Iñaki San Román	12 February 2023
7	"A Night with Bárbara" (Una noche bárbara)	David Molina Encinas	Daniel Écija, Andrés Martín Soto, Patricia Trueba, César Mendizábal, Iñaki San Román	19 February 2023
8	"The Only Creature I Couldn't Tame" (La única fiera que no pude domar)	David Molina Encinas	Daniel Écija, Andrés Martín Soto, Patricia Trueba, César Mendizábal, Iñaki San Román	26 February 2023

== Accolades ==
Year	Award	Category	Nominee(s)	Result	Ref.
2024	25th Iris Awards	Best Actress	Belén Cuesta	Won	
2024	32nd Actors and Actresses Union Awards	Best Television Actor in a Secondary Role	Cristóbal Suárez	Won	
2024	32nd Actors and Actresses Union Awards	Best Television Actor in a Minor Role	Dani Muriel	Nominated	
