= Clara Alvarado =

Spanish actress and nurse (born 1990)

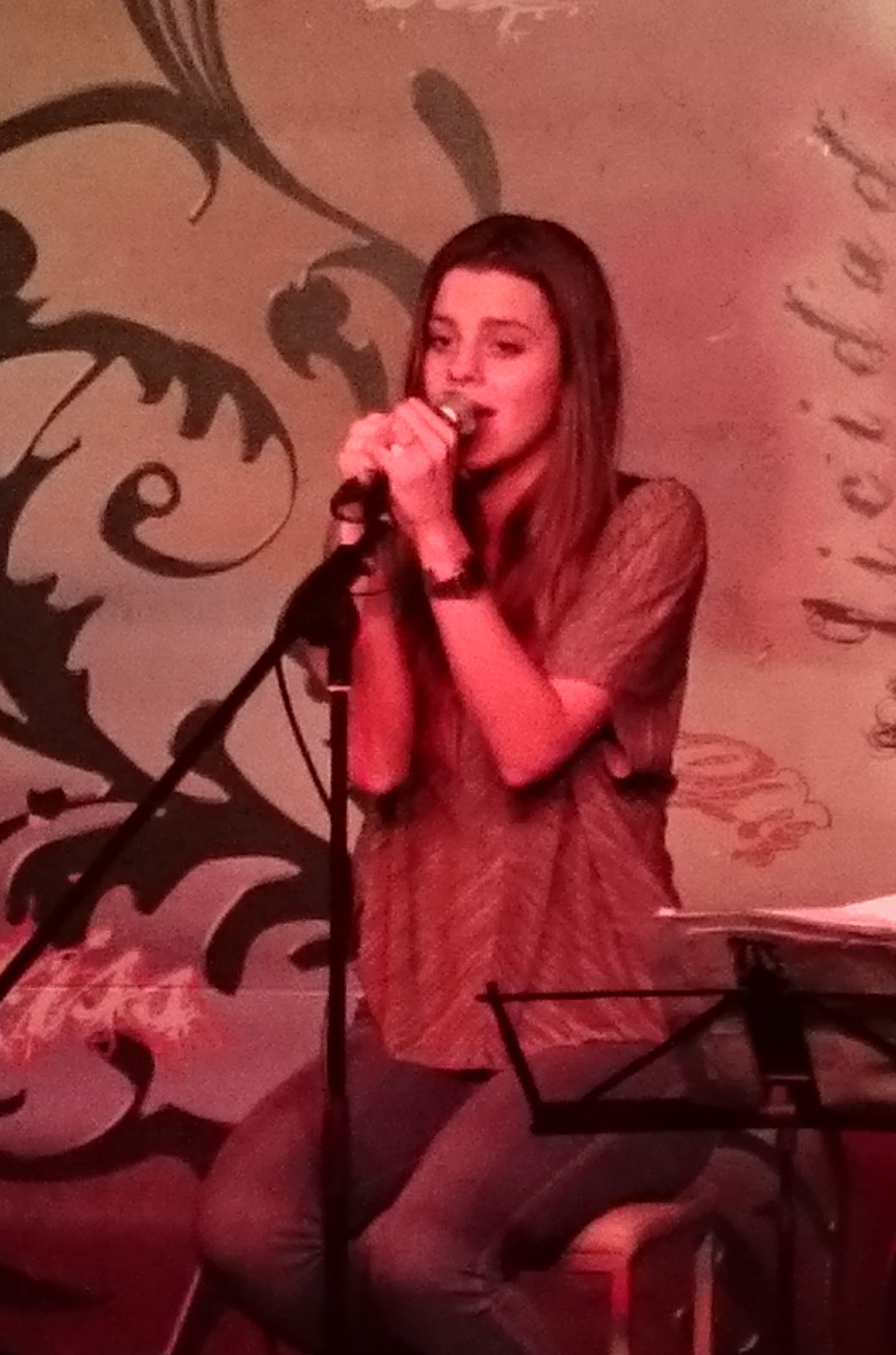
- Alvarado in 2016
- Born: Clara Alvarado Bermudo; July 2, 1990 (age 36); Navalmoral de la Mata, Spain
- Education: Complutense University of Madrid
- Occupations: Actress; singer; nurse
- Years active: 2011–present

Clara Alvarado Bermudo (born 2 July 1990) is a Spanish actress, singer and nurse. She became known for playing Ariadna Cascales in the first two parts of the crime series Money Heist (La casa de papel), returned to work as a nurse in March 2020 during the COVID-19 pandemic in Spain, and in 2023 played the singer Rocío Dúrcal in the biographical series Untameable (Cristo y Rey). She was a founder of the pop duo Biuti Bambú.

== Early life ==
Clara Alvarado Bermudo was born on 2 July 1990 in Navalmoral de la Mata, in the Province of Cáceres. Both her parents worked in healthcare, and from the age of eight she attended the local music school, where she studied clarinet and sang in the choir. She moved to Madrid to study nursing, and during the degree an offer to appear in a short film led her to acting. She made her film debut in the 2012 short Almohada.

== Career ==
=== Stage ===
After finishing a degree in dramatic art in 2013, Alvarado appeared in the musical Jekyll y Hyde. In August 2015 she played Íole in Hércules, el musical, directed by Ricard Reguant and staged at the Roman Theatre of Mérida during the city's classical theatre festival.

=== Television and film ===
Alvarado's early television work included a small role in Cuéntame cómo pasó and the part of Raquel, a new student, in the second season of the youth series Yo quisiera. She played Ariadna Cascales, one of the hostages, in the first two parts of Money Heist (La casa de papel), which reached a global audience through Netflix.

In 2023 she played the singer Rocío Dúrcal in Untameable (Cristo y Rey), the Atresplayer biographical series about Ángel Cristo and Bárbara Rey. Her episodes recreated the 1977 film Me siento extraña, in which Dúrcal and Rey played two women who fall in love, with Belén Cuesta as Rey.

In 2024 she joined the cast of La Moderna, the daily afternoon drama of La 1, as Mercedes Morel, the sister of César Morel, played by Miguel Ángel Muñoz.

== Nursing ==
Both of Alvarado's parents are nurses; she graduated in nursing from the Complutense University of Madrid in 2012 but never practised, and when the COVID-19 pandemic reached Spain she joined a small centre caring for elderly people in the Community of Madrid, where her work included palliative care.

She started on 25 March 2020, during the state of alarm declared over the coronavirus, and said she felt an ethical and moral duty to help at a time when protective equipment was scarce. She announced the decision on Instagram with a message to her father, a nurse who had just retired: "Tú te jubilas y yo me incorporo" ("You retire and I sign up"), and explained that nursing had always been her "plan B" but had become her "plan A". The job was the first time she had practised nursing; she said the aim of every shift was to go home feeling she had done all she could to improve her patients' health.

Days into the job she admitted she was afraid of infection: staff received one mask per day and she had bought her own surgical caps online. Her father, who had asthma, was proud of her decision. Alvarado remained in nursing for two and a half years, until September 2022.

== Music ==
Alvarado and Iciar Segovia formed the pop duo Biuti Bambú, a project they said was born on the rooftop of a concert among friends. They presented the group in February 2020 at the Café Comercial in Madrid, where the room was full, and they recorded their first single separately at home during the coronavirus lockdown; a second single followed in July 2020. At the time Alvarado was working eight-hour hospital shifts and gave her afternoons to the band. The duo, whose members described their sound as "pop fronterizo", released its first album in the winter of 2022–23 and presented it in Cáceres in April 2023.

== Awards ==
In 2016 Alvarado was one of the five finalists for the Actriz Revelación (breakthrough actress) award at the ninth Premios Teatro Musical, for her work in Hércules, el musical. In 2019 she received the individual Tenca de Oro at the Fiesta de la Tenca in Aliseda (Cáceres). In 2023, at the 30th Festival de Cine Español de Cáceres, she received the Premio Reyes Abades, which the festival gives to a person from Extremadura with a distinguished film career. In December 2025 she won the actress award at the first Premios Woman Extremadura, presented at the Palacio de Congresos in Mérida.

== Filmography ==
=== Film ===
Year	Title	Notes
2012	Almohada	Short film

=== Television ===
Year	Title	Role
2011	Cuéntame cómo pasó	
2017	Money Heist	Ariadna Cascales
2018	Yo quisiera	Raquel
2023	Untameable	Rocío Dúrcal
2024–2025	La Moderna	Mercedes Morel

=== Stage ===
Year	Title	Role
2015	Jekyll y Hyde	
2015	Hércules, el musical	Íole
