= Nathalie Poza =

Spanish actress

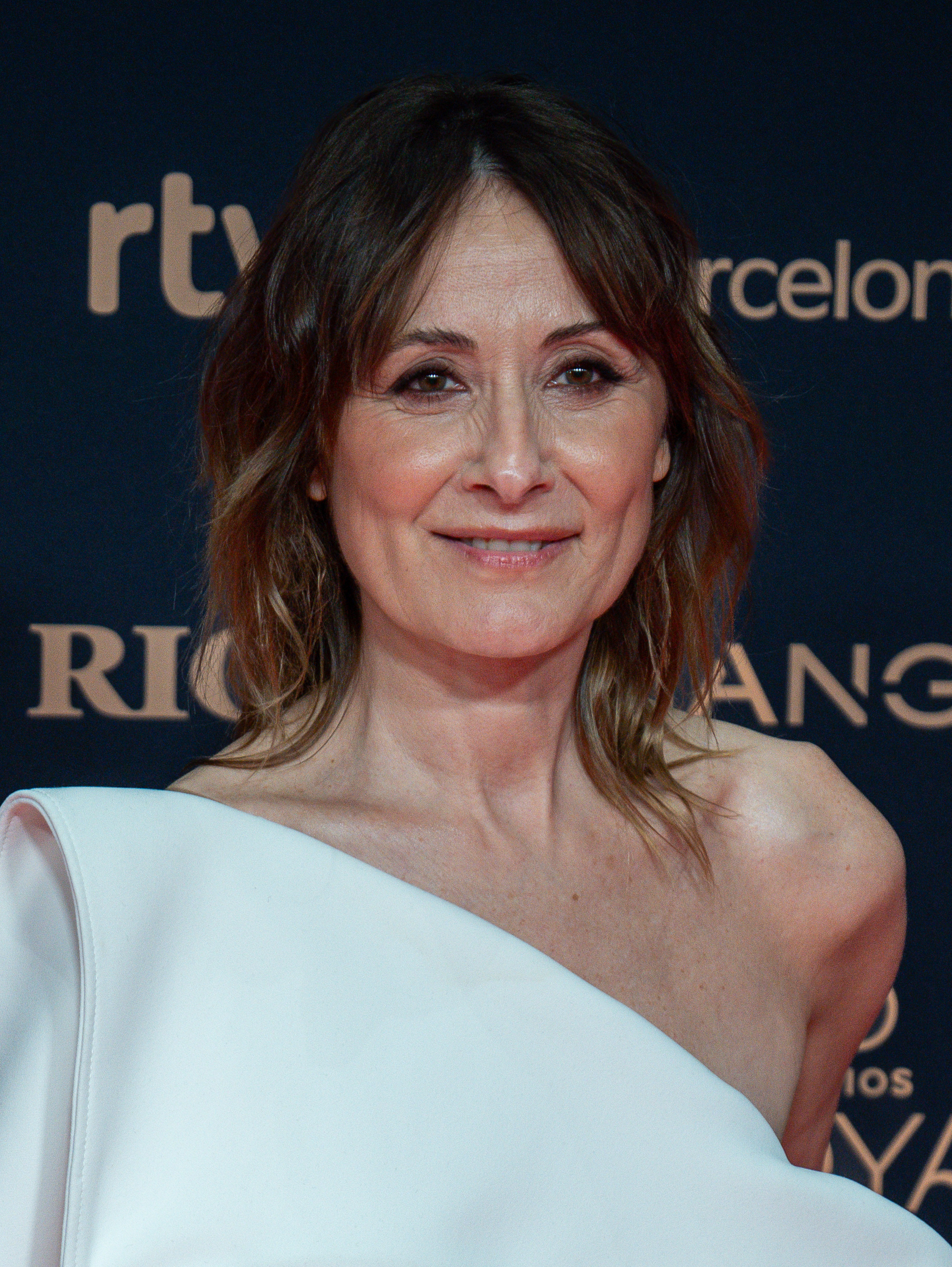
- Poza in 2026
- Born: Nathalie Poza Maupain; 7 March 1972 (age 54); Madrid, Spain
- Occupation: Actress
- Years active: 1995-present

Nathalie Poza Maupain (born 7 March 1972) is a Spanish film, stage, and television actress. She is the recipient of several accolades including two Goya Awards and five Actors and Actresses Union Awards.

In the 1990s, Poza combined a stage career with roles in television series. She made her feature film debut in musical comedy The Other Side of the Bed (2002). Poza's performance in comedy Football Days (2003) earned her a nomination to the Goya Award for Best New Actress.

She has since featured in films such as Hard Times (2005), All the Women (2013), Can't Say Goodbye (2017), While at War (2019), and Rosa's Wedding (2020).

== Early life ==
Nathalie Poza Maupain was born on 7 March 1972 in Madrid, the daughter of a French mother and a Spanish father. She studied at a British bilingual school in Madrid. She reportedly suffered from severe eating disorders in her teenage years. From a young age, she learned to play the piano and practiced ballet.

She trained her acting chops under Cristina Rota. In 1996, alongside fellow actors Alberto San Juan, Guillermo Toledo, and Ernesto Alterio, Poza founded the theatre group 'Ración de Oreja', which later became Animalario.

== Screen career ==
In television she has had many secondary roles since the mid 1990s, including appearances in Hermanas, Éste es mi barrio, Más que amigos, Periodistas, Señor alcalde, and El comisario, the last of which she has appeared in several episodes. In her first fixed television role in 2001, she played Nerea in Policías, en el corazón de la calle.

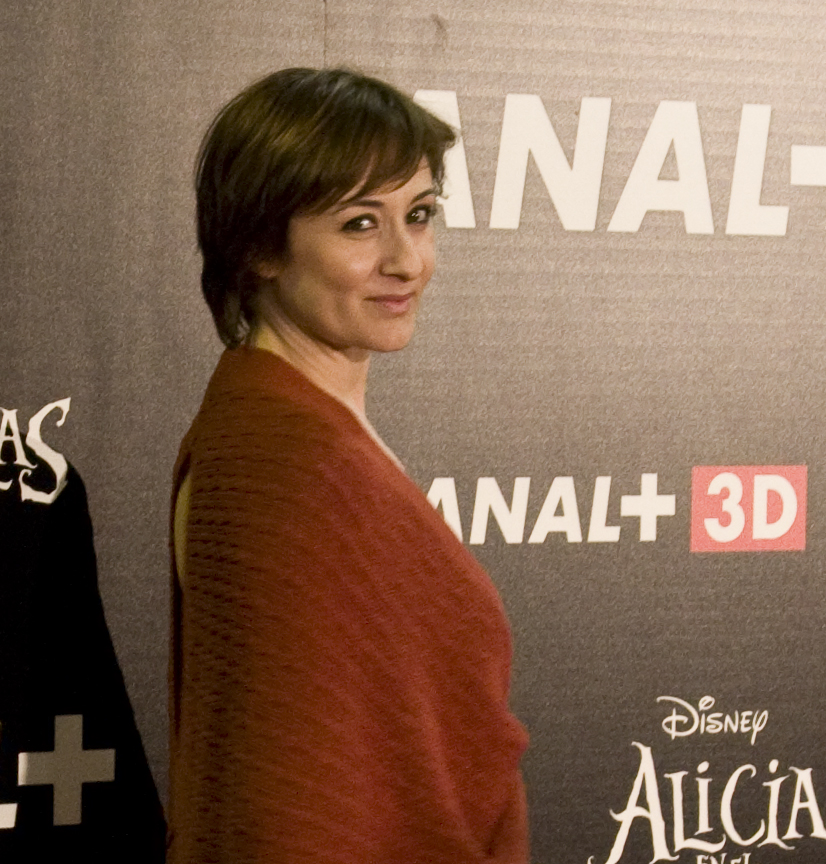
Poza at the photo wall of Alice in Wonderland in 2010

Later, she appeared in Hospital Central, and, in more permanent roles, in Un lugar en el mundo (2003) and Maneras de sobrevivir (2005). Her first cinematographic works were the short films Abierto (El eco del tiempo) (1997), by Jaime Marques; No sé, no sé (1998), by Aitor Gaizka and Ruth está bien (1999), by Pablo Valiente.

In 2002, she filmed the television movie Entre cien fuegos under the orders of Iñaki Eizmendi and that same year premiered The Other Side of the Bed, by Emilio Martínez-Lázaro, one of the most successful Spanish films in recent years. The next year, Maria Ripoll directed her in Utopía. She also acted in Football Days, by David Serrano de la Peña and The Weakness of the Bolshevik, by Manuel Martín Cuenca. She acted again in movies with both directors, filming Malas temporadas with Cuenca in 2005, and Cinema Days with Serrano in 2007.

She then filmed Salir pitando (2007), directed by Álvaro Fernández Armero; El club de los suicidas (2007), by Roberto Santiago; and the thriller Un buen hombre (2009), directed by Juan Martínez Moreno. During those years, she acted in television, in series such as LEX (2008), Hispania, la leyenda (2010-2012) and its spin-off Imperium (2012). In 2013, the film Todas las mujeres premiered, directed by Mariano Barroso, for which she received her third Goya nomination, for best supporting actress. In 2015 she joined the series Carlos, rey emperador, where she plays Germaine of Foix.

== Views ==
In July 2025, Poza signed along with over 1,000 artists a letter sent to the Government of Spain demanding an immediate and comprehensive embargo of arms and defense material on Israel by means of a Royal Decree-Law. Also in 2025, Poza co-signed a manifesto promoted by FiSahara decrying the filming of The Odyssey in Moroccan-occupied Western Sahara.

== Filmography ==
=== Short films ===
Year	Title	Director
1997	Abierto (El eco del tiempo)	Jaime Marques
1998	No sé, no sé	Aitor Gaizka

=== Feature films ===
Year	Title	Role	Notes	Ref.
2002	El otro lado de la cama (The Other Side of the Bed)	Lucía		
2003	Días de fútbol (Football Days)	Patricia		
2003	La flaqueza del bolchevique (The Weakness of the Bolshevik)	Eva		
2005	Malas temporadas (Hard Times)	Ana		
2007	Días de cine (Cinema Days)	Silvia Conde		
2007	Salir pitando	Yolanda		
2009	Un buen hombre (A Good Man)	Paula		
2012	Lo mejor de Eva (Dark Impulse)	Berta		
2013	Todas las mujeres (All the Women)	Andrea		
2016	Julieta	Juana		
2017	No sé decir adiós (Can't Say Goodbye)	Carla		
2018	70 binladens (70 Big Ones)	Lola		
2019	Mientras dure la guerra (While at War)	Ana Carrasco		
2020	Invisibles (The Invisible)	Amelia		
2020	La boda de Rosa (Rosa's Wedding)	Violeta		
2020	Rifkin's Festival			
2023	Honeymoon	Eva		
2024	Marco, la verdad inventada (Marco, the Invented Truth)	Laura		
2024	Daniela Forever	Victoria		

=== Television ===
Year	Title	Channel
1996	Éste es mi barrio	Antena 3
1998	Hermanas	Telecinco
1998	Periodistas	Telecinco
1998	Señor alcalde	Telecinco
1999	El comisario	Telecinco
2001	Policías, en el corazón de la calle	Antena 3
2003	Un lugar en el mundo	Antena 3
2004	Hospital Central	Telecinco
2005	Maneras de sobrevivir	
2005	Motivos personales	Telecinco
2008	LEX	Antena 3
2010	La princesa de Éboli	
2010-2012	Hispania, la leyenda	Antena 3
2012	Imperium	Antena 3
2015	Carlos, Rey Emperador	TVE
2017	La catedral del mar	Antena 3
2017	Traición	La 1
2020	La unidad	Movistar+

== Stage performances ==
- El fin de los sueños
- Pornografía barata
- El libertino
- Dulce pájaro de juventud (2001)
- Como en las mejores familias (2003)
- Hamelín (2005)
- Marat-Sade (2007)
- Tito Andrónico (2009)
- Penumbra (2010)
- A cielo abierto (2013), Teatro Español
- Fuegos (2013), Teatro Romano de Mérica
- Desde Berlín (tribute to Lou Reed) (2014)
- Prostitución (2020), Teatro Español
- Un tranvía llamado deseo (2025), Teatro Palacio Valdés

== Awards and nominations ==
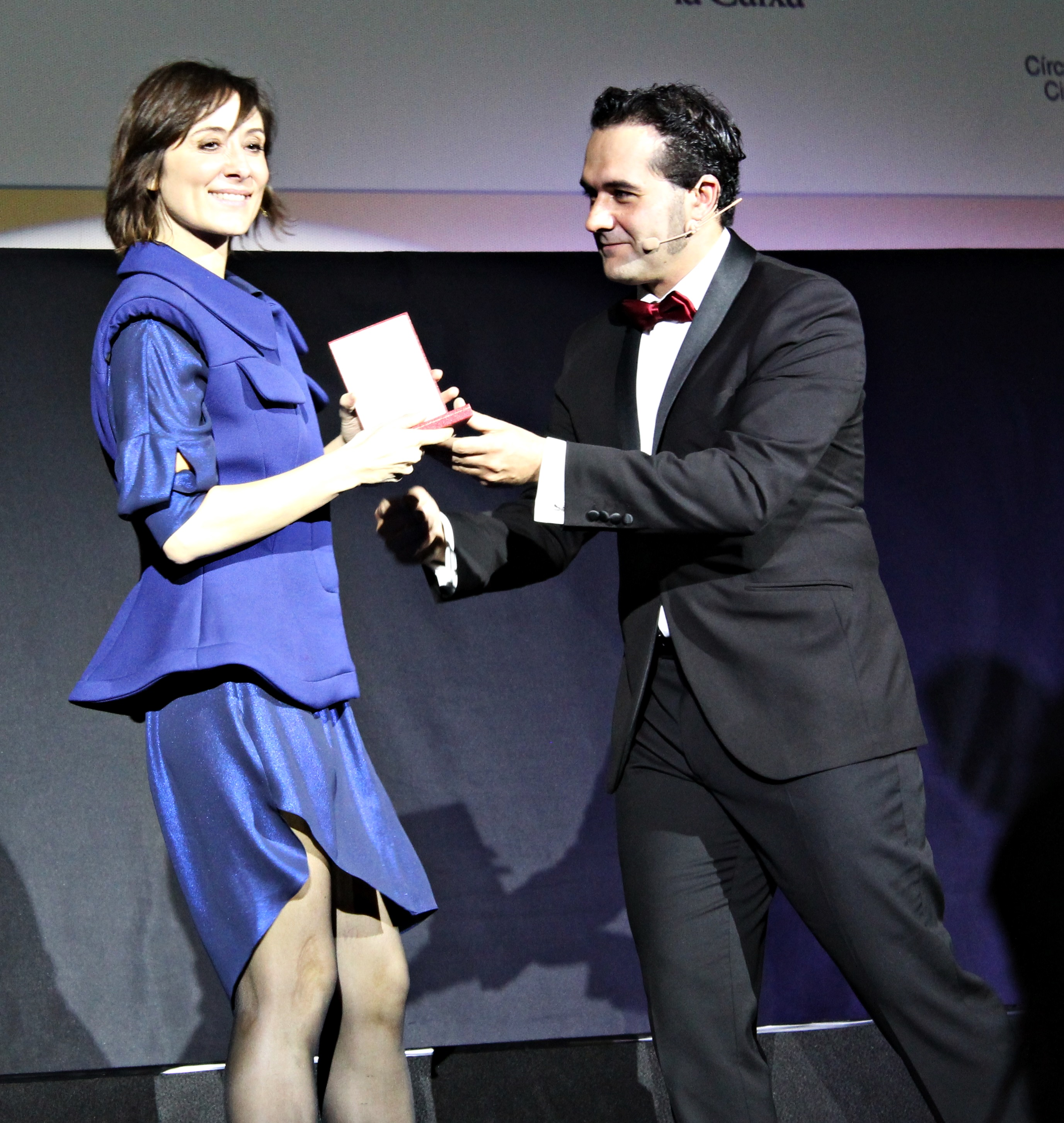
Nathalie Poza collecting her CEC Medal for Best Actress for her performance in Can't Say Goodbye

Poza has been recognized by the Academy of Cinematographic Arts and Sciences of Spain for the following:

- 18th Goya Awards: Best New Actress, nomination, for Football Days (2003)
- 20th Goya Awards: Best Actress, nomination, for Hard Times (2005)
- 28th Goya Awards: Best Supporting Actress, nomination, for All the Women (2013)
- 32nd Goya Awards: Best Actress, win, for Can't Say Goodbye (2017)
- 34th Goya Awards: Best Supporting Actress, nomination, for While at War (2019)
- 35th Goya Awards: Best Supporting Actress, win, for Rosa's Wedding (2020)

She has also won 5 Actors and Actresses Union Awards (out of 13 nominations) and one Talía Award.
