= Wolf Beach =

- Film poster
- Spanish: Playa de Lobos
- Directed by: Javier Veiga
- Written by: Javier Veiga
- Produced by: Marta Hazas; Sara Fernández-Velasco; José Velasco; Javier Veiga
- Starring: Guillermo Francella; Dani Rovira; Antonia San Juan; Marta Hazas
- Cinematography: Javier Salmones
- Edited by: Jani Madrileño
- Music by: Alfred Tapscott
- Production companies: Mediolimón; Zebra Producciones; Epos Cine
- Distributed by: Tripictures
- Release dates: 21 March 2025 (Málaga); 5 December 2025 (Spain)
- Running time: 100 minutes
- Country: Spain
- Language: Spanish

Wolf Beach (Spanish: Playa de Lobos) is a 2025 comedy thriller film written and directed by Javier Veiga. It stars Guillermo Francella and Dani Rovira.

== Plot ==
Set in Fuerteventura, the plot follows the escalating interactions between Klaus, a tourist who does not want to get up from the lounge chair at the beach bar, and worker Manu, as the latter begins to suspect that Klaus is not there by chance and is not who he claims to be.

== Cast ==
- Dani Rovira as Manu
- Guillermo Francella as Klaus
- Marta Hazas as tourist guide
- Antonia San Juan as taxi driver
- Denisse Peña
- Asier Etxeandia
- Javier Veiga as Florentino

== Production ==
Wolf Beach is a Mediolimón, Zebra (Grupo IZEN), and Epos Cine production, with backing from RTVE and the collaboration from Pampa Films. It was fully shot in Fuerteventura.

== Release ==
The film was presented at the 28th Málaga Film Festival on 21 March 2025. Distributed by Tripictures, it was released theatrically in Spain on 5 December 2025.

It was released in Argentina on 26 February 2026 by Buena Vista International, marking the first film released in Latin America under the revived Buena Vista International label after Walt Disney Studios Motion Pictures phased out Star Distribution in the region.

== Reception ==
Sergio F. Pinilla of Cinemanía rated the film 4 out of 5 stars, comparing it to Strangers on a Train, but on a Canarian chiringuito and with a Porteño sense of humour.

Ignacio Camacho of MeriStation rated the film 2½ out of 5 stars, assessing that despite having "a clever script", "it drags on a bit and ends up being less surprising than it sets out to be".

Carmen L. Lobo of La Razón gave the film a 3-star rating, comparing it to a mix of Sleuth and Strangers on a Train, singling out "a mysterious and detestable" Francella as the best thing about it.

Alejandro Lingenti of La Nación rated the film 2 out of 5 stars determining as an otherwise "monotonous" story "driven by an overly drawn-out verbal sparring match between the main characters".

Manuel J. Lombardo of Diario de Sevilla described the "exasperating" film as "a pathetic, never-ending beach duel between a dim-witted beach vendor" and a "supposed Swedish-Argentine tourist".

== See also ==
- List of Spanish films of 2025
