= Fräulein Else =

Fräulein Else may refer to:

- Fräulein Else (novella), a short work by the Austrian writer Arthur Schnitzler
- Fräulein Else (1929 film), a German silent film directed by Paul Czinner
- Fräulein Else (2014 film), directed by Anna Martinetz
