= The Child (2026 film) =

- Promotional release poster
- Spanish: El niño
- Directed by: Mariano Barroso
- Written by: Mariano Barroso
- Based on: El niño by Fernando Aramburu
- Produced by: Mariano Barroso; Rafael Portela
- Starring: Belén Cuesta; Karra Elejalde
- Cinematography: Marc Gómez del Moral
- Music by: Fernando Velázquez
- Production company: Umea Films
- Distributed by: Tripictures
- Release date: 13 November 2026
- Running time: 104 minutes
- Country: Spain
- Language: Spanish

The Child (Spanish: El niño) is a 2026 Spanish drama film written and directed by Mariano Barroso based on the novel by Fernando Aramburu. It stars Belén Cuesta and Karra Elejalde.

It had limited theatrical release in Spain on 13 November 2026 ahead of its 27 November 2026 streaming debut on Netflix.

== Plot ==
Mariaje and Nicasio face the death of their, respectively, son and grandson in a 1980 gas explosion in a town of Biscay, with each developing a unique way of coping and moving past the loss.

== Cast ==
- Belén Cuesta as Mariaje
- Karra Elejalde as Nicasio
- Pep Ambròs
- Raquel Ferri
- Joan Solé
- Alex Infantes

== Production ==
The Child is a screen adaptation of the novel by Fernando Aramburu, which is based in turn in the 1980 Ortuella gas explosion that resulted in the deaths of 50 children between the ages of 5 and 6 and 3 adults. The film was produced by Mariano Barroso and Rafael Portela (Umea Films). Marc Gómez del Moral worked as director of photography. Shooting locations in Biscay included Bilbao, Mundaka, Bermeo, Gernika, Barakaldo, Ugao-Miraballes, Ondarroa, Orduña, Santurtzi, Balmaseda, and Sukarrieta.

== Release ==
The film will receive a theatrical release in Spain on 13 November 2026. It will be subsequently released on Netflix streaming on 27 November 2026.

== Reception ==
Begoña Piña of Cinemanía rated the film 3 out of 5 stars considering that a cast of powerful performers come together here with a fantastic set design work.

Juan Pando of Fotogramas rated the film 3 out of 5 stars, positively valuing the "splendid" Basque setting and cinematography as well as Barroso's direction of actors, but lamenting that the story, however, becomes somewhat disjointed as it advances.

== See also ==
- List of Spanish films of 2026
