= Stranded (2015 film) =

- Theatrical release poster
- Spanish: Incidencias
- Directed by: José Corbacho; Juan Cruz
- Written by: Jaime Bartolomé; José Corbacho; Juan Cruz
- Produced by: Julio Fernández P.
- Starring: Toni Acosta; Karim Ait M'Hand; Roberto Álamo; Nao Albet; Ernesto Alterio; Carlos Areces; Lola Dueñas; Miki Esparbé; Aida Folch; Nuria Gago; Saras Gil; Rubén Ochandiano; Alfonsa Rosso; Manuel Segura; Imanol Arias; Rossy de Palma
- Cinematography: Mario Montero
- Edited by: Nacho Ruiz Capillas
- Music by: Arnau Bataller
- Production companies: Castelao Pictures; Incidencias la película AIE
- Distributed by: Filmax
- Release dates: 24 October 2015 (Seminci); 31 December 2015 (Spain)
- Running time: 87 minutes
- Country: Spain
- Language: Spanish

Stranded (Spanish: Incidencias) is 2015 Spanish black comedy film directed by José Corbacho and Juan Cruz. Its ensemble cast features Ernesto Alterio, Lola Dueñas, Carlos Areces, Rubén Ochandiano, Miki Esparbé, Toni Acosta, Roberto Álamo, Nao Albet, Núria Gago, Aida Folch, Karim Ait M'Hand, Saras Gil, Alfonsa Rosso, and Manuel Segura.

== Plot ==
On New Year's Eve, after an AVE train on its way from Barcelona to Madrid stops in the middle of nowhere, its stranded passengers and crew members bring out their secrets.

== Cast ==
- Lola Dueñas as Nuria
- Carlos Areces as Paco
- Ernesto Alterio as José Mª
- Toni Acosta as Solana
- Nuria Gago as Sara
- Rubén Ochandiano as Carlos
- Aida Folch as Laura
- Roberto Álamo as Guillermo
- Miki Esparbé as Ramiro
- Karim Ait M'Hand as André
- Nao Albet as Jordi
- Saras Gil as Miyaki
- Alfonsa Rosso as Teresa
- Manuel Segura as Manolo
- Imanol Arias
- Rossy de Palma

== Production ==
The film is a Castelao Pictures and Incidencias la película AIE production, and it had the participation of TVE and TVC. Shooting locations in Catalonia included L'Hospitalet de Llobregat, Barcelona, and Súria.

== Release ==
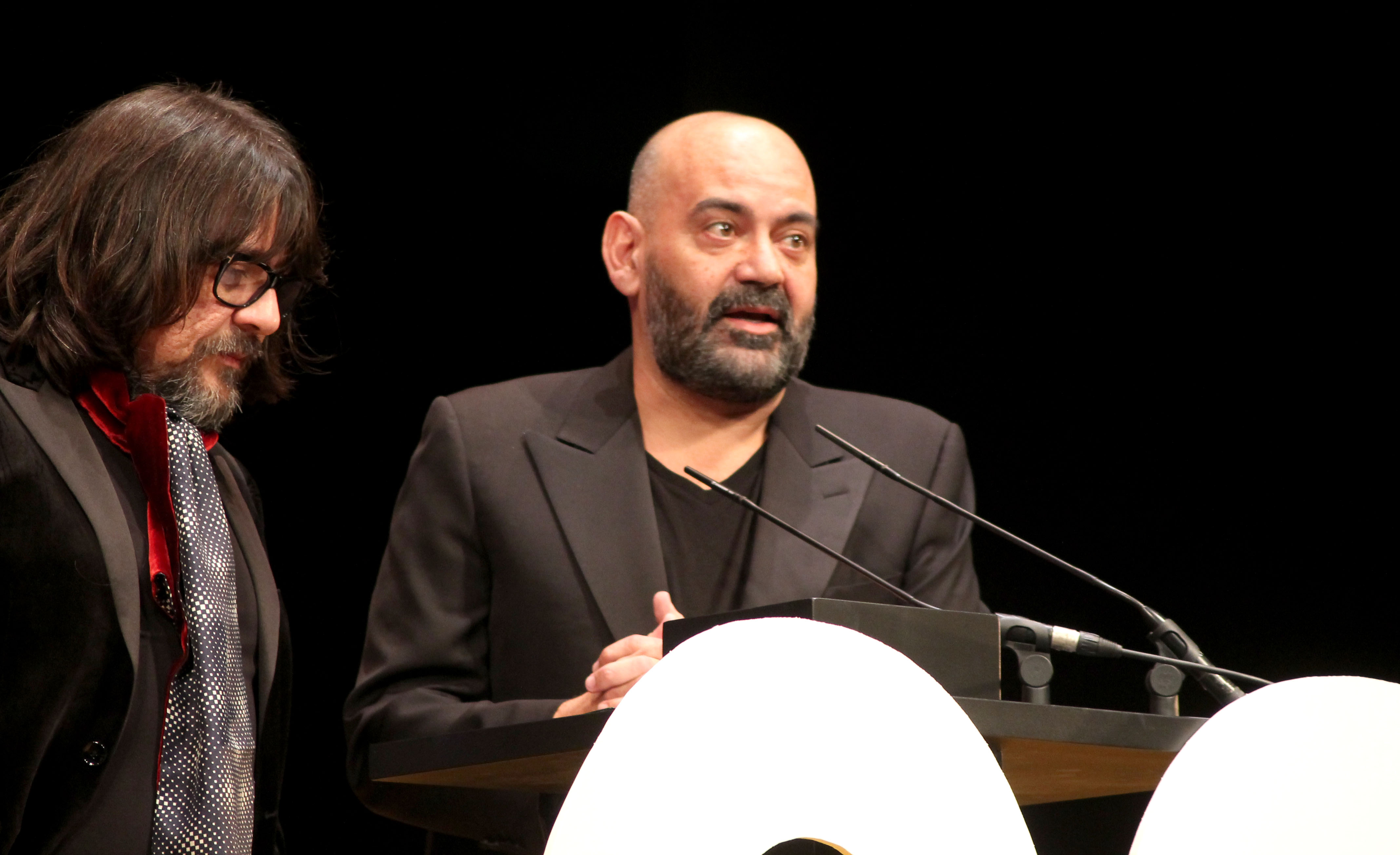
Corbacho and Cruz attending the presentation of the film at the 2015 Seminci.

The film was presented at the 60th Valladolid International Film Festival (Seminci) in a non-competitive slot on 24 October 2015. Distributed by Filmax, it was released theatrically on 31 December 2015.

== Reception ==
Javier Ocaña of El País declared Stranded an "inexplicable" comedy from "the first minute to the last", giving the impression of being a "half-done" work.

Manuel J. Lombardo of Diario de Sevilla wrote that "none of its stories, none of its gags, none of its jokes ever raise the slightest smile".

Fausto Fernández of Fotogramas rated the film three out of five stars, deeming it to be "great entertainment" and "a great vehicle for the showcasing of its cast".

== See also ==
- List of Spanish films of 2015
