= Crimen imperfecto =

- Directed by: Fernando Fernán Gómez
- Written by: Pedro Masó; Antonio Vich
- Starring: Fernando Fernán Gómez; José Luis López Vázquez; Álvaro de Luna; Jesús Puente; Bárbara Rey
- Release date: 1970
- Running time: 88 minutes
- Country: Spain
- Language: Spanish

Crimen imperfecto is a 1970 Spanish comedy film, directed and starred by Fernando Fernán Gómez, and co-starred by José Luis López Vázquez. They play two detectives, Salomón and Torcuato, who find themselves involved in a strange case of fund theft and murders. Several critics have noted that the main duo is inspired by the comic book characters Mort & Phil.

== Plot ==
The plot revolves around two detectives, Salomón and Torcuato, who get entangled in a scheme involving the theft of company funds, mixed with murders, deceptions, and unexpected events.

== Reception and criticism ==
The film had a very poor reception and went almost unnoticed at the box office (and remains mainly obscure to this day). It was not well received by critics either, and its own director, Fernán Gómez, was not satisfied with the result, stating that it was a childish film "but forbidden for minors". However, some critics later defended the film, such as Ramón Freixas, who described it as an “explosive cinematic cocktail” and a "happy example of real possibilism".
