= Bad Influence (2025 film) =

- Theatrical release poster
- Spanish: Mala influencia
- Directed by: Chloé Wallace
- Screenplay by: Chloé Wallace; Diana Muro
- Based on: Mala influencia by Teensspirit
- Produced by: Kiko Martínez; Juan Mayne
- Starring: Alberto Olmo; Eléa Rochera; Mirela Balić; Sara Ariño; Farid Bechara; Fer Fraga; Mar Isern; Selam Ortega; Clara Chain; Enrique Arce
- Cinematography: Beatriz Sastre
- Edited by: Mario Maroto
- Music by: Pedro Merchán
- Production companies: Nadie es Perfecto PC; N&L Films; Imperfect Films AIE
- Distributed by: Tripictures
- Release date: 24 January 2025
- Country: Spain
- Language: Spanish

Bad Influence (Spanish: Mala influencia) is a 2025 Spanish romantic drama film directed by Chloé Wallace (in her directorial debut) based on a Wattpad story. It stars Alberto Olmo and Eléa Rochera.

== Plot ==
The plot follows the relationship between wealthy girl Reese and the troubled criminal Eros, the bodyguard Reese's father Bruce has hired to protect her.

== Cast ==
- Eléa Rochera as Reese
- Alberto Olmo as Eros
- Selam Ortega as Bárbara
- Farid Bechara as Diego
- Mirela Balić as Peyton
- Mar Isern as Karol
- Sara Ariño as Lily
- Clara Chain as Ariadna
- Fer Fraga as Raúl
- Enrique Arce as Bruce

== Production ==
Written by Chloé Wallace and Diana Muro, the screenplay is based on Teensspirit's Wattpad story Mala influencia, released in a physical format by Random House in 2021. The film is a Nadie es Perfecto and N&L Films co-production. Reportedly horrorized by the watching of Three Steps Above Heaven, Wallace did not want the character Eros to fully conform to hetero-cis-normativity. Filming began in Valencia. Shooting locations in the Valencia region also included the Ciudad de la Luz studio in Alicante. Naiara performed the film's main theme "Mala influencia".

== Release ==
Distributed by Tripictures, the film was released theatrically in Spain on 24 January 2025.

== Reception ==
Enid Román Almansa of Cinemanía rated the film 3 out of 5 stars, considering that while [the film is] not precisely set to revolution the genre, "Wallace's hand as director and screenwriter is noticeable, and appreciated and, above all, [the film] establishes a good starting point".

Johnny Loftus of Decider.com wrote, that the film "has hotness and hunkiness going for it. What it doesn't have is much that kept us interested, beyond the sense of will-they-or-won’t-they excitement at its core".

== See also ==
- List of Spanish films of 2025
