= Cowards (2008 film) =

- Theatrical release poster
- Spanish: Cobardes
- Directed by: José Corbacho; Juan Cruz
- Written by: José Corbacho; Juan Cruz
- Produced by: Tedy Villalba; Julio Fernández
- Starring: Eduardo Garé; Eduardo Espinilla; Elvira Mínguez; Antonio de la Torre; Lluís Homar; Paz Padilla; Frank Crudele; Blanca Apilánez; Ariadna Gaya; Javier Bódalo; Gorka Zubeldia; Albert Baulies
- Cinematography: David Omedes
- Edited by: David Gallart
- Music by: Pablo Sala
- Production companies: Castelao Productions; Antena 3 Films
- Distributed by: Filmax
- Release dates: 5 April 2008 (Málaga); 25 April 2008 (Spain)
- Country: Spain
- Language: Spanish

Cowards (Spanish: Cobardes) is a 2008 Spanish bullying-themed drama film written and directed by José Corbacho and Juan Cruz which stars Eduardo Garé and Eduardo Espinilla.

== Plot ==
The plot takes place in L'Hospitalet de Llobregat, following the plight of school bully Guille and his victim, redhead Gaby.

== Cast ==
- Eduardo Espinilla as Guille
- Eduardo Garé as Gaby
- Ariadna Gaya as Carla
- Antonio de la Torre as Joaquín
- Elvira Mínguez as Merche
- Lluís Homar as Guillermo
- Paz Padilla as Magda
- Blanca Apilánez as tutora
- Frank Crudele as Silverio
- Javier Bódalo as Chape
- Gorka Zubeldia as Leo
- Albert Baulies as Jan

== Production ==
The film is a Castelao Productions and Antena 3 Films production. Shooting locations included L'Hospitalet de Llobregat.

== Release ==
The film was presented at the 11th Málaga Film Festival in April 2008. Distributed by Filmax, it was released theatrically in Spain on 25 April 2008.

== Reception ==
Jonathan Holland of Variety deemed the film to be "a well-turned sophomore drama", even though "over-strident in its political correctness".

Javier Ocaña of El País considered that the helmers had moved from the "freshness, boldness and uniqueness" of their debut work to the "doctrine, discourse and academicism" of Cowards, underpinning "a coarse and inconsequential discourse".

Toni Vall of Cinemanía rated the film 2 out of 5 stars, finding it "so stubborn in the cliché, in the formula, in the most well-known archetype".

== Accolades ==
Year	Award	Category	Nominee(s)	Result	Ref.
2009	23rd Goya Awards	Best Supporting Actress	Elvira Mínguez	Nominated	

== See also ==
- List of Spanish films of 2008
