= Éxtasis (film) =

1996 film

- Film poster
- Directed by: Mariano Barroso
- Written by: Joaquín Oristrell; Mariano Barroso
- Produced by: Gerardo Herrero
- Starring: Javier Bardem
- Cinematography: Flavio Martínez Labiano
- Distributed by: Alta Films
- Release date: 16 February 1996
- Running time: 93 minutes
- Country: Spain
- Language: Spanish
- Box office: $1.08 million (Spain)

Éxtasis is a 1996 Spanish drama film directed by Mariano Barroso. It was entered into the 46th Berlin International Film Festival.

== Cast ==
- Javier Bardem as Rober
- Federico Luppi as Daniel
- Sílvia Munt as Lola
- Daniel Guzmán as Max
- Leire Berrocal as Ona
- Alfonso Lussón as Uncle of Rober
- Guillermo Rodríguez as Quino
- Carlos Lucas as Hombre
- Juan Díaz as Hermano de Ona
- Elia Muñoz as Empleada
- Macarena Pombo as Ayudante
- Pep Cortés as Padre de Ona
- Paco Catalá as Dueño pensión
