= Vivien Neves =

British glamour model (1947–2002)

- Born: Vivien Elizabeth Neves; 20 November 1947; Brighton, England
- Died: 29 December 2002 (aged 55); Guildford, England
- Occupation: Glamour model
- Known for: Nude modelling
- Spouse: John Kelly
- Children: 1

Vivien Elizabeth Neves (20 November 1947 – 29 December 2002) was a British glamour model, best known for appearing naked in The Times broadsheet newspaper in 1971, and for her regular appearances on Page 3 of the tabloid newspaper The Sun.

== Early life ==
Neves was born in Brighton, England, on 20 November 1947, and grew up in a council flat. Her father worked for the gas board. She followed her parents to Walton-on-Thames in Surrey and had several short-lived jobs, leaving school at age sixteen.

== Career ==
Neves moved to London in the mid-1960s and began working as a "bunny" at the Raymond Revuebar in Soho. She posed as Pet of the Month in Penthouse magazine and became known as "The Body" twenty-five years before the same nickname was applied to supermodel Elle Macpherson. A poster campaign by clothing company Nelbarden featured Neves in a swimsuit and appeared comprehensively on the London Underground.

In 1969 Neves was cast as the model 'Tulia' in the film Whirlpool, which The New York Times described as a "sex-and-violence movie"; its review noted that Tulia "is very pretty, and her clothes come off frequently" but that the film suffered from "certain basic flaws" and was "most impressively undistinguished in its dialogue".

In May 1970 Neves made her first of many appearances as a topless Page 3 girl in The Sun. On 17 March 1971 she appeared in The Times in a full-page advert for Fisons Pharmaceuticals. The advert—which featured the strapline "What's a nice girl like you doing in a firm like this?"—caused a sensation; it was the first time a woman had appeared naked in a broadsheet newspaper, and it brought Neves international attention. In the same year she appeared alongside Tony Curtis and Roger Moore in an episode of The Persuaders!

In the early 1970's she featured in many advertisements for the Norton motorcycle company, as their favoured "poster girl".

Neves retired in early 1973, stating that she was "embarrassed and tired of being in front of the camera".

In the mid-1980s Neves set up the Vivien Neves Modelling Agency, specialising in Page 3 work.

== Personal life ==
Neves moved to Guildford and married John Kelly, a photographer. They had one daughter, Kelly, who became a Page 3 girl in the 1990s. Neves was diagnosed with multiple sclerosis in 1979, and her marriage to Kelly was dissolved in 1985. Neves died on 29 December 2002, after contracting pneumonia.
