= Daniela Forever =

- Theatrical release poster
- Directed by: Nacho Vigalondo
- Written by: Nacho Vigalondo
- Produced by: Nahikari Ipiña; Nacho Vigalondo; Benoit Roland; Leire Apellaniz
- Starring: Henry Golding; Beatrice Grannò; Aura Garrido; Rubén Ochandiano; Nathalie Poza
- Cinematography: Jon D. Domínguez
- Edited by: Carolina Martínez Urbina
- Music by: Hidrogenesse
- Production companies: Daniela Forever AIE; Sayaka Producciones; Wrong Men; Señor y Señora; Mediacrest Entertainment
- Distributed by: Filmax (es)
- Release dates: 6 September 2024 (TIFF); 21 February 2025 (Spain)
- Running time: 118 minutes
- Countries: Spain; Belgium
- Language: English
- Box office: $64,085

Daniela Forever is a 2024 science fiction romantic drama film written and directed by Nacho Vigalondo. Its plot follows a young man (Henry Golding) reviving his lost love (Beatrice Grannò) through lucid dreams, with unintended consequences.

The film premiered at the 2024 Toronto International Film Festival. It was released in Spanish theatres by Filmax on 21 February 2025.

== Plot ==
The plot is set in Madrid. Uneasily coping with the tragic loss of his significant other Daniela, Nicolas joins a clinical trial delivering a reconstruction of Daniela by means of lucid dreams.

== Cast ==
- Henry Golding as Nicolas
- Beatrice Grannò as Daniela
- Rubén Ochandiano as Garrido
- Aura Garrido as Teresa
- Nathalie Poza as Victoria
- Pilar Bergés as Susi
- Rocío Saiz as Catalina
- Frank Feys as doctor Raymond

== Production ==
The film is a Spanish-Belgian co-production by Sayaka Producciones, Wrong Men, Señor y Señora, and Mediacrest Entertainment with funding from ICAA, Wallimage, Filmin, and Movistar Plus+. XYZ Films handled sales. In February 2023, the project was revealed, with Nacho Vigalondo as director and Henry Golding as a lead actor. Vigalondo then stated that he hoped the story delivered "everything I want to say about love, dreams and Madrid". Later in April 2023, Beatrice Grannò was reported to have joined the cast as a co-star. In July 2023, Rubén Ochandiano was reported to be part of the film, with Ochandiano likewise reporting Aura Garrido and Nathalie Poza as fellow cast members. Filming took place in Madrid.

== Release ==
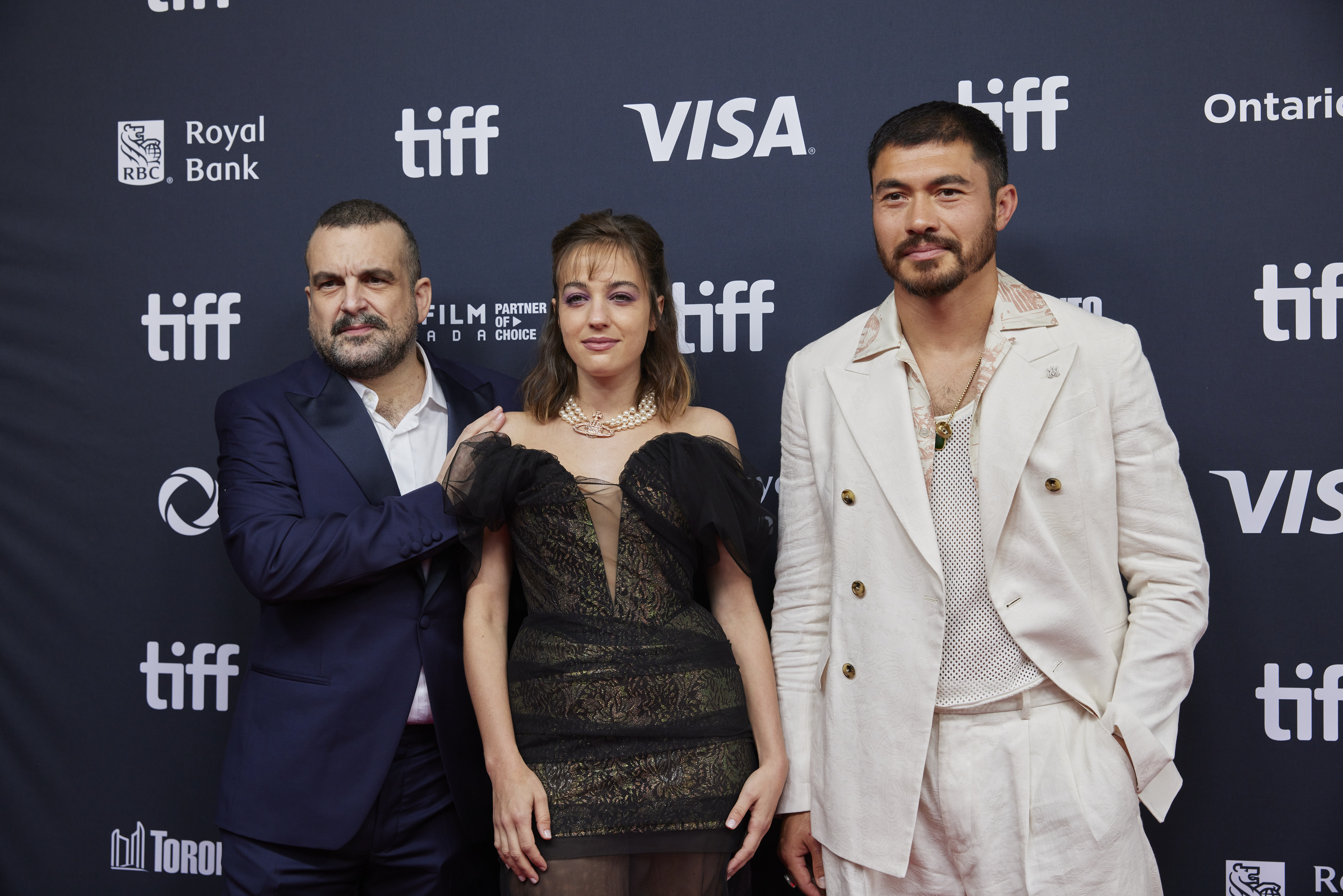
Vigalondo, Grannò, and Golding attending the presentation of the film at the 2024 TIFF

Selected as the opening film of the Platform Prize competition of the 49th Toronto International Film Festival, the film premiered on 6 September 2024. It also made it to the slate of the 2024 Fantastic Fest (for its US premiere) and to the official selection of the 57th Sitges Film Festival (for its European premiere).

Distributed by Filmax, the film was scheduled to be released theatrically in Spain on 28 February 2025. The theatrical release date was subsequently moved forward one week to 21 February 2025.

Well Go USA acquired North-American distribution rights to the film.

== Reception ==
On the review aggregator website Rotten Tomatoes, 65% of 55 critics' reviews are positive, with an average rating of 6.8/10.

Jourdain Searles of IndieWire gave the film a 'B' rating, writing that "there's something to be said about a love story that isn't afraid to admit that one of the lovers isn't the charming dreamboat he appears to be".

Chase Hutchinson of TheWrap wrote that the film "is afraid to ever dream big, leaving nothing more than a banal nightmare".

Olivia Popp of Cineuropa judged that it is much more rewarding "to read the feature less as a sci-fi/romance blend than a journey of sci-fi existentialism that interrogates the nature of desire, attachment and loneliness.".

Raquel Hernández Luján of HobbyConsolas gave the film 75 points ('good'), writing that Vigalondo tells a story "in which art, dream and mourning come together in a visually dazzling way, even if there are twists and turns that shake the narrative".

Fausto Fernández of Fotogramas rated the film 4 out of 5 stars, declaring it "a wonderful act of love, selfish, manipulative but ultimately full of sincerity and sacrifice".

Rubén Romero Santos of Cinemanía rated the film 4½ out of 5 stars, deeming it to be "a critique of escapism" and "a vindication of the stoic sense of life".

== Accolades ==
Year	Award	Category	Nominee(s)	Result	Ref.
2026	13th Feroz Awards	Best Original Soundtrack	Hidrogenesse	Nominated	

== See also ==
- List of Spanish films of 2025
