= José Corbacho =

Spanish comedian, screenwriter, actor and director

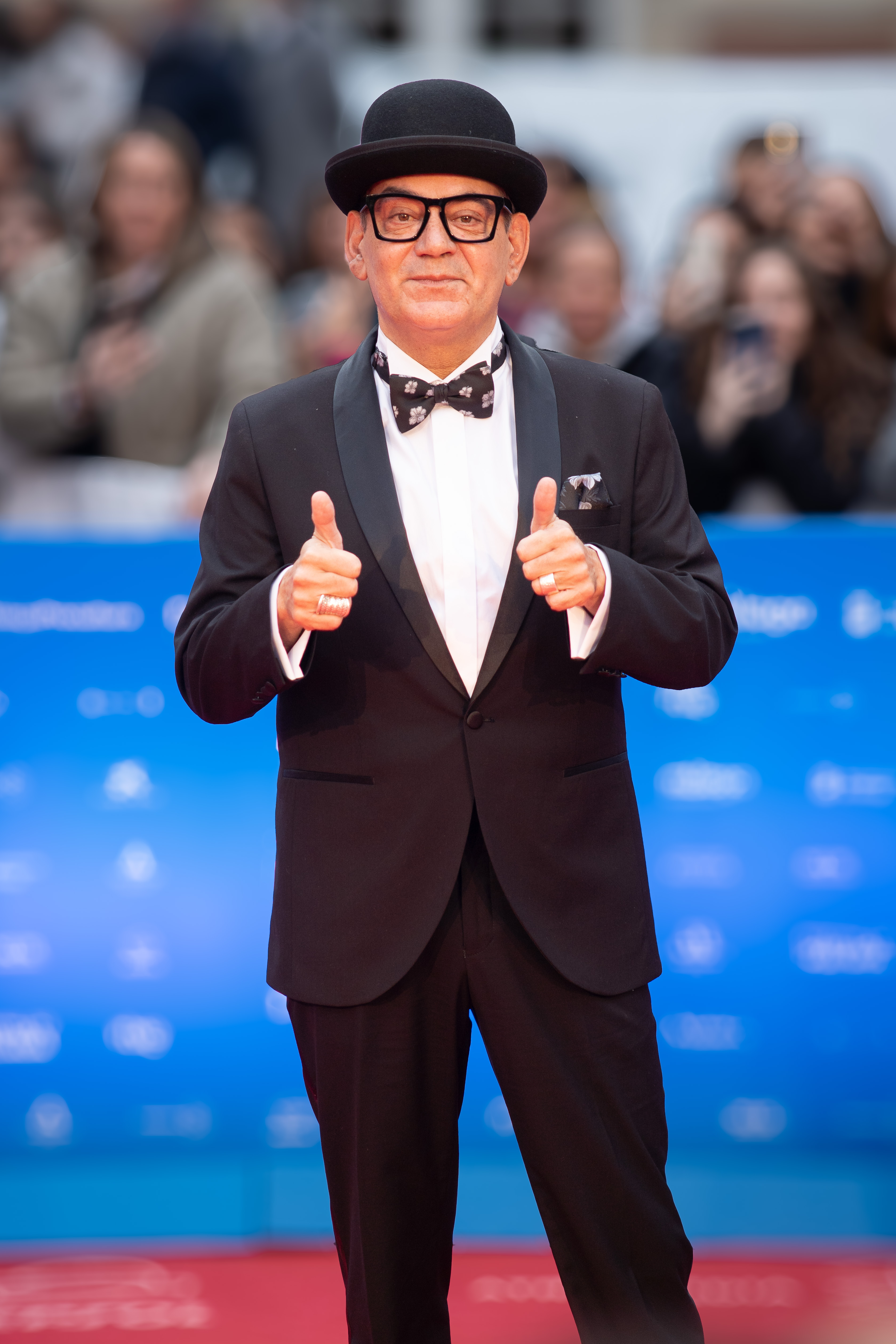
- Corbacho in 2024
- Born: José Corbacho Nieto; 12 December 1965 (age 60); L'Hospitalet de Llobregat, Spain
- Education: Autonomous University of Barcelona (Lic.)
- Occupations: Comedian; screenwriter; film director; television director; actor; television host; producer

José Corbacho Nieto (born 12 December 1965) is a Spanish comedian, screenwriter, actor, and film and television director from Catalonia.

== Biography ==
José Corbacho Nieto was born on 12 December 1965 in L'Hospitalet de Llobregat, and was diagnosed with Spina bifida. His father was from Extremadura. He earned a licentiate degree on Information Sciences (Journalism) from the Autonomous University of Barcelona. He began nonetheless a professional acting career in comedy theatre group La Cubana. He also worked with television production company El Terrat, of which he was a board member.

His feature film directorial debut Tapas, co-helmed along with Juan Cruz, earned him a Goya Award for Best New Director. He also directed his sophomore picture Cowards along with Cruz. His television work, in various capacities, include Homo Zapping, Pelotas, Buenafuente, and Un nuevo amanecer.
