= Whirlpool (1970 film) =

1970 Danish film by José Ramón

- Theatrical release poster
- Directed by: José Ramón Larraz
- Screenplay by: José Ramón Larraz
- Story by: Sam Lomberg
- Produced by: Sam Lomberg
- Starring: Karl Lanchbury; Vivian Neves; Pia Andersson
- Cinematography: Julio Pérez de Rozas
- Edited by: Carlo Reali
- Music by: Stelvio Cipriani
- Production company: Athena Films A.S.
- Distributed by: Cinemation Industries
- Release date: 18 September 1970 (Boston)
- Running time: 87 minutes
- Countries: Denmark; United Kingdom
- Language: English

Whirlpool (also known as She Died with Her Boots On and Whirlpool of Sex) is a 1970 exploitation thriller film written and directed by José Ramón Larraz, (Note: Credited as "J. R. Larrath".) in his directorial debut, and starring Karl Lanchbury, Vivian Neves and Pia Andersson. Made in England by a Spanish director for a Danish production company (Athena Films), it was distributed in the USA by Cinemation Industries, whose owner, Jerry Gross, gave himself a 'Presented by' credit.

== Plot ==
Sarah, a middle-aged photographer, lives in the country outside London with Theo, an aspiring photographer whom she has taken in. The pair refer to one another as aunt and nephew, respectively. While at the studio, Sara meets Tulia, a young fashion model, whom she invites to come stay at her home so that Theo can photograph her. Tulia and Theo have a photo session in the woods, but it is aborted after Tulia witnesses a cloaked figure spying on her. The figure vanishes, and Tulia becomes frightened.

That evening, Tulia recounts to her hosts how her friend, Rhonda—also a model and acquaintance who spent time at Sarah's home—commented on being frightened while staying there. In particular, she was bothered by the nearby lake, which she found inexplicably ominous. Shortly after returning to London, Rhonda apparently vanished. As the night draws on, the three have drinks and play a game of cards, which culminates in Tulia and Sarah undressing. Theo and Tulia begin to kiss, and Sarah retires to her bedroom, where she stares longingly at photographs of Rhonda.

Tulia is tormented by nightmares involving Theo and Rhonda. In the morning, Sarah chastises Theo for not bringing Tulia into her room so that they could engage in a threesome. An inspector, Mr. Field, arrives and confronts Theo in search of Rhonda, who has disappeared. Theo claims Rhonda told him she planned to move to Italy after leaving Sarah's house. Theo brings Tulia to a local pub, where he offers a man a sum of money. Theo brings the man and Tulia to a secluded area in the woods and allows the man to initiate what is an apparent sexual assault on Tulia, as he photographs it. The man stops short of raping Tula, and, realizing that Theo staged this is a mere photo opportunity, Tulia is disgusted and demands to be returned to London.

Theo returns Tulia to the house, where Sarah calms her. Later that night, Sarah and Tulia have sex as Theo photographs it. This eventually culminates in a threesome. Meanwhile, Mr. Field cases Sarah's house, accidentally knocking over a bucket while attempting to look inside. The noise alerts Theo, who quickly goes outside to investigate. Theo chases Mr. Field into the woods to his car, where he stabs him to death.

While Theo disposes of Mr. Field's corpse, Sarah and Tulia are left alone, unaware of what has transpired. Sarah falls asleep, after which Tulia goes into the basement of the home to investigate Theo's darkroom. There, she uncovers disturbing photographs of Rhonda being raped and murdered by Theo, the man from the pub, and a tramp who resides in town. After killing Rhonda, the men disposed of her corpse in the lake. Theo returns to the house and confronts a horrified Tulia, confessing that he is a sadist. Just as he attempts to stab Tulia, she hits him with a developing tray and manages to flee the house, running into the woods. Theo eventually corners her, forcing her against a fallen tree, where he fondles and kisses her while viciously stabbing her to death.

== Cast ==
- Karl Lanchbury as Theo
- Vivien Neves as Tulia
- Pia Andersson as Sarah
- Johanna Hegger as Rhonda Clive
- Andrew Grant as Tom
- Edwin Brown as Mr. Field
- Ernest C. Jennings as Old Tramp
- Larry Dann as Pub Landlord
- Alan Charles as Eric

== Release ==
The film was first seen in the USA on 18 September 1970. In the UK, a 70-minute version, titled She Died With Her Boots On, was distributed by Edwin J. Fancey, first appearing on 21 March 1971.

== Reception ==
The Monthly Film Bulletin wrote: "A Danish production filmed – somewhat surprisingly – in England, and emerging as a permissive updating of the best (or worst) Victorian melodrama, complete with over-emphatic gestures, pregnant pauses and sinister glances. Irrelevant appearances from one or two minor characters and the generally erratic continuity are the result of substantial cutting in the version showing here, which – after a sluggish exposition – gains in speed and impact for the later lurid developments."

Roger Ebert called it a "genuinely sickening film. It has to do with various varieties of sex, yes, but its main appeal seems to be its violence... The violence is not, however, the cathartic sort to be found in The Wild Bunch or the comic strip spaghetti Westerns. It's a particularly grisly sort of violence, photographed for its own sake and deliberately relishing in its ugliness. It made me awfully uneasy."

== Home media ==
Whirlpool was unavailable in home media formats until it was released on Blu-ray as part of a three-film set of director Larraz's early features, entitled "Blood Hunger", by Arrow Films. The Blu-ray edition was sourced from a print held by the UCLA Film and Television Archive in Los Angeles.
