= Tapas (film) =

- Theatrical release poster
- Directed by: José Corbacho; Juan Cruz
- Screenplay by: José Corbacho; Juan Cruz
- Produced by: Luisa Matienzo; Julio Fernández
- Starring: Ángel de Andrés; María Galiana; Elvira Mínguez; Rubén Ochandiano; Alberto de Mendoza; Darío Paso; Alberto Jo Lee; Amparo Moreno; Anna Barrachina; Blanca Apilánez; Pilar Arcas
- Cinematography: Guillermo Granillo
- Edited by: David Gallart
- Music by: Pablo Sala
- Production companies: Castelao Productions; Tusitala PC
- Release dates: 23 April 2005 (Málaga); 13 May 2005 (Spain)
- Countries: Spain; Argentina; Mexico
- Language: Spanish

Tapas is a 2005 comedy film written and directed by José Corbacho and Juan Cruz.

== Plot ==
The film centers on a Spanish tapas bar and the love lives of the loosely interconnected people in the neighborhood surrounding the bar. The pairs of lovers include a middle aged woman and a young man; an elderly, drug dealing woman and her terminally ill husband in poor health; the tapas bar owner and his estranged wife; and two Chinese immigrants.

== Cast ==
- Ángel de Andrés as Lolo
- María Galiana as Conchi
- Elvira Mínguez as Raquel
- Rubén Ochandiano as César
- Alberto de Mendoza as Mariano
- Darío Paso as Opo
- Alberto Jo Lee as Mao
- Amparo Moreno as Rosalía
- Blanca Apilánez as Carmen
- Anna Barrachina as Águeda
- Pilar Arcas
- Rosario Pardo as Carmela
- Cecilia Rossetto
- Ferran Adrià
- Eduardo Blanco

== Production ==
A Spanish-Argentine-Mexican co-production, the film was produced by Castelao Productions and Tusitala PC. Shooting locations included the Santa Eulália neighborhood in L'Hospitalet de Llobregat.

== Release ==
Tapas was presented at the Málaga Film Festival in April 2005. It was theatrically released in Spain on 13 May 2005.

== Accolades ==
Year	Award	Category	Nominee(s)	Result	Ref.
2005	8th Málaga Film Festival	Golden Biznaga		Won	
2005	8th Málaga Film Festival	Best Actress	Elvira Mínguez	Won	
2005	8th Málaga Film Festival	Audience Award		Won	
2006	20th Goya Awards	Best New Director	José Corbacho, Juan Cruz	Won	
2006	20th Goya Awards	Best Supporting Actress	Elvira Mínguez	Won	
2006	15th Actors and Actresses Union Awards	Best Film Actress in a Secondary Role	Elvira Mínguez	Won	
2006	1st Sur Awards	Best Supporting Actor	Eduardo de Mendoza	Nominated	
2007	55th Silver Condor Awards	Best Ibero-American Film		Nominated	

== See also ==
- List of Spanish films of 2005
