= A Good Man (2009 film) =

- Theatrical release poster
- Spanish: Un buen hombre
- Directed by: Juan Martínez Moreno
- Screenplay by: Juan Martínez Moreno
- Produced by: Gerardo Herrero; Mariela Besuievsky; Javier López Blanco
- Starring: Tristán Ulloa; Emilio Gutiérrez Caba; Nathalie Poza; Alberto Jiménez
- Cinematography: Gonzalo Berridi
- Edited by: Fernando Pardo
- Music by: Sergio Moure
- Production companies: Milú Films; Castafiore Films; Tornasol Films
- Distributed by: Alta Films
- Release dates: 19 April 2009 (Málaga); 30 April 2009 (Spain)
- Country: Spain
- Language: Spanish

A Good Man (Spanish: Un buen hombre) is a 2009 Spanish thriller film directed and written by Juan Martínez Moreno which stars Tristán Ulloa and Emilio Gutiérrez Caba alongside Nathalie Poza and Alberto Jiménez.

== Plot ==
The plot explores the moral dilemma experienced by staunchly Conservative law lecturer Vicente (close to getting a chair) as he witnesses colleague, professor, close friend and father figure Fernando killing her wife Paula in cold blood.

== Cast ==
- Tristán Ulloa as Vicente
- Emilio Gutiérrez Caba as Fernando
- Nathalie Poza as Paula
- Alberto Jiménez as Daniel
- Miguel de Lira as teniente ('lieutenant')
- Jorge Ricoy as decano ('dean')
- Noelia Soto as Marisa

== Production ==
The film is a Milú Films, Castafiore Films, and Tornasol Films production. Shooting locations included the Ciudad de la Luz studio in Alicante as well as the province of A Coruña, Galicia.

== Release ==
Alta Films acquired distribution rights in Spain from Latido Films. The film was presented at the 12th Málaga Film Festival on 19 April 2009. It was released theatrically in Spain on 30 April 2009.

== Reception ==
Mirito Torreiro of Fotogramas rated the film 1 out of 5 stars, citing an awful writing with "laughable" situations as the worst thing about the film, while singling out Ulloa's performance (a career's best) as a positive element.

Javier Ocaña of El País deemed A Good Man to be a "failed" film, which despite a first hour "described with a certain verisimilitude, enhanced by the good work of the [actors playing the] four main characters" ends ups falling apart, featuring a nonsensical scene under the rain.

Irene Crespo of Cinemanía rated the film 2½ out of 5 stars, underscoring it to be "a correct psychological thriller corroded by guilt".

== See also ==
- List of Spanish films of 2009
