= You Would Do It Too =

2023 Spanish television series

- Spanish: Tú también lo harías
- Created by: David Victori; Jordi Vallejo
- Written by: David Victori; Jordi Vallejo
- Directed by: David Victori
- Starring: Pablo Molinero; Ana Polvorosa; Michelle Jenner; Paco Tous; Ana Wagener; Elena Irureta; Mirela Balić; Xavi Sáez; José Manuel Poga; Chechu Salgado; Viti Suárez; Pilar Bergés
- Country of origin: Spain
- Original language: Spanish
- No. of episodes: 8

Production
- Running time: c. 30 min
- Production companies: Legendary Television; ESPotlight

Original release
- Network: Disney+
- Release: 23 April 2023

You Would Do It Too (Spanish: Tú también lo harías) is a 2023 mystery thriller television miniseries created and written by David Victori and Jordi Vallejo. It features Pablo Molinero, Ana Polvorosa, Michelle Jenner, Paco Tous, Ana Wagener and, Elena Irureta, among others.

== Plot ==
Following a botched robbery attempt on a bus linking El Prat Airport with Manresa in which three robbers were killed, police agents Garza and Quirós inquire the six witnesses about the identity of the fugitives on the run and what actually happened on the bus that night. Meanwhile, the case goes viral and the public opinion sides with the killer.

== Cast ==
- Pablo Molinero as Fran Garza
- Ana Polvorosa as Rebeca Quirós
- Michelle Jenner as Elisa Peña
- Paco Tous as Manuel Navas
- Ana Wagener as Victoria Jordán
- Elena Irureta as Marga
- Mirela Balić as Leyre Palacios
- Xavi Sáez as Jandro
- José Manuel Poga as Dante Bazán
- Chechu Salgado as Coco
- Viti Suárez as Balter Bayona
- Pilar Bergés as Miren

== Production ==
The series was created by David Victori and Jordi Vallejo. It is a Legendary Television and ESPotlight production. Despite the fiction being set in Catalonia, it does not feature the regional police force Mossos d'Esquadra but an indeterminate law enforcement body. Shooting primarily took place in Barcelona and Manresa. The series features 8 episodes with an average runtime of 30 minutes.

== Release ==
The series was released in Spain by Disney+ on 26 April 2023. In September 2024, it was reported that Apple TV+ had acquired global rights to the series, aiming for a 30 October 2024 debut.

== Reception ==
María Bescós of HobbyConsolas rated the series with 65 points ('acceptable'), citing how the series "knows how to create intrigue from the beginning" as a positive point.
