= Tripictures =

Spanish film distribution company

- Industry: Entertainment
- Founded: 1987; 39 years ago
- Headquarters: Madrid, Spain
- Products: Motion pictures
- Services: Film distribution/production

Tripictures is a Spanish film distribution and production company. It is based in Madrid.

== History ==
Tripictures was founded in 1987 by Felipe Ortiz, Pepe Hueva and Luis Ortiz. In 1995, Tripictures reached a deal with Mandalay Pictures for the release of their films in the Spanish market, while the company inked another deal with New Line Cinema in 2001. Tripictures ventured into international co-production with a minority stake on Asterix at the Olympic Games. In 2006, mass media group Vocento acquired a majority stake (67%) in Tripictures. In 2013, Tripictures and DeAPlaneta reached an agreement for the Spanish distribution of DreamWorks films. In 2014, Vocento disinvested in the distribution business of Tripictures to cut losses, selling to Tripictures International (chaired by Tripictures CEO Felipe Ortiz) while retaining control over the portfolio. Tripictures later reached an agreement with Netflix for a limited theatrical window of some Netflix original films in select screens before hitting the streaming release (in force since 2019).

== Releases ==
Filmax films released in the 2020s
| Release date (Note: The listed date refers to the film's theatrical release in Spain by Tripictures, not necessarily its first screening or when it premiered.) | Title | Director(s) | Ref. |
|---|---|---|---|
| 10 February 2012 | Dark Impulse | Mariano Barroso | |
| 15 October 2021 | The Good Boss | Fernando León de Aranoa | |
| 18 February 2022 | CODA | Siân Heder | |
| 15 September 2023 | All the Names of God | Daniel Calparsoro | |
| 15 December 2023 | Society of the Snow | J.A. Bayona | |
| 30 August 2024 | The Crow | Rupert Sanders | |
| 27 September 2024 | Megalopolis | Francis Ford Coppola | |
| 29 November 2024 | Desmontando a Lucía | Alberto Utrera | |
| 1 January 2025 | Better Man | Michael Gracey | |
| 24 January 2025 | Bad Influence | Chloé Wallace | |
| 30 May 2025 | The Fabulous Four | Jocelyn Moorhouse | |
| 5 September 2025 | The Talent | Polo Menárguez | |
| 10 October 2025 | The Truce | Miguel Ángel Vivas | |
| 5 December 2025 | Wolf Beach | Javier Veiga | |
