= Dark Impulse =

- Theatrical release poster
- Spanish: Lo mejor de Eva
- Directed by: Mariano Barroso
- Screenplay by: Alejandro Hernández; Mariano Barroso
- Starring: Leonor Watling; Miguel Ángel Silvestre; Nathalie Poza; Adriana Ugarte; Helio Pedregal; Josean Bengoetxea
- Cinematography: David Omedes
- Edited by: Pablo Más
- Music by: Arnau Bataller
- Production companies: Telecinco Cinema; Lo mejor de Eva AIE; Malvarrosa Media; Sentido Films; Kasbah PC
- Distributed by: Tripictures
- Release date: 10 February 2012
- Country: Spain
- Language: Spanish

Dark Impulse (Spanish: Lo mejor de Eva) is a 2012 Spanish erotic thriller film directed by Mariano Barroso, which stars Leonor Watling and Miguel Ángel Silvestre alongside Nathalie Poza, Adriana Ugarte, Helio Pedregal and Josean Bengoetxea.

== Plot ==
Featuring the backdrop of corruption and careerism, the plot tracks the relationship between Eva, an implacable judge, and Rocco, an alluring male prostitute serving as a protected witness.

== Cast ==
- Leonor Watling as Eva
- Miguel Ángel Silvestre as Rocco
- Nathalie Poza as Berta
- Adriana Ugarte as Marta
- Helio Pedregal as Peña
- Josean Bengoetxea as Iñaki
- José Luis Torrijo as Carmelo

== Production ==
The screenplay was penned by co-penned by Mariano Barroso and Alejandro Hernández. Dark Impulse was produced by Telecinco Cinema and Lo mejor de Eva AIE production, in collaboration with Malvarrosa Media, Sentido Films and Kasbah PC. It was shot in Madrid and Valencia. David Omedes was responsible for cinematography whereas Pablo Más served as film editor. The film was scored by Arnau Bataller. Shooting started in October 2010 and wrapped by December 2010.

== Release ==
Distributed by Tripictures, the film was theatrically released in Spain on 10 February 2012.

== Reception ==
Nuria Vidal of Fotogramas rated the film with a 3 out of 5 stars score, highlighting the chemistry between the two leads as the film's best selling point, while pointing out at certain television movie resemblances as a negative point.

Javier Ocaña of El País observed a linearity in the male prostitute's character (who starts the film the same way as he ends it) and the absence of a real climax, yet, imperfections and some sequences lacking in plausibility notwithstanding, considered the film "never slackens in its rhythm and it is commanded by a very adequate acting couple."

Jordi Batlle Caminal of La Vanguardia gave Dark Impulse 2 out 5 stars, deeming it to be a "convincingly crafted film but unable of instilling emotions in the viewer", declaring to be amused by the final plot twist.

== See also ==
- List of Spanish films of 2012
