= Rubén Ochandiano =

Spanish actor and director (born 1980)

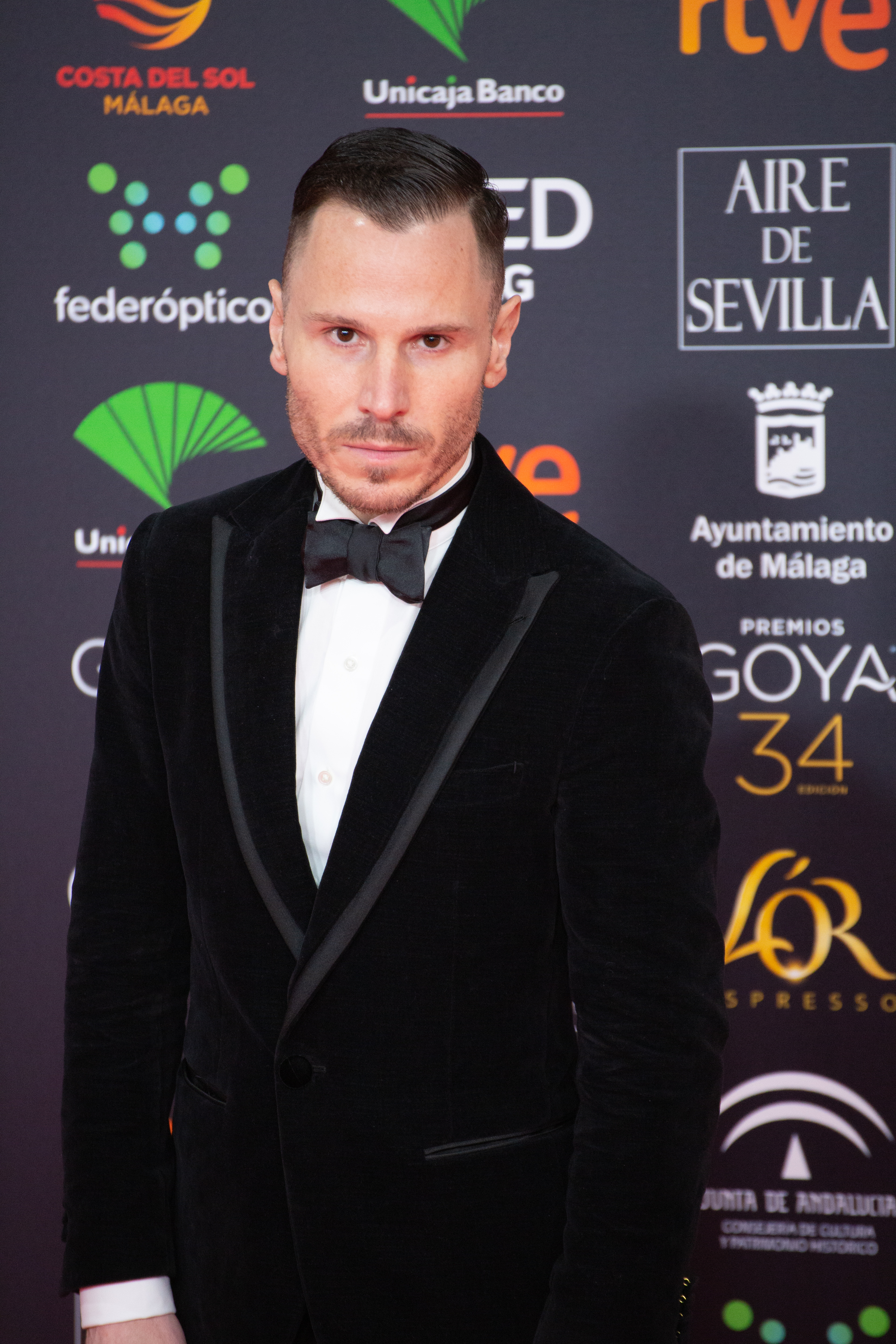
- Ochandiano at the 34th Goya Awards
- Born: Rubén Ochandiano de Higes; 3 October 1980 (age 44); Madrid, Spain
- Occupation: Actor

Rubén Ochandiano de Higes (born 3 October 1980) is a Spanish actor.

== Life and career ==
Rubén Ochandiano de Higes was born in Madrid on 3 October 1980. He is the nephew of actress and stage director Amelia Ochandiano. He trained as an actor under Juan Carlos Corazza and Manuel Morón.

Ochandiano played bit parts in television series such as Médico de familia and Periodistas until landing a breakthrough role in high school soap opera Al salir de clase, portraying Marcos, the shy nephew of the school's principal, from 1999 to 2000.

Ochandiano made his film debut in Flowers from Another World (1999). His performance in Maquis-themed drama Broken Silence (2001) as a sheep herder earned him a nomination for a Goya Award for Best New Actor. In the film, his character is forced by a policeman to drink a whole bottle of castor oil in a bar. In 2006, he played an anarchist in the television miniseries Vientos de agua. He portrayed "perverse and twisted" archbishop Oliva in historical drama series Toledo, cruce de destinos. In 2018, he was invited to join the AMPAS. In 2019, he appeared as an intermediate trader in the last three episodes of season one of Belgian-Dutch narcoseries Undercover, returning for season 2.

== Selected filmography ==
Year	Title	Role	Notes	Ref.
1999	Flores de otro mundo (Flowers from Another World)	Oscar	Feature film debut	
2000	Asfalto	Miguel		
2001	Silencio roto (Broken Silence)	Sebas		
2002	Amnèsia (Amnesia)	Jorge		
2002	Guerreros	Sargento Rubio		
2003	Descongélate! (Chill Out!)	Berto		
2003	La flaqueza del bolchevique (The Weakness of the Bolshevik)	Manu		
2005	Tapas	César		
2007	Tuya siempre (Always Yours)	Alfredo		
2009	Los abrazos rotos (Broken Embraces)	Ray X / Ernesto Jr.		
2010	Biutiful	Zanc		
2011	No tengas miedo (Don't Be Afraid)	Toni		
2015	Vulcania	Olmo		
2015	Incidencias (Stranded)	Carlos		
2016	The Infiltrator	Gonzalo Mora Jr.		
2019	وُلِدَ مَلِكاً (Born a King)	Al-Thunayan		
2019	El silencio de la ciudad blanca (Twin Murders: The Silence of the White City)	Eneko		
2021	Hombre muerto no sabe vivir (A Dead Man Cannot Live)	Ángel		
2021	Y todos arderán (Everyone Will Burn)	Juan		
2022	Sin ti no puedo	Rafa		
2023	Lobo feroz	Elías		
2024	Daniela Forever	Garrido		

== Accolades ==
Year	Award	Category	Work	Result	Ref.
2002	16th Goya Awards	Best New Actor	Broken Silence	Nominated	
2004	13th Actors and Actresses Union Awards	Best Film Actor in a Minor Role	The Weakness of the Bolshevik	Nominated	
