= Pelotas (TV series) =

- Created by: José Corbacho; Juan Cruz
- Country of origin: Spain
- Original language: Spanish
- No. of seasons: 2
- No. of episodes: 24

Production
- Production company: El Terrat for Televisión Española

Original release
- Network: La 1
- Release: 23 February 2009 – 7 June 2010

Pelotas (Balls) is a Spanish tragicomedy television series created by José Corbacho and Juan Cruz. It was broadcast on La 1 of Televisión Española, between 23 February 2009 and 7 June 2010.

The series recounts the lives of local Unión Fútbol Club supporters in Hospitalet de Llobregat, a suburb of Barcelona.

== Cast ==
- Ángel de Andrés López
- Javier Albalá
- Belén Lopez
- Celia Freijeiro
- David Fernández Ortiz
- Alberto Jo Lee
