= ...And Give Us Our Daily Sex =

1979 film by José Ramón Larraz

- Directed by: José Ramón Larraz
- Screenplay by: José Ramón Larraz; Sergio Garrone
- Produced by: José María Cunillés; Vincenzo Salviani
- Starring: Laura Gemser; Bárbara Rey; Mila Stanic; José Castillo; Alfred Lucchetti; José Sazatornil; Daniele Vargas; Gabriele Tinti
- Cinematography: Roberto Girometti
- Edited by: José Luis Matesanz
- Music by: Ubaldo Continiello
- Production companies: Estela Films; Ízaro Films
- Release dates: 26 February 1979 (Spain); 5 December 1979 (Italy)
- Running time: 84 minutes
- Countries: Italy; Spain
- Language: Spanish

...And Give Us Our Daily Sex (Italian: Malizia erotica, Spanish: El periscopio) is a 1979 Italian-Spanish film directed by José Ramón Larraz, written by Larraz and Sergio Garrone, and starring Laura Gemser and Bárbara Rey.

== Plot ==
Alfonso is a teenager who lives in a wealthy family, with an adulterous mother and a foolish father. As he experiences his first sexual impulses, Alfonso discovers that a couple of charming nurses live upstairs in his apartment, so he will look for any excuse to get in touch with them, including building a handmade periscope to spy on them.

== Cast ==
- Laura Gemser as Verónica's Friend
- Bárbara Rey as Verónica
- Ángel Herraiz as Alfonso
- Mila Stanic as Carla, Alfonso's Mother
- José Castillo as Don Ignacio, Alfonso's Father
- Alfred Lucchetti as Carla's Lover (credited as Alfredo Luchetti)
- José Sazatornil as José Antonio Cañavate (credited as José Sazatornil 'Saza')
- José María Cañete as Editorial Employee (credited as José Mª Cañete)
- Francisco Jarque as Pawn Shop Clerk
- Daniele Vargas as Oculist (credited as Danielle Vargas)
- Jordi Bofill as Leatherworking Owner (uncredited)
- Manuel Bronchud as False Policeman (uncredited)
- Mir Ferry as Hairdresser (uncredited)
- Amparo Moreno as Felisa (uncredited)
- Gabriele Tinti as Professor (uncredited)
- Arnau Vilardebó as Hairdresser Client (uncredited)

== Production ==
The film is part of a wave of softcore pornographic films made in Spain during the second half of the 1970s, part of a cultural trend known as el destape ("the uncovering"). It is one of a group of Italy-Spain softcore film co-productions, alongside Historia de Eva/Piccole labbra (1978), both featuring Bárbara Rey.

The film is one of Gemser's films that features her husband Gabriele Tinti in a minor role.

== Release ==
The film was released in Spain on 26 February 1979 and in Italy on 5 December 1979. It was released in Mexico at the Bergman, Chaplin II, Del Pueblo II and Kubrick theaters on 23 December 1983, for two weeks.

It was released in Germany as Zeig mir, wie man's macht ("Show me how to do it").
