= Aliseda =

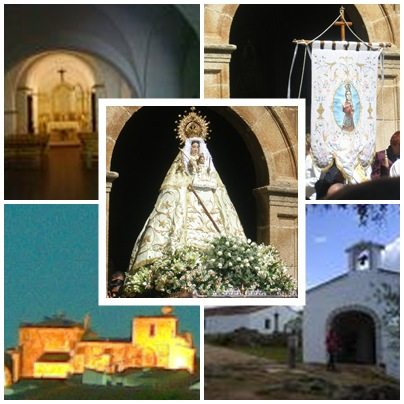

- Flag Coat of arms

- Location of Aliseda within Spain Aliseda (Europe)
- Coordinates: 39°25′21″N 6°41′34″W
- Country: Spain
- Province: Cáceres

Area
  - Total: 81 km^{2} (31 sq mi)
- Elevation: 351 m (1,152 ft)

Population (2025-01-01)
  - Total: 1,726
  - Density: 21/km^{2} (55/sq mi)
- Demonym: Aliseños
- Postal code: 10550
- Website: www.aliseda.es

Aliseda is a municipality in the province of Cáceres and autonomous community of Extremadura, Spain. The municipality covers an area of 81 square kilometres (31 sq mi) and as of 2011 had a population of 2013 people.

In 1920 a treasure of great historical significance was found in Aliseda. The discovery of the Treasure of Aliseda in 1920 revealed that the origin of the town belonged to a period before Christ, as it found traces from the Late Bronze Age at the top of the Sierra del Aljibe.

== See also ==
- List of municipalities in Cáceres
