= Un nuevo amanecer =

- Promotional release poster
- Created by: José Corbacho
- Written by: José Corbacho; Enric Pardo; Rafel Barceló
- Directed by: José Corbacho; Belén Macías
- Starring: Yolanda Ramos
- Music by: Frank Montasell; Lucas Peire
- No. of episodes: 8

Production
- Executive producers: Montse García; Anxo Rodríguez; Paula Cobo
- Cinematography: Andalu V.S.J.; Tito Arcas
- Production companies: Atresmedia Televisión; Espotlight Media

Original release
- Network: Atresplayer
- Release: 10 March 2024

Un nuevo amanecer (transl. 'A New Dawn') is a Spanish tragicomedy television series created by José Corbacho which stars Yolanda Ramos. It debuted on Atresplayer on 10 March 2024.

== Plot ==
The plot follows substance-abusing television personality Candela, who has just hit rock bottom upon appearing as a jury member in a talent show. She ensuingly ends up in a humble detox centre while navigating issues with her mother and her daughter.

== Cast ==
- Yolanda Ramos as Candela Nieto
- Vicky Peña
- Alicia Falcó
- Cecilia Freire
- Àgata Roca
- Pau Durà
- Abril Zamora
- Judit Martín
- Artur Busquets
- Bruno Oro
- David Selvas
- Anne Igartiburu as herself
- La Terremoto de Alcorcón as herself
- José Corbacho as himself

== Production ==
The series was produced by Atresmedia Televisión alongside Espotlight Media. Created, written, and directed by José Corbacho, Belén Macías joined the former in direction duties.

== Release ==
The series was presented on 8 March 2024 during the 27th Málaga Film Festival, with the pre-screening of two episodes at the Cine Albéniz. The 8-episode series debuted on Atresplayer on 10 March 2024.

== See also ==
- 2024 in Spanish television
