= José Ramón Larraz =

Spanish film director (1929–2013)

- Born: José Ramón Larraz Gil; 1929; Barcelona, Spain
- Died: 3 September 2013 (aged 84); Málaga, Spain
- Occupation(s): Screenwriter, Film director and producer
- Years active: 1970–2002

José Ramón Larraz Gil (1929 – 3 September 2013) was a Spanish director of exploitation and horror films such as the erotic and bloody Vampyres (1974), The House that Vanished (1973), Symptoms (1974), Black Candles (1982) and Rest in Pieces (1987) among others.

== Biography ==
=== Early life ===
Born in Barcelona, Larraz earned a Doctor of Philosophy degree and moved to Paris in 1952, where he started his career as a comics writer for magazines like Pilote and Spirou. His most known creation was the action-comic series "Paul Foran", which he wrote under the name "Gil" and also made some artistic contributions to.

=== Career ===
Larraz moved to England, where he began making films, then in 1976 apparently relocated his operations back to Spain. He made many different types of films, but is best known for his horror films. Symptoms was an official British entry at the 1974 Cannes Film Festival. His last few horror films were Spanish-American co-productions. He apparently retired from filmmaking in 1992 at age 63.

=== Death ===
Larraz died, aged 84, in Málaga on 3 September 2013.

== Filmography ==
Year	Title	Notes	Ref.
1970	Whirlpool	Directorial debut as J R Larrath	
1971	Deviation	Credited as J R Larrath	
1973	La muerte incierta	Credited as José R Larraz	
1973	The House That Vanished	Alternative titles: Scream and Die; Don't Go in the Bedroom. Credited as Joseph Larraz	
1974	Emma, puertas oscuras	Alternative title: Emma, Dark Doors. Credited as José R Larraz	
1974	Symptoms	Alternative title: Blood Virgin. Credited as Joseph Larraz	
1974	Vampyres	Alternative titles: Daughters of Dracula; Blood Hunger; Daughters of Darkness. Credited as Joseph Larraz	
1977	El fin de la inocencia		
1977	Luto riguroso		
1977	El mirón		
1978	The Coming of Sin	Alternative title: The Violation of the Bitch	
1978	La ocasión		
1979	El periscopio		
1979	Polvos mágicos	Alternative title: Lady Lucifera	
1979	The Golden Lady		
1980	Estigma	Alternative title: Stigma	
1981	Madame Olga's Pupils	Credited as Joseph L Bronstein	
1981	La momia nacional	Alternative title: The National Mummy	
1982	Black Candles	Alternative titles: Sex Rites of the Devil; Los ritos sexuales del diablo. Credited as Joseph Braunstein	
1983	Juana la loca ... de vez en cuando		
1985	Goya	TV mini-series in 6 episodes	
1987	Rest in Pieces	Credited as Joseph Braunstein	
1988	Edge of the Axe	Credited as Joseph Braunstein	
1990	Deadly Manor	Alternative title: Savage Lust. Credited as Joseph Larraz	
1992	Sevilla Connection		
2002	Viento del pueblo	TV mini-series in 2 episodes	

== Sources ==
- Cooper, Ian (2016). Frightmares: A History of British Horror Cinema. New York City, New York: Columbia University Press. ISBN 978-0-993-07174-4.
- Craig, Rob (2019). American International Pictures: A Comprehensive Filmography. Jefferson, North Carolina: McFarland. ISBN 978-1-476-66631-0.
- Smith, Gary A. (2006). Uneasy Dreams: The Golden Age of British Horror Films, 1956–1976. Jefferson, North Carolina: McFarland. ISBN 978-1-476-60530-2.
