= Chiringuito =

Spanish small beach bars

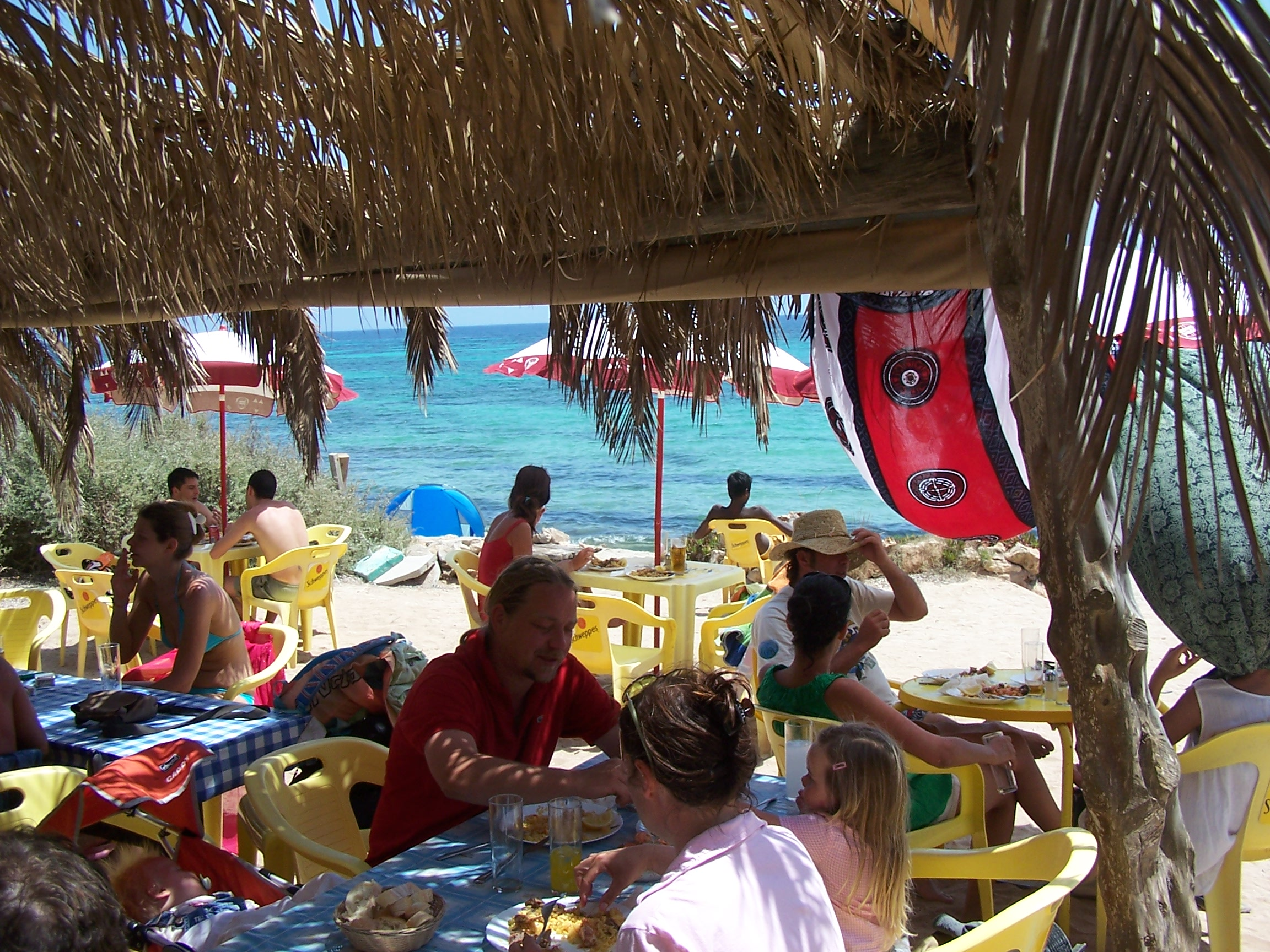
A chiringuito in Formentera.

In Spain, a chiringuito (Spanish pronunciation: [t͡ʃiɾinˈɡito]) is a small beach bar, selling mainly drinks and snacks, and sometimes meals or tapas, in a more or less provisional building, since a more permanent structure on the beach may not be viable.

They are mainly found on beaches or at tourist attractions, which enjoy only brief but intense seasonal activity. These can be solid structures but are more often no-frills shelters or simply stalls capable of commanding a price premium compared to regular suppliers, as well as high turnover, yielding reasonable profits over a short span of time.

Since many chiringuito bars tend (or tended) to operate in the informal sector of the economy, the term is sometimes extended to any dodgy business activity or company that operates in loosely regulated grey markets or the unlawful black market sector. The slang can also be used in Spain to make fun of a legitimate, lawful and compliant company that is however very weak or small, with little expectations of growing or surviving in the markets at short or mid term.

In Mexico, an equivalent could be a palapa.

== See also ==
- Food booth
- Kiosk
- Farmers' market
- Flea market
