= Eva Martín =

Eva Martín may refer to:

- Eva Martín (actress) (born 1974), Spanish actress
- Eva Martín (athlete), competed in 1988 Rhythmic Gymnastics European Championships et al.
- Eva Martín Pérez (born 1971), Spanish politician
