= Bárbara Rey =

Spanish film and television actress (born 1950)

- Born: María Margarita García García; 2 February 1950 (age 76); Totana, Murcia, Spain
- Occupation: Actress
- Years active: 1969-present

María Margarita García García (Totana, Murcia, Spain, 2 February 1950), better known as Bárbara Rey, is a Spanish film and television actress. She is the daughter of Andrés García Valenzuela and Salvadora García Molina.

Rey represented Spain at the 21st annual Miss World pageant under her original name María García.

Her real fame came in 1975 with the TV program Palmarés which made her a sex-symbol. After that she appeared in many revues in theatres. In the 1970s she became an icon of the destape films (films where Spaniards could see naked women in film for the first time after Francoist censorship ended).

In the 1980s she appeared in many revues and TV shows such as Primera función (1989) or Pero ¿esto qué es? (1989) Since the 2000s she became a regular guest of gossip TV shows and she also appeared as contestant in some reality shows such as Esta cocina es un infierno, in Telecinco, or Acorralados.

== Personal life ==
In 1980 she married lion tamer Ángel Cristo with whom she had two children, Ángel Cristo Jr. (1981) and Sofía Cristo (1983). They worked together in his circus in different shows. He was a drunk and abusive towards Bárbara. They divorced in 1988.

Between 1976 and 1994, she had an extramarital romantic relationship with King Juan Carlos I.

== Work ==
=== Filmography ===
- Los cien caballeros (1969)
- La vida sigue igual (1969)
- Crimen imperfecto (1970)
- A mí las mujeres ni fu ni fa (1971), by Mariano Ozores.
- París bien vale una moza (1972)
- La llamaban la Madrina (1973), by Mariano Ozores.
- Separación matrimonial (1973), by Angelino Fons.
- El consejero (1973)
- La llamaban "La Madrina" (1973)
- La noche de los brujos (1973)
- The Girl from the Red Cabaret (1973)
- The Ghost Galleon (1974), by Amando de Ossorio.
- El amor empieza a medianoche (1974), de Pedro Lazaga.
- El chulo (1974)
- Onofre (1974), by Luis María Delgado.
- Zorrita Martínez (1975), by Vicente Escrivá.
- Mi mujer es muy decente, dentro de lo que cabe (1975), de Antonio Drove.
- Cuando Conchita se escapa, no hay tocata (1976), by Luis María Delgado.
- La viuda andaluza (1976)
- Deseo (1976)
- Call Girl: La vida privada de una señorita bien (1976)
- La muerte ronda a Mónica (1976), junto a su gran amiga Jenny Llada
- Las delicias de los verdes años (1976), de Antonio Mercero.
- Virilidad a la española (1976), de Francisco Lara Polop.
- Carne apaleada (1977), de Javier Aguirre.
- Me siento extraña (1977), de Enrique Martí Maqueda.
- Desnuda ante el espejo (1977)
- Cuentos de las sábanas blancas (1977)
- Virilidad a la española (1977)
- La escopeta nacional (1978), by Luis García Berlanga.
- Rostros (1978)
- Puerco mundo (1978)
- Historia de Eva (1978)
- ...And Give Us Our Daily Sex (1979), by José Ramón Larraz.
- Mi adúltero esposo (1978)
- Piccole Labbra (1978)
- Unos granujas decentes (1980)

=== Television ===
as host

- Especial nochevieja (1975)
- Palmarés (1976)
- Esto es espectáculo (1994-1996)
- En casa de Bárbara (2000-2005)
- Murcia, qué hermosa eres (2005)

== Bibliography ==
- Mira, Alberto. The A to Z of Spanish Cinema. Rowman & Littlefield, 2010.
