= La unidad =

- Genre: Thriller; Police drama
- Created by: Dani de la Torre; Alberto Marini
- Directed by: Dani de la Torre; Oskar Santos
- Starring: Nathalie Poza; Michel Noher; Luis Zahera; Raúl Fernández; Carlos Blanco; Fele Martínez
- Country of origin: Spain
- Original languages: Spanish; French; Arabic
- No. of seasons: 3
- No. of episodes: 18

Production
- Executive producers: Domingo Corral; Fran Araújo; Ismael Calleja; Emma Lustres; Borja Pena
- Cinematography: Josu Inchaustegui
- Running time: 50 min (approx.)
- Production companies: Movistar+; Vaca Films

Original release
- Network: Movistar+
- Release: 15 May 2020 – 18 May 2023

La unidad (lit. 'The Unit') is a Spanish police thriller television series. Produced by Movistar+ in collaboration with Vaca Films, created by Dani de la Torre and Alberto Marini, and starring Nathalie Poza, Michel Noher, Luis Zahera, Raúl Fernández, Carlos Blanco and Fele Martínez, it was released on Movistar + on 15 May 2020. It was renewed for a second season on 22 May 2020, which was released on 18 March 2022. It then got renewed for a third and final series, titled Kabul.

== Premise ==
The plot follows an anti-terrorist special police unit of the General Commissariat of Information investigating a jihadist cell seeking to carry out a terrorist attack in Spain. The fiction is set in different locations such as France (Toulouse), Nigeria (Lagos), Syria (Raqqa), Tangiers, Melilla, Catalonia (Girona), Vigo and Madrid.

== Cast ==
- Nathalie Poza as Carla.
- Michel Noher as Marcos.
- Marian Álvarez as Miriam.
- Luis Zahera as Sergio.
- Fariba Sheikhan as Nawja.
- Raúl Fernández as Roberto.
- Carlos Blanco as Ramón.
- Fele Martínez as Sanabria.
- Amina Leony as Amina.
- Moussa Echarif as Myaz.

== Production and release ==
Created by Dani de la Torre and Alberto Marini, Dani de la Torre directed the episodes while Alberto Marini and Amèlia Mora authored the screenplay. Domingo Corral, Fran Araújo, Ismael Calleja, Emma Lustres and Borja Pena were credited as executive producers. Josu Inchaustegui worked as cinematography director.

The series is a Movistar+ production, in collaboration with Vaca Films. The budget of the series was in the top-tier of Movistar+'s productions, similar to that of La peste's first season, about 10 million €. While some outdoor shots were filmed in Nigeria, France and Tangiers, most of the filming (about 85%) took place in Galicia. Some scenes were filmed in Melilla and a complex terrorist attack scene was shot in Callao, Preciados and Sol in Madrid. The series, consisting of six 50-minute episodes, was released on 15 May 2020 on Movistar+, both in the subscription platform and the Movistar+ Lite VoD service.

Filming of Season 2 began in April 2021 and wrapped in July 2021. Oskar Santos and Dani de la Torre directed the episodes whereas the screenplay was written by Alberto Marini, Amèlia Mora, Alfred Pérez-Farga and Roger Danès.

== Accolades ==
Year	Award	Category	Nominee(s)	Result	Ref.
2021	8th MiM Series Awards	Best Drama Series		Won	
2021	8th MiM Series Awards	Best Direction	Dani de la Torre	Won	
2021	8th MiM Series Awards	Best Drama Actor	Luis Zahera	Nominated	
2021	8th MiM Series Awards	Best Drama Actress	Nathalie Poza	Nominated	
2022	28th Forqué Awards	Best TV Series		Nominated	
2023	10th Feroz Awards	Best Actress in a TV Series	Nathalie Poza	Nominated	
2023	10th Feroz Awards	Best Supporting Actress in a TV Series	Marian Álvarez	Nominated	
2023	10th Feroz Awards	Best Supporting Actor a TV Series	Luis Zahera	Nominated	
2023	31st Actors and Actresses Union Awards	Best Television Actress in a Leading Role	Nathalie Poza	Won	
2023	31st Actors and Actresses Union Awards	Best Television Actress in a Minor Role	Yassmine Othman	Won	
