= Juan Cruz (director) =

Spanish television/film director and screenwriter

Juan Cruz (born 1966) is a television and film director and screenwriter. He co-directed the 2005 film Tapas as his directorial film debut.

== Filmography ==
- Incidencias 2015
- Pelotas (TV series) 2009–2010
- Universos (TV series) 2008
- Cowards 2008
- XXI Premios Anuales de la Academia (TV special) 2007
- Tapas 2005
- Ratones coloraos (TV series) 2002
- Set de nit (TV series) 2001
- A pèl (TV series) 2001
- El olor de las manzanas (short) (writer) 1999
