= Talía Awards =

Spanish performing arts awards

- Awarded for: Best in performing arts
- Country: Spain
- Presented by: Academia de las Artes Escénicas de España
- First award: 2023
- Website: https://premiostalia.com/

The Talía Awards are presented annually by the Academy of Performing Arts of Spain to recognize excellence in the performing arts in Spain.

== History ==
Following the creation of the Academy of Performing Arts of Spain (Academia de las Artes Escénicas de España) in 2014, the academy held conversations with the Sociedad General de Autores y Editores (SGAE) for the transfer of the Max Awards brand, and the 2016 Max Awards edition modified its regulations to allow academy members to take part as jury members, but the voting body was very small back then, and the experiment was not repeated again. The first edition of the Talía Awards took place at the Teatro Español in March 2023. The trophy, a representation of Thalia, goddess of comedy, was designed by José Luis Puche. The first edition was criticised for claims of Madrid-centric bias. While the awards were due to hold their first three editions in Madrid in order to "settle down", academy president Cayetana Guillén Cuervo claimed that if the awards were "perceived to have become too centralized, we will take that into account next year", explaining that "decentralization" was one of the academy's goals. The second edition was again held at the Teatro Español on 22 April 2024.
