= Ángel Cristo =

Spanish circus performer (1944–2010)

Ángel Papadopoulos Dordi (17 October 1944 in Huelva – 4 May 2010 in Madrid) was a Spanish circus performer as lion tamer.

In 1980 he married Spanish film and television actress Bárbara Rey with whom he had two children, Ángel Cristo Jr. (1981) and Sofía Cristo (1983). They worked together in his circus in different shows. He was a drunk and abusive towards Bárbara. They divorced in 1988.

On 3 May 2010 he was admitted to the University Hospital of Alcorcón after suffering multiple cardiac arrests. He died on 4 May as a result of a final heart attack.
