= Mariano Barroso =

Spanish film director

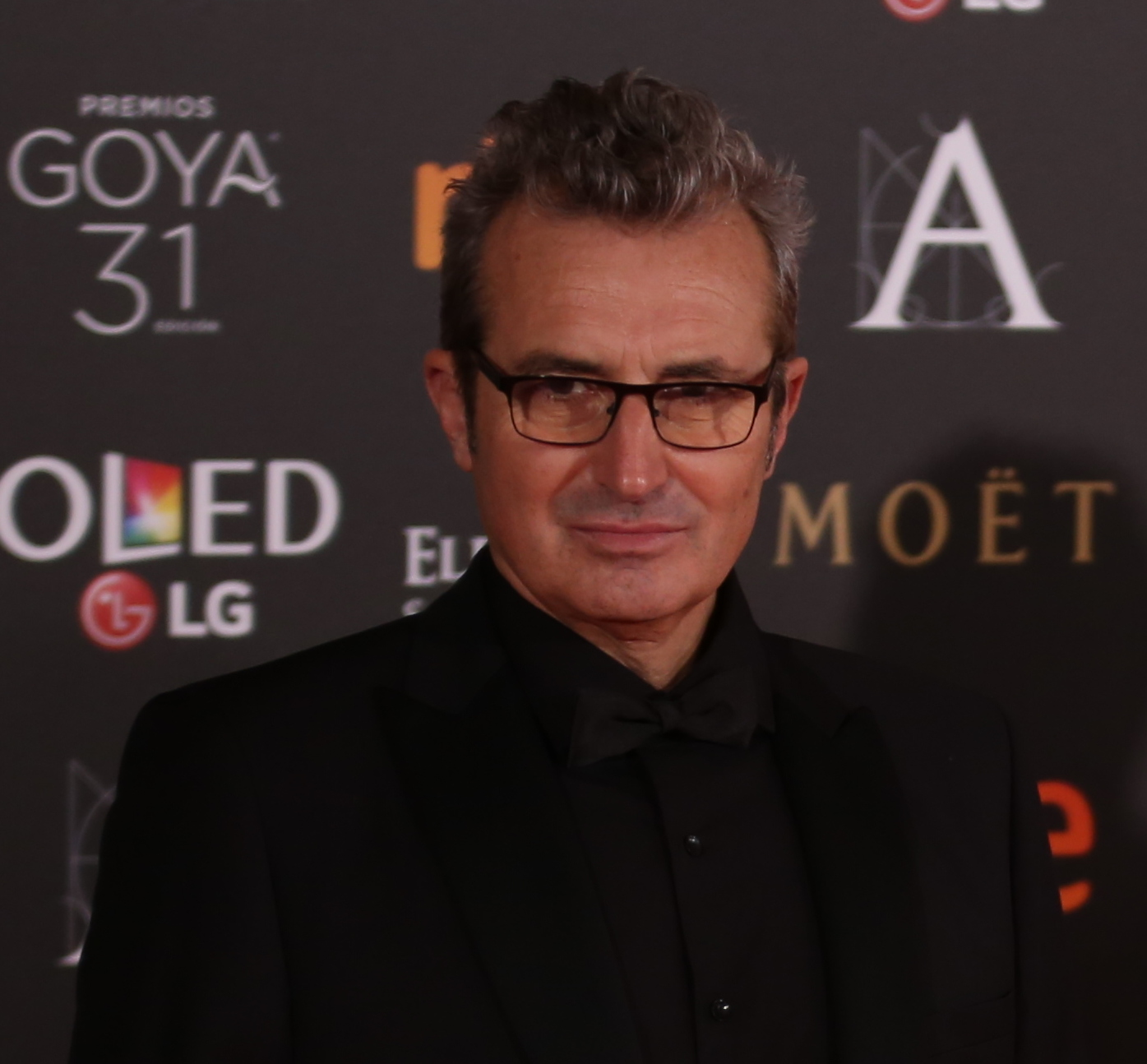
- Barroso in 2017
- Born: 26 December 1959 (age 66); Barcelona, Spain
- Occupations: Film director, screenwriter
- Years active: 1982 – present

Mariano Barroso (born 26 December 1959) is a Spanish film director and screenwriter. He has directed more than 20 films since 1982. His 1996 film Éxtasis was entered into the 46th Berlin International Film Festival.

Since 9 June 2018, he has been the President of the Spanish Academy of Cinematographic Arts and Sciences.

== Selected filmography ==
- 1993: Mi hermano del alma (My Soul Brother)
- 1996: Éxtasis (Extasis)
- 1999: Los lobos de Washington (Washington Wolves)
- 2001: In the Time of the Butterflies
- 2006: Hormigas en la boca (Ants in the Mouth)
- 2011: Lo mejor de Eva (Dark Impulse)
- 2013: Todas las mujeres (All the Women)
- 2026: El niño (The Child)
