= Fräulein Else (novella) =

1924 novella by Arthur Schnitzler

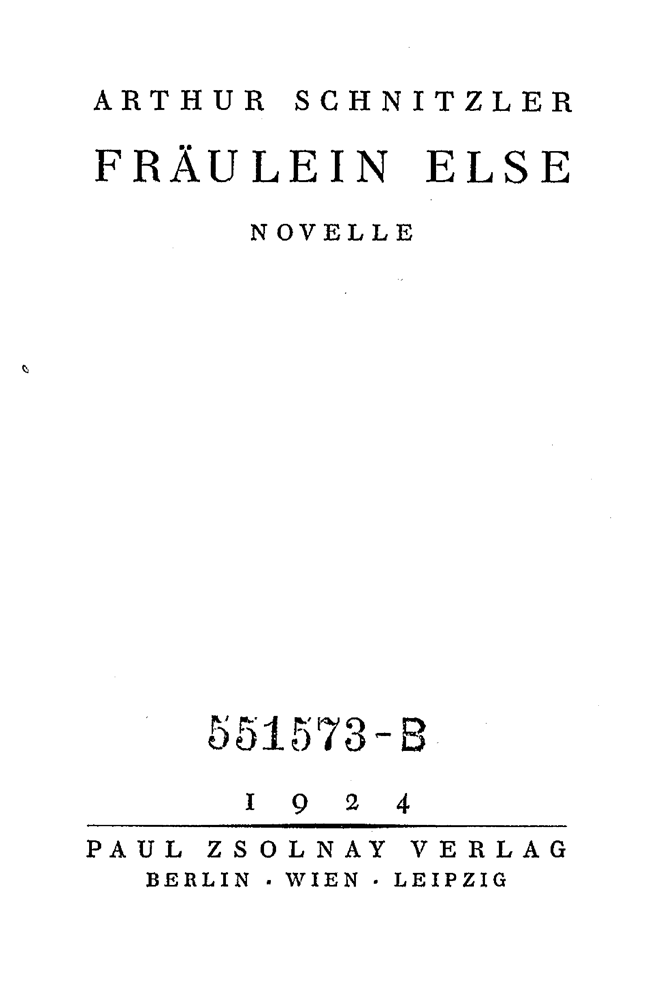
- Author: Arthur Schnitzler
- Language: German
- Publication date: 1924
- Publication place: Austria

Fräulein Else is a 1924 novella by the Austrian writer Arthur Schnitzler. It has been adapted into films on a number of occasions including the German silent Fräulein Else (1929), the Argentine The Naked Angel (1946) and Fräulein Else (2014).

== Adaptations ==
=== Operatic adaptation ===
Else, a 2021 Italian-language operatic adaptation by Federico Gardella, premiered at Cantiere Internazionale d'Arte di Montepulciano, Italy.

== Bibliography ==
- Kohl, Katrin Maria and Robertson, Ritchie. A History of Austrian Literature 1918–2000. Camden House, 2006.
