= 2005 in Spanish television =

This is a list of Spanish television related events in 2005.

== Events ==
- 14 June: Spanish Parliament passes Act 10/2005, regarding Digital terrestrial television and Cable television.
- 27 July: TV network Net TV (later known as Intereconomia TV) starts broadcasting.
- 5 September: IB3, Regional TV Channel of the Balearic Islands starts broadcasting.
- 7 November: Nationwide TV Channel Cuatro, starts broadcasting.
- 26 November: Antonio José Sánchez Mazuecos ranks 2nd in the Junior Eurovision Song Contest 2005, hold in Hasselt (Belgium).
- 28 November: Television channel Canal 300 starts broadcasting.
- 29 November: Television channel Nova starts broadcasting.
- 30 November:
  - Television channel Telecinco Estrellas (later known as FDF Telecinco and Factoría de Ficción) starts broadcasting.
  - Television channel Antena.Neox (later known as Neox 8 and Neox) starts broadcasting.
  - Television channel Fly Music starts broadcasting.
  - Television channel TVE 50 Anos starts broadcasting, replacing Canal Nostalgia.
  - Television channel Telecinco Sport starts broadcasting.
- 12 December: Television channel Clan starts broadcasting.
- 20 December: Regional Channel Televisión del Principado de Asturias starts broadcasting.

== Debuts ==
| Title | Channel | Debut | Performers/Host | Genre |
|---|---|---|---|---|
| 1 Equipo | Cuatro | 2005-11-09 | Pablo Carbonell | Documentary |
| 10 líneas de El Quijote | La 2 | 2005-03-03 | | Science/Culture |
| 6 Pack | Cuatro | 2005-11-12 | | Youth |
| 7 días al desnudo | Cuatro | 2005-12-22 | María Botto | Drama Series |
| A tortas con la vida | Antena 3 | 2005-08-30 | Armando del Río | Sitcom |
| Abuela de verano | TVE-1 | 2005-09-05 | Rosa María Sardá | Sitcom |
| Agitación + IVA | Telecinco | 2005-05-27 | Alfonso Vallejo | Comedy |
| Aída | Telecinco | 2005-01-16 | Carmen Machi | Sitcom |
| Al filo de la Ley | TVE-1 | 2005-03-31 | Natalia Verbeke | Drama Series |
| Amar en tiempos revueltos | TVE-1 | 2005-09-27 | Rodolfo Sancho | Soap Opera |
| Ankawa | TVE-1 | 2005-06-10 | Bertín Osborne | Quiz Show |
| Bricolocus | La 2 | 2005-11-23 | Juan Mateos | Science/Culture |
| Buenafuente | Antena 3 | 2005-01-11 | Andreu Buenafuente | Late Night |
| Callejeros | Cuatro | 2005-11-11 | | Docudrama |
| Camera Café | Telecinco | 2005-09-18 | Arturo Valls | Sitcom |
| Channel N° 4 | Cuatro | 2005-11-08 | Ana García Siñeriz | Variety Show |
| Chicas en la ciudad | Cuatro | 2005-11-12 | Ana María Fernández | Docudrama |
| Movies con Ñ | La 2 | 2005-07-15 | | Movies |
| Movies On | Telecinco | 2005-05-14 | | Movies |
| Con todos los acentos | La 2 | 2005-07-03 | Henry Molano | News |
| Corta T | Cuatro | 2005-11-13 | Adrián Lastra | Drama Series |
| Cuarto Milenio | Cuatro | 2005-11-13 | Iker Jiménez | Science/Culture |
| Cuatrosfera | Cuatro | 2005-11-08 | Manuela Velasco | Variety Show |
| De vez en cuando la vida | Antena 3 | 2005-10-09 | Silvia Jato | Reality Show |
| Diario de un skin | Telecinco | 2005-04-25 | Tristán Ulloa | Telefilm |
| El año que trafiqué con mujeres | Antena 3 | 2005-10-30 | Nancho Novo | Telefilm |
| El auténtico Rodrigo Leal | Antena 3 | 2005-08-29 | Iván Sánchez | Soap Opera |
| El enemigo en casa | TVE-1 | 2005-04-25 | Daniel Domenjó | Quiz Show |
| El especialista | Cuatro | 2005-11-10 | | Docudrama |
| El gato al agua | Intereconomía TV | 2005-11-21 | | Talk show |
| El Programa de Ana Rosa | Telecinco | 2005-01-10 | Ana Rosa Quintana | Variety Show |
| El programa del verano | Telecinco | 2005-08-08 | Óscar Martínez | Variety Show |
| El rondo | La 2 | 2005-08-28 | Lourdes García Campos | Sport |
| El sábado | TVE-1 | 2005-02-12 | Minerva Piquero | Variety Show |
| El Ti3mpo | Antena 3 | 2005-07-04 | Roberto Brasero | Public Service |
| España directo | TVE-1 | 2005-07-06 | Pilar García Muñiz | News |
| España es | La 2 | 2005-01-17 | Mon Santiso | Science/Culture |
| España innova | La 2 | 2005-01-31 | Sandra Sutherland | Science/Culture |
| Españoles en el mundo | TVE-1 | 2005-03-06 | Miguel Ángel Tobías | Travel Show |
| Estoy por ti | Antena 3 | 2005-07-11 | Anabel Alonso | Dating show |
| Eurovisión 2005: Elige nuestra canción | TVE-1 | 2005-03-04 | Carlos Lozano | Music |
| Flamenco, arte y fuente | La 2 | 2005-07-01 | José Luis Montoya | Music |
| Gente de Primera | TVE-1 | 2005-05-28 | Esther Arroyo | Talent show |
| Hazlo tú mismo | Cuatro | 2005-11-23 | Carles Porta | Docudrama |
| I love zapping | Telecinco | 2005-03-27 | | Videos |
| Informe Cuatro | Cuatro | 2005-11-24 | Jon Sistiaga | News Magazine |
| Ke no | Cuatro | 2005-11-12 | Joel Bosqued | Drama Series |
| La azotea de Wyoming | TVE-1 | 2005-01-12 | El Gran Wyoming | Late Night |
| La buena onda de la tarde | Antena 3 | 2005-03-29 | Alicia Senovilla | Variety Show |
| La hora de los corazones solitarios | Telecinco | 2005-05-28 | Óscar Martínez | Dating game |
| La suerte en tus manos | La 2 | 2005-10-27 | Sandra Daviú | Quiz Show |
| La tierra de las mil músicas | La 2 | 2005-03-11 | Joaquín Luqui | Music |
| La vida es rosa | Antena 3 | 2005-01-12 | Rosa Villacastín | Gossip Show |
| Las cerezas del cementerio | TVE-1 | 2005-01-01 | Concha Velasco | Miniseries |
| Lobos | Antena 3 | 2005-01-09 | Sancho Gracia | Drama Series |
| Los 4 de Cuatro | Cuatro | 2005-11-09 | Javier Coronas | Talent Show |
| Los hombres de Paco | Antena 3 | 2005-10-09 | Paco Tous | Drama Series |
| Made in China | TVE-1 | 2005-10-28 | Óscar Terol | Comedy |
| Madrileños por el mundo | Telemadrid | 2005-04-01 | Paloma Ferre | Travel Show |
| Maneras de sobrevivir | Telecinco | 2005-07-17 | Roberto Álamo | Drama Series |
| Maracaná 05 | Cuatro | 2005-11-14 | Michael Robinson | Sport |
| ¡Mira quién baila! | TVE-1 | 2005-06-13 | Anne Igartiburu | Talent show |
| Mire usté | Antena 3 | 2005-10-09 | Toni Soler | Comedy |
| Motivos personales | Telecinco | 2005-01-31 | Lydia Bosch | Drama Series |
| Noche Cuatro | Cuatro | 2005-11-11 | Raquel Sánchez-Silva | Quiz Show |
| Noche Hache | Cuatro | 2005-11-08 | Eva Hache | Late Night |
| Noticias Cuatro | Cuatro | 2005-11-07 | Iñaki Gabilondo | News |
| Números locos | Antena 3 | 2005-01-24 | Carlos Sobera | Quiz Show |
| Obsesión | TVE-1 | 2005-01-03 | Miguel de Miguel | Soap Opera |
| Paisajes del castellano | La 2 | 2005-07-25 | | Science/Culture |
| Palabra por palabra | La 2 | 2005-02-15 | Francine Gálvez | Science/Culture |
| Para que veas' | TVE-1 | 2005-03-20 | | Videos |
| El pasado es mañana | Telecinco | 2005-08-28 | Remedios Cervantes | Soap Opera |
| Paso a paso con Nacho Duato | La 2 | 2005-07-09 | Nacho Duato | Science/Culture |
| Periodismo de investigación | La 2 | 2005-06-25 | | Investigation |
| Plan C | Telecinco | 2005-11-07 | Carolina Ferre | Late Night |
| Pocoyo | La 2 | 2005-01-07 | Stephen Fry | Animated Series |
| Préstame tu vida | TVE-1 | 2005-01-07 | Ana García Lozano | Reality Show |
| Revista a su salud | La 2 | 2005-03-01 | Claudio Mariscal | Science/Culture |
| Rompecorazones | Cuatro | 2005-11-08 | Deborah Ombres | Quiz Show |
| Ruffus & Navarro Unplugged | TVE-1 | 2005-11-29 | Pepe Navarro | Late Night |
| Sábado cine | TVE-1 | 2005-01-15 | | Movies |
| Soy el que más sabe de televisión del mundo | Cuatro | 2005-11-12 | Nico Abad | Quiz Show |
| Splunge | TVE-1 | 2005-01-10 | Florentino Fernández | Comedy |
| Suárez y Mariscal, caso cerrado | Cuatro | 2005-11-08 | Susana Suárez | Drama Series |
| Tan a gustito | TVE-1 | 2005-10-23 | Alfonso Arús | Variety Show |
| Teleadictos | Telecinco | 2005-07-25 | | Videos |
| Todonieve.tv | Telecinco | 2005-01-27 | | Public Service |
| Todos contra el chef | Cuatro | 2005-11-12 | Darío Barrio | Cooking Show |
| Un programa estelar | La 2 | 2005-01-04 | | Documentary |
| Vamos a cocinar | TVE-1 | 2005-04-30 | José Andrés | Cooking Show |
| Vidas contadas | Cuatro | 2005-11-23 | | Docudrama |
| Vive la vía | La 2 | 2005-10-02 | | Documentary |
| Zap 20 | Telecinco | 2005-10-15 | | Videos |

== Television shows ==
- La 1
  - Telediario (1957– )
  - Informe Semanal (1973– )
  - Parlamento (1978–2014)
  - Telepasión española (1990– )
  - Corazón, Corazón (1993–2010)
  - Cartelera (1994–2009)
  - Los Desayunos de TVE (1994–2020)
  - Cine de barrio (1995– )
  - Gente (1995–2011)
  - Corazón (1997– )
  - Saber vivir (1997–2009)
  - El Conciertazo (2000–2009)
  - Cuéntame cómo pasó (2001– )
  - Por la mañana (2002–2008)
  - Juan y José show (2004–2006)
  - Música uno (2004–2006)
  - 59 segundos (2004–2012)
  - Destino Eurovisión (2004–2013)
- Antena 3
  - Antena 3 Noticias (1990– )
  - Club Megatrix (1995–2013)
  - Espejo público (1996– )
  - Ahora (2000–2006)
  - Pasapalabra (2000–2006)
  - El Diario de Patricia (2001–2008)
  - Aquí no hay quien viva (2003–2006)
  - Homo Zapping (2003–2007)
  - 7 días, 7 noches (2003–2007)
  - ¿Dónde estás, corazón? (2003–2011)
  - Los Más (2004–2006)
  - Mis adorables vecinos (2004–2006)
  - Pelopicopata (2004–2006)
  - Ruedo ibérico (2004–2006)
  - La Hora de la verdad (2004–2007)
- La 2
  - Al filo de lo imposble (1982– )
  - Pueblo de Dios (1982– )
  - Últimas preguntas (1983– )
  - En portada (1984– )
  - Estadio 2 (1984–2007)
  - Metrópolis (1985– )
  - Documentos TV (1986– )
  - Tendido cero (1986– )
  - Días de cine (1991– )
  - Línea 900 (1991–2007)
  - La Aventura del saber (1992– )
  - Jara y sedal (1992– )
  - Zona ACB (1993–2010)
  - La 2 noticias (1994–2020)
  - La noche temática, (1995– )
  - Redes (1996–2013)
  - Agrosfera (1997– )
  - El escarabajo verde (1997– )
  - Saber y ganar (1997– )
  - La Botica de la abuela (1997–2006)
  - En otras palabras (1997–2008)
  - La Mandrágora (1997–2009)
  - El Cine de La 2 (1998– )
  - Versión española (1998– )
  - Aquí hay trabajo (2000– )
  - España en comunidad (2000–2020)
  - Shalom (2003– )
  - Los Lunnis (2003–2010)
  - Padres en apuros (2003–2010)
  - Islam hoy (2003–2016)
  - Crónicas (2004–2006)
  - Miradas 2 (2004–2006)
  - De cerca (2004–2007)
  - Enfoque (2004–2007)
  - Estravagario (2004–2007)
  - Pocoyo (2005– )
- Telecinco
  - Informativos Telecinco (1990– )
  - Caiga quien caiga (1996–2008)
  - La Mirada crítica (1998–2009)
  - 7 vidas (1999–2006)
  - El comisario (1999–2009)
  - Nosolomúsica (1999–2012)
  - Survivor Spain (2000– )
  - Hospital Central (2000–2012)
  - Big Brother Spain (2000–2017)
  - Salsa rosa (2002–2006)
  - A tu lado (2002–2007)
  - Estrenos de cartelera (2002–2007)
  - Aquí hay tomate (2003–2008)
  - Los Serrano (2003–2008)
  - Bricomanía (2005–2010)
  - Decogarden (2005–2010)
  - Operación Triunfo (2005–2011)
  - La casa de tu vida (2004–2007)
  - TNT (2004–2007)
  - ¡Allá tú! (2004–2008)
  - Birlokus klub (2004–2008)
  - Karlos Arguiñano en tu cocina (2004–2010)
  - Diario de (2004–2011)
  - Gran Hermano VIP (2004–2019)

== Ending this year ==
- La 1
  - El Grand Prix del verano (1995–2005)
  - Ana y los siete (2002–2005)
  - Las cerezas (2004–2005)
  - Dos rombos (2004–2005)
  - Esto es vida (2004–2005)
- La 2
  - ¡Qué grande es el cine! (1995–2005)
  - Escuela del deporte (1999–2005)
- Antena 3
  - En buenas manos (1994–2005)
  - Noche de impacto (1998–2005)
  - El club de la comedia (1999–2005)
  - Un paso adelante (2002–2005)
  - La Isla de los FamoS.O.S. (2003–2005)
  - Cada día (2004–2005)
  - Casi perfectos (2004–2005)
  - El Equipo G (2004–2005)
  - La Granja (2004–2005)
- Telecinco
  - Crónicas marcianas (1997–2005)
  - Art Attack (2001–2005)
  - La Noche con Fuentes y Cía (2001–2005)
  - Pecado original (2002–2005)
  - Visto y no visto (2002–2005)
  - Kombai & Co. (2004–2005)
  - Latrelevisión (2004–2005)
- Canal +
  - El día después (1990–2005)
  - Redacción (1990–2005)
  - Lo + plus (1995–2005)
  - Las noticias del guiñol (1995–2005)
  - Magacine (1996–2005)

== Changes of network affiliation ==
| Show | Moved From | Moved To |
|---|---|---|
| Bricomanía (1994–2020) | La 2 | Telecinco |
| ¿Quién quiere ser millonario? (1999– ) | Telecinco | Antena 3 |
| Decogarden (2001–2020) | La 2 | Telecinco |
| Operación Triunfo (2001– ) | La 1 | Telecinco |

== Foreign series debuts in Spain ==
| English title | Spanish title | Original title | Channel | Country | Performers |
|---|---|---|---|---|---|
| The 4400 | Los 4400 | | Antena 3 | USA | Joel Gretsch |
| Alarm for Cobra 11 | Alerta cobra | Alarm für Cobra 11 | Cuatro | GER | Johannes Brandrup |
| Alias | Alias | | Cuatro | USA | Jennifer Garner |
| The Bernie Mac Show | El Show de Bernie Mac | | Antena 3 | USA | Bernie Mac |
| Blind Justice | Justicia ciega | | Telecinco | USA | Ron Eldard |
| Crayon Shin-chan | Shin-chan | Kureyon Shin-chan | Antena 3 | JAP | |
| Crossing Jordan | Crossing Jordan | | Cuatro | USA | Jill Hennessy |
| CSI: NY | CSI Nueva York | | Telecinco | USA | Gary Sinise |
| Desperate Housewives | Mujeres desesperadas | | La 1 | USA | T.Hatcher, F. Huffman, M. Cross, E. Longoria |
| --- | El Cuerpo del Deseo | El cuerpo del deseo | Antena 3 | USA | Andrés García |
| Grey's Anatomy | Anatomía de Grey | | Cuatro | USA | Ellen Pompeo |
| Hidden Passion | Pasión de Gavilanes | Pasión de gavilanes | Antena 3 | USA | Danna García, Mario Cimarro, Michel Brown |
| The Kids from Room 402 | Clase 402 | | Antena 3 | USA CAN | |
| --- | La mujer en el espejo | | Antena 3 | COL | Paola Rey |
| Las Vegas | Las Vegas | | Cuatro | USA | James Caan |
| Lost | Perdidos | | La 1 | USA | M. Fox, J. Holloway, E. Lilly |
| Medical Investigation | Medical Investigation | | Telecinco | USA | Neal McDonough |
| Medium | Medium | | Cuatro | USA | Patricia Arquette |
| Russian Dolls: Sex Trade | Matrioshki | Matroesjka's | Cuatro | BEL | Peter Van Den Begin |
| Scrubs | Scrubs | | Canal+ | USA | Zach Braff |
| South Park | South Park | | Cuatro | USA | --- |
| Summerland | Summerland | | Telecinco | USA | Lori Loughlin |

== Deaths ==
- 16 January – Agustín González, actor, 74.
- 27 March – Fernando Jiménez del Oso, host, 63.
- 28 March – Joaquín Luqui, journalist and music critic, 57.
- 21 April – Valeriano Andrés, actor, 82.
- 6 June – Manuel Codeso], actor, 79.
- 13 June – Sebastián Junyent, director, 57.
- 3 August – Luis Barbero, actor, 88.
- 9 September – Rafael Escamilla, host, 66.
- 9 December – Enrique Rubio, host, 85.

== See also ==
- 2005 in Spain
- List of Spanish films of 2005
