= Heart Attack Grill =

American restaurant in Downtown Las Vegas, Nevada

Coordinates: 33.305183°N 111.947991°W

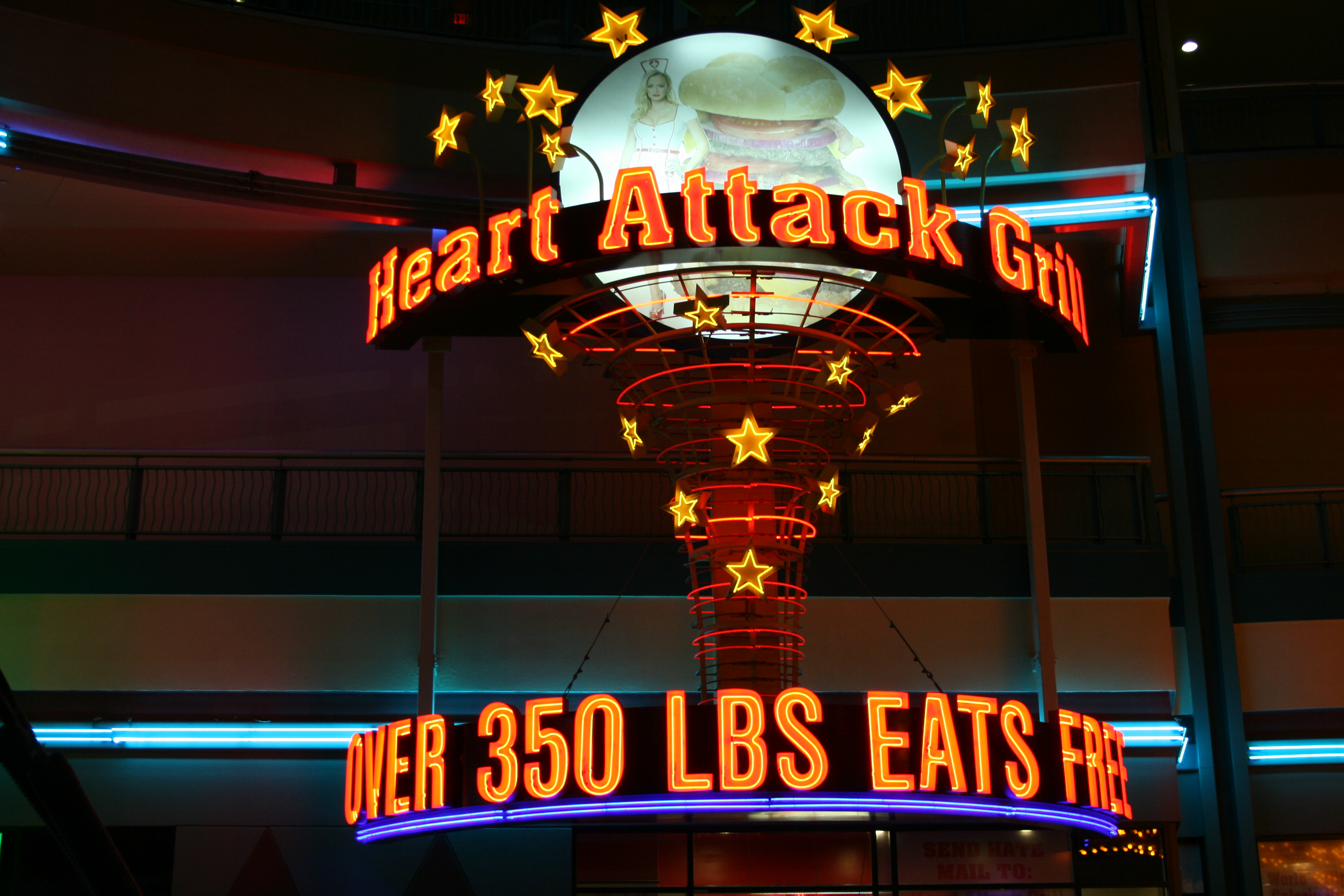
- Type: Limited liability company
- Industry: Full-service cafe
- Founded: 2005; 21 years ago in Tempe, Arizona
- Founder: Jon Basso
- Defunct: 2026
- Headquarters: Las Vegas, Nevada, U.S.
- Number of locations: 1 (closed)
- Area served: Las Vegas, Nevada
- Owner: Jon Basso
- Website: www.heartattackgrill.com

The Heart Attack Grill was an American independent restaurant in Downtown Las Vegas, Nevada. It had restaurants in Arizona (2005-2011) and Texas (2011), but its longest-running location was in Las Vegas, Nevada where it operated from October 2011 to May 2026. The restaurant served junk food deliberately high in fat, sugar, and cholesterol, and its staff wore hospital-themed uniforms.

== Theme ==
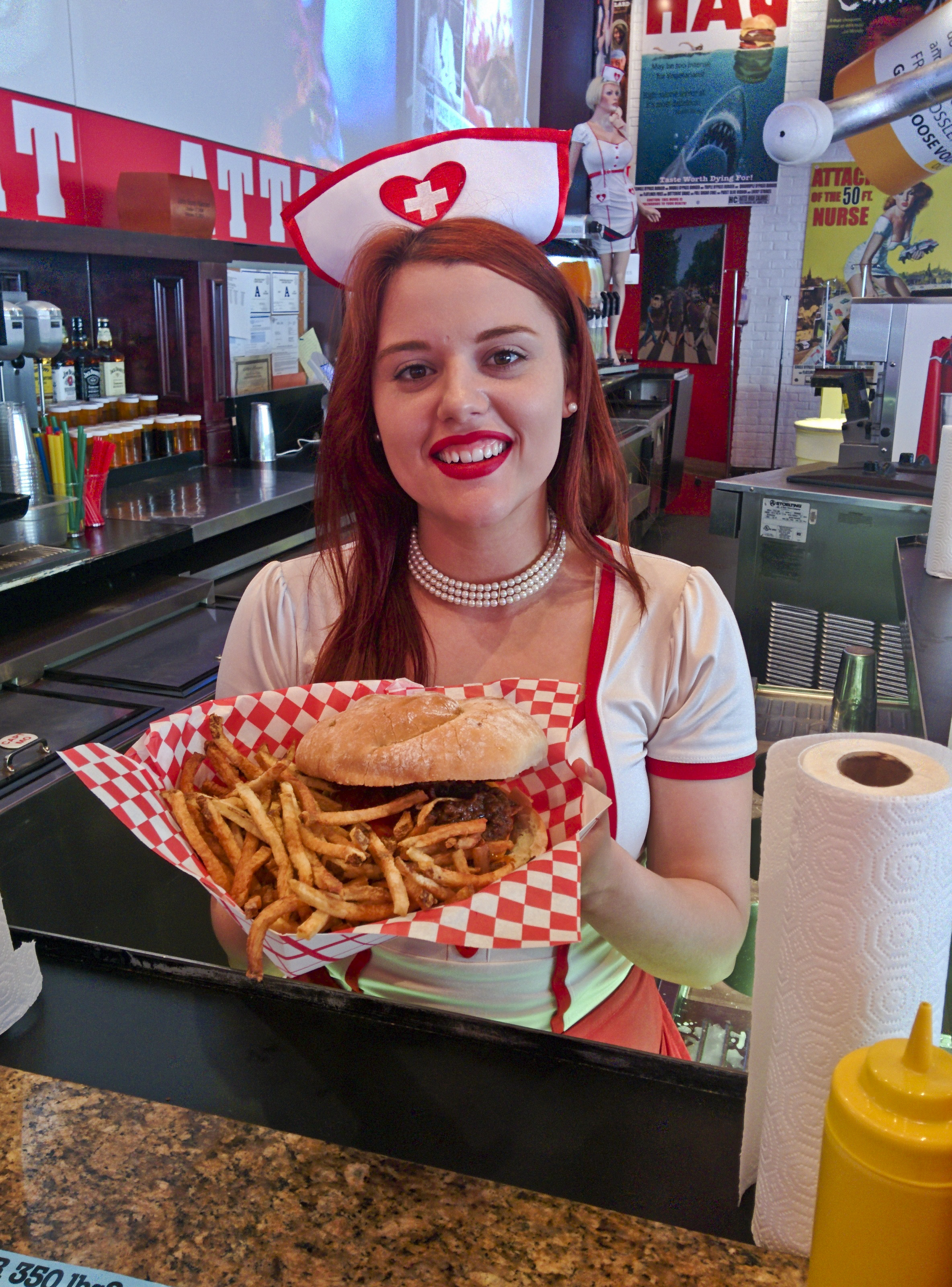
Heart Attack Grill waitress

The establishment was a hospital-theme restaurant where all waitresses wear "nurse" outfits. Each patient donned a hospital gown and wristband before ordering, and those who did not finish their food would receive a paddle-spanking by one of the "nurses" with the option to buy the paddle afterwards.

The menu was generally themed around items that were exceptionally high in calories and fat. It included a variety of burgers from Single to "Octuple Bypass" hamburgers, ranging from 8 to 64 ounces (230 to 1,810 g) of beef with the "Octuple Bypass" burger containing approximately 19,900 kilocalories or 83,260 kilojoules; all-you-can-eat "Flatliner Fries", cooked in pure lard, beer and tequila; "butterfat milkshakes"; and soft drinks such as Mexican Coca-Cola. Customers could also order unfiltered cigarettes, or candy cigarettes for children.

Customers over 350 lb (159 kg) in weight could eat at the restaurant for free (not including beverages). One of the restaurant's promotions was a reward for customers who finished a Triple or Quadruple Bypass Burger, after which they were placed in a wheelchair and wheeled out to their vehicle by their "personal nurse".

== History ==
The Heart Attack Grill was founded in 2005 in Tempe, Arizona, by Jon Basso, with the declared intent of serving "nutritional pornography", food "so bad for you it's shocking". The idea came when writing a marketing thesis about fitness training studios, as he became inspired by stories about his clients cheating on their diets.

The Arizona location closed on May 31, 2011, with a Heart Attack Grill opening in Dallas, Texas, earlier that month. The Dallas restaurant closed in October 2011 due to non-payment of rent.

The Las Vegas location opened in October 2011, and is legally owned by Jon Basso's LLC, ironically named Diet Center LLC. The restaurant's slogan is "Fighting anorexia since 2005".

On February 18, 2012, the Physicians Committee for Responsible Medicine requested the owner of Heart Attack Grill declare "moral bankruptcy" and close the Las Vegas restaurant. However, the owner did not close and instead defended his restaurant.

In 2019, founder Basso and the restaurant were accused of sexual harassment by a server. The matter was settled out of court in 2020.

On May 18, 2026, the restaurant announced that it would be closing after letting its long-term lease expire. The decision stemmed from casinos "pricing the average person out of the quintessential American experience of affordable indulgence" and "corporate greed replacing the soul of Las Vegas", but they are seeking new opportunities.

== Illnesses and deaths ==
The restaurant's spokesman, 575-pound (261 kg) Blair River, died on March 1, 2011, aged 29, from complications of pneumonia. The Arizona location closed shortly thereafter, on May 31, 2011.

On February 11, 2012, a customer suffered what was reported to be an apparent heart attack while eating a "Triple Bypass Burger" at the restaurant. Restaurant owner Jon Basso called for emergency services and the customer was taken to the hospital. Reportedly patrons thought it was a publicity stunt and started taking photos. Basso later said,

"I actually felt horrible for the gentleman because the tourists were taking photos of him as if it were some type of stunt. Even with our own morbid sense of humor, we would never pull a stunt like that."

On April 21, 2012, a woman fell unconscious while eating a Double Bypass Burger, drinking alcohol and smoking.

In February 2013, an unofficial spokesman and daily patron, 54-year-old John Alleman, died of an apparent heart attack while waiting at a bus stop in front of the restaurant.

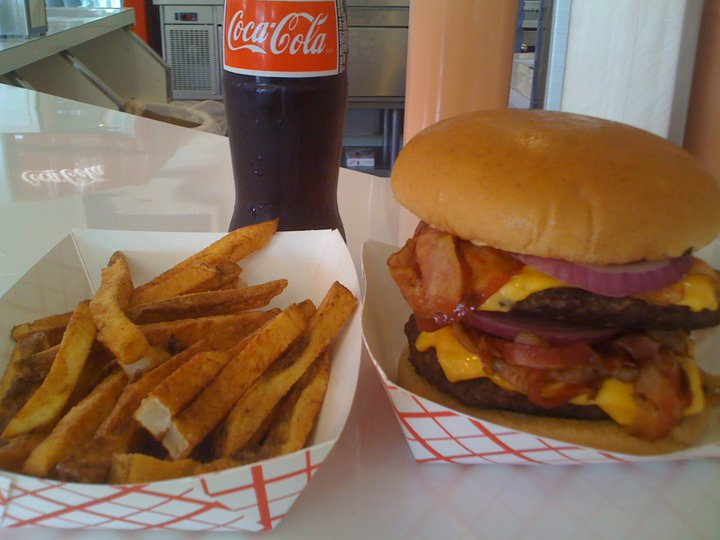
Double Bypass Burger & Flatliner Fries with a bottle of Mexican Coke

== Reception ==
Heart Attack Grill deliberately courted controversy as a marketing strategy. The restaurant was criticized and drawn complaints for its revealing uniforms and sexualized portrayal of nurses.

== Notable customers ==
Various competitive eaters and other celebrities visited the Heart Attack Grill, including Adamthewoo, Nikocado Avocado, Gabriel "Fluffy" Iglesias, BeardMeatsFood, Brian Shaw and former Nathan's Hotdog Eating Contest champions Takeru Kobayashi, Joey Chestnut, Matt Stonie and Miki Sudo.

== In television ==
The restaurant was featured on an episode of Extreme Pig-outs on the Travel Channel, All You Can Eat on The History Channel, World's Weirdest Restaurants on Food Network Canada, ABC News, on a CBS report with Bill Geist, on Khawatir 10 on MBC, on 7 Deadly Sins on Showtime, on the pilot episode on Fluffy Breaks Even, and The Kyle Files.

In France, it appeared in an episode devoted to Las Vegas of the television program Drôles de villes pour une rencontre.

In Spain, it appeared in the 33rd episode of the seventh season of the television program Madrileños por el mundo, dedicated to Las Vegas. It was also in the tenth episode of the second season of the television program Viajeros Cuatro, also dedicated to Las Vegas.

In the 2011-12 American broadcast television season, ABC put into development a sitcom set at a Heart Attack Grill, with Courteney Cox and David Arquette attached as executive producers. It did not move forward to pilot or series.

== See also ==
- Gross-out
- Junk food
- List of restaurants in Dallas
- List of restaurants in the Las Vegas Valley
- List of hamburger restaurants
- Obesity in the United States
- Breastaurant
- Food challenge
