= List of Good Behavior episodes =

Good Behavior is an American drama television series based on the novella series by Blake Crouch. The series stars Michelle Dockery as Letty Raines, a con artist who becomes involved with a hitman named Javier Pereira, played by Juan Diego Botto. Good Behavior debuted on TNT on November 15, 2016.

On January 14, 2017, the series was renewed for a second season, which premiered on October 15, 2017. As of December 17, 2017, 20 episodes of Good Behavior have aired, concluding the second season. On November 6, 2018, TNT canceled the series after two seasons.

== Series overview ==
Season	Episodes	Originally released	
Season	Episodes	First released	Last released
1	10	November 15, 2016	January 10, 2017
2	10	October 15, 2017	December 17, 2017

== Episodes ==
=== Season 1 (2016–17) ===
No. overall	No. in season	Title	Directed by	Written by	Original release date	U.S. viewers (millions)
1	1	"So You're Not an English Teacher"	Charlotte Sieling	Chad Hodge & Blake Crouch	November 13, 2016 (preview); November 15, 2016 (premiere)	0.57 (preview); 0.81 (premiere)
Released from prison on good behavior, thief and con-artist Letty Raines overhears a hitman planning a hit and attempts to thwart his plan.
2	2	"Only the Best for Mrs. Diaz"	Carl Franklin	Chad Hodge	November 15, 2016	0.75
Javier forces Letty to accompany him on his next hit, playing the role of his wife at an exclusive hotel.
3	3	"From Terrible Me"	Magnus Martens	Chad Hodge	November 22, 2016	0.64
Letty and Javier deal with the occurrences of the last episode, blaming each other for the way the hit played out and attempting to cover their tracks.
4	4	"Your Mama Had a Hard Night"	Mark Piznarski	Blake Crouch	November 22, 2016 (preview); November 29, 2016 (premiere)	0.50 (preview); 0.52 (premiere)
Letty returns to her hometown in an attempt to spend time with her son Jacob, despite the restraining order against her.
5	5	"Beautiful Things Deserve Beautiful Things"	Mikkel Nørgaard	Chad Hodge	December 6, 2016	0.71
Letty reunites with Javier on the road. Later, while Javier visits his sister, Letty is surprised by a visit from her parole officer Christian.
6	6	"We Pretend We're Stuck"	Jonas Pate	Chitra Elizabeth Sampath	December 13, 2016	0.68
Letty and Javier return to Letty's hometown and spend a problem-filled day with Jacob.
7	7	"The Ballad of Little Santino"	Phil Abraham	Brett Johnson	December 20, 2016	0.92
Letty and Javier have dinner with his family. Letty learns a shocking and tragic secret from Javier's youth.
8	8	"It Still Fits Bitch"	Mark Piznarski	Dana Baratta	December 27, 2016	0.91
Letty bails her mother out of jail - on the day her mother was supposed to be getting married. Letty is shocked when Jacob's father Sean returns.
9	9	"For You I'd Go with Strawberry"	Mikkel Nørgaard	Lenore Zion	January 3, 2017	0.83
Letty deals with the possibility of Sean getting custody of Jacob, the stress of which causes problems between her and Javier.
10	10	"All the Things"	Magnus Martens	Blake Crouch & Sarah Berry	January 10, 2017	0.90
Letty has to make a difficult choice - one which puts Javier at risk of prison, unless she can get to him before it's too late.

=== Season 2 (2017) ===
No. overall	No. in season	Title	Directed by	Written by	Original release date	U.S. viewers (millions)
11	1	"The Heart Attack is the Best Way"	Mikkel Nørgaard	Chad Hodge	October 15, 2017	0.69
Letty and Javier try to live as a normal family with Jacob, albeit with aliases in a new town, but find themselves turning to old habits. Christian warns Letty that Agent Lashever is still determined to find Javier, while Javier suspects that he is being targeted by someone from his past.
12	2	"I Want You to Leave a Person Alive for Once"	Magnus Martens	Chitra Elizabeth Sampath	October 22, 2017	0.56
To get money for Jacob's tuition, Javier takes another hit job under the guise of camping, but is hindered by Letty trying to stop him and the appearance of Jacob, his new friend Apple, and Apple's mother Carin. Meanwhile, Javier's sister Ava is approached by her ex-boyfriend Teo, but Ava's daughters are suspicious of their mother's old flame.
13	3	"Because I'm Mrs. Claus"	Clare Kilner	Chad Hodge	October 29, 2017	0.50
Rob invites Letty and Javier to join him and Estelle on a Christmas vacation at a luxury hotel, but after discovering expenses aren't covered, Letty offers to help him by stealing from wealthy hotel guests. Javier believes a suspicious guest is either stalking him or threatening Estelle.
14	4	"I Think It's a Sign"	Mikkel Nørgaard	Brett Johnson	November 5, 2017	0.53
Letty and Javier have been caught by Agent Lashever, but a bad storm and a series of bizarre circumstances delays their transport to prison, buying them time to find way out.
15	5	"You Could Discover Me"	Jessica Lowrey	Chitra Elizabeth Sampath	November 12, 2017	0.62
Letty and Javier are forced to steal half a million dollars from the owner of a drag club as part of a deal for Agent Lashever to let them get away. Javier is wary of Ava allowing Teo back into her life and suspects Teo is after something more sinister.
16	6	"It's No Fun If It's Easy"	Coky Giedroyc	Dana Baratta	November 19, 2017	0.54
Short $50 000 in order to pay off Agent Lashever, Letty, Javier, and Jacob go to meet Letty's grandmother Alice, a veteran con artist who agrees to give Letty the money only if Letty can manipulate Alice's current husband into a situation where Alice can divorce him. Javier confronts Teo when Javier's nieces run away from home out of concern for how Teo has intruded into their lives.
17	7	"Don't Thank God, Thank Me"	Louise Friedberg	Aaron Fullerton	November 26, 2017	0.57
When Letty realizes how she and Javier seem to hurt people around them when they're together, she gives Jacob back to Estelle, leaves Javier, and tries to return to her previous life, only to find she might be worse off than before. Javier abducts Teo and tries to get answers for why he's trying to kill him and forces Teo to admit to Ava who he really is.
18	8	"Stay Beautiful"	Mikkel Nørgaard	Lenore Zion	December 3, 2017	0.54
Letty continues to spiral downward as she relapses into her worst habits. Javier tries to make things right for Letty, but the cost is one of the strangest and gruesome jobs he's ever done.
19	9	"And I Am a Violent Criminal"	Doc Crotzer	Lenore Zion & Sarah Berry	December 10, 2017	0.68
Letty and Javier are reunited and reconcile. But when Javier leaves to find and kill Teo, Letty finds the danger has come to her instead.
20	10	"Letty Raines, in the Mansion, with the Gun"	Magnus Martens	Story by : Chad Hodge; Teleplay by : Aaron Fullerton & Joshua Karns	December 17, 2017	0.72
Javier and Letty find themselves racing to clean up the mess she made after killing Teo if they want to avoid prison, but find themselves encountering setbacks as Letty is overwhelmed with guilt over what she's done.

== Ratings ==
=== Season 1 (2016–17) ===
Viewership and ratings per episode of List of Good Behavior episodes
No.	Title	Air date	Rating (18–49)	Viewers (millions)	DVR (18–49)	DVR viewers (millions)	Total (18–49)	Total viewers (millions)
1	"So You're Not an English Teacher"	November 15, 2016	0.2	0.81	—N/a	—N/a	—N/a	—N/a
2	"Only The Best For Mrs. Diaz"	November 15, 2016	0.2	0.75	—N/a	—N/a	—N/a	—N/a
3	"From Terrible Me"	November 22, 2016	0.2	0.64	—N/a	0.69	—N/a	1.33
4	"Your Mama Had a Hard Night"	November 29, 2016	0.2	0.52	0.1	0.40	0.3	0.92
5	"Beautiful Things Deserve Beautiful Things"	December 6, 2016	0.2	0.71	—N/a	0.88	—N/a	1.59
6	"We Pretend We're Stuck"	December 13, 2016	0.2	0.68	0.2	0.91	0.4	1.60
7	"The Ballad of Little Santino"	December 20, 2016	0.2	0.92	—N/a	—N/a	—N/a	—N/a
8	"It Still Fits Bitch"	December 27, 2016	0.2	0.91	—N/a	—N/a	—N/a	—N/a
9	"For You I'd Go With Strawberry"	January 3, 2017	0.2	0.83	0.2	0.83	0.4	1.66
10	"All the Things"	January 10, 2017	0.2	0.90	0.2	0.85	0.4	1.74

=== Season 2 (2017) ===
Viewership and ratings per episode of List of Good Behavior episodes
No.	Title	Air date	Rating (18–49)	Viewers (millions)	DVR (18–49)	DVR viewers (millions)	Total (18–49)	Total viewers (millions)
1	"The Heart Attack is the Best Way"	October 15, 2017	0.2	0.69	0.2	0.73	0.4	1.42
2	"I Want You to Leave a Person Alive for Once"	October 22, 2017	0.2	0.56	—N/a	0.68	—N/a	1.24
3	"Because I'm Mrs. Claus"	October 29, 2017	0.1	0.50	0.2	0.70	0.3	1.20
4	"I Think It's A Sign"	November 5, 2017	0.1	0.53	0.2	0.72	0.3	1.24
5	"You Could Discover Me"	November 12, 2017	0.2	0.62	—N/a	—N/a	—N/a	—N/a
6	"It's No Fun If It's Easy"	November 19, 2017	0.1	0.54	—N/a	—N/a	—N/a	—N/a
7	"Don't Thank God, Thank Me"	November 26, 2017	0.2	0.57	—N/a	0.73	—N/a	1.30
8	"Stay Beautiful"	December 3, 2017	0.1	0.54	0.2	0.69	0.3	1.23
9	"And I'm A Violent Criminal"	December 10, 2017	0.2	0.68	—N/a	0.70	—N/a	1.38
10	"Letty Raines, In The Mansion, With The Gun"	December 17, 2017	0.2	0.72	—N/a	—N/a	—N/a	—N/a
