= Berta's Motives =

- Film poster
- Spanish: Los motivos de Berta
- Directed by: José Luis Guerín
- Written by: José Luis Guerín
- Starring: Silvia Gracia; Arielle Dombasle; Iñaki Aierra; Rafael Díaz
- Cinematography: Gerardo Gormezano
- Edited by: José Luis Guerín
- Music by: Franz Schubert
- Release dates: September 1984 (Zinemaldia); 13 February 1985 (Spain)
- Country: Spain
- Language: Spanish

Berta's Motives (Spanish: Los motivos de Berta) is a 1984 Spanish black and white film written and directed by José Luis Guerín (in his feature film debut). It stars Silvia Gracia, Arielle Dombasle, Iñaki Aierra, and Rafael Díaz.

== Plot ==
Taking place in the fictional village of Sotoluego, the plot focus on the maturing of 13-year-old Berta. The monotonous life of the village is upended by the arrival of extravagant Demetrio and the settling of a film crew.

== Cast ==
- Silvia Gracia as Berta
- Arielle Dombasle as Mabel
- Iñaki Aierra as Demetrio
- Juan Diego Botto as Luisito
- Raúl Fraire as Don Belardo
- Rafael Díaz as Ismael
- Carmen Ávila as Águeda
- Cristina Bodelón
- María Botto

== Production ==
The film boasted a budget of around 10 million ₧. It was shot in Melque de Cercos, province of Segovia.

== Release ==
The film had a couple of press screenings on 9 March 1984 at Madrid's Cines Griffith. It was presented in the 'Cine Español' section of the 32nd San Sebastián International Film Festival in September 1984. It also made it to the programme of the 1984 Mostra de València and to the non-competitive slate of the 35th Berlin International Film Festival (February 1985). It had a commercial release in Barcelona on 13 February 1985. Distribution issues notwithstanding, the film earned "unanimous enthusiasm" from the critics.

== Accolades ==
Year	Award	Category	Nominee(s)	Result	Ref.
1986	30th Sant Jordi Awards	Best Spanish Film		Won	

== See also ==
- List of Spanish films of 1985
