= On the Fringe (film) =

- Theatrical release poster
- Spanish: En los márgenes
- Directed by: Juan Diego Botto
- Written by: Juan Diego Botto; Olga Rodríguez
- Produced by: Penélope Cruz; Álvaro Longoria
- Starring: Penélope Cruz; Luis Tosar; Adelfa Calvo; Christian Checa; Juan Diego Botto; Aixa Villagrán; Font García; Mª Isabel Díaz Lago; Sergio Villanueva; Nur Levi
- Cinematography: Arnau Valls Colomer
- Edited by: Mapa Pastor
- Music by: Eduardo Cruz
- Production companies: Morena Films; On The Fringe AIE; Panache Productions
- Distributed by: Vértice 360
- Release dates: 6 September 2022 (Venice); 7 October 2022 (Spain)
- Countries: Spain; Belgium
- Languages: Spanish; Arabic

On the Fringe (Spanish: En los márgenes) is a 2022 Spanish-Belgian thriller and social drama film directed by Juan Diego Botto from a screenplay by Botto and Olga Rodríguez. It stars Penélope Cruz, Luis Tosar, Adelfa Calvo, and Christian Checa.

== Plot ==
A homage to the Plataforma de Afectados por la Hipoteca, the plot revolves around the life of Rafa, a lawyer-activist set on helping people facing home eviction and who put his commitment to lost causes before his family, formed by wife Helena and stepson Raúl. Over the course of 24 dramatic hours, Rafa's story intertwines with those of Azucena (a retail cashier living with Manuel about to lose her home), and Teodora (an old woman who has lost her home in the wake of providing monetary guarantee to her son).

== Cast ==
- Penélope Cruz as Azucena
- Luis Tosar as Rafa
- Juan Diego Botto as Manuel
- Aixa Villagrán as Helena
- Adelfa Calvo as Teodora
- Nur Levi
- Christian Checa as Raúl
- Font García as Germán
- María Isabel Díaz Lago
- Sergio Villanueva
- Javier Perdiguero
- Fabrice Boutique
- Irene Bueno Royo

== Production ==
On the Fringe is Juan Diego Botto's debut as a feature film director. The screenplay was penned by Botto himself together with Olga Rodríguez. In addition to starring in the film Penélope Cruz also took over production duties alongside Morena Films's Álvaro Longoria. The film was produced by Morena Films alongside On The Fringe AIE and Panache Productions / La Compagnie Cinematographique with the participation of Amazon Prime Video and RTVE, funding from Eurimages, and support from Ayuntamiento de Madrid. Shooting locations included Madrid and Alcorcón. It features dialogue in Spanish and Arabic.

== Release ==
The film was selected for screening at the 79th Venice International Film Festival's Horizons section. It also screened at the 70th San Sebastián International Film Festival. Distributed by Vértice Cine, it was slated for a 30 September 2022 theatrical release in Spain, then rescheduled to 7 October 2022. It will later stream on Amazon Prime Video.

== Reception ==
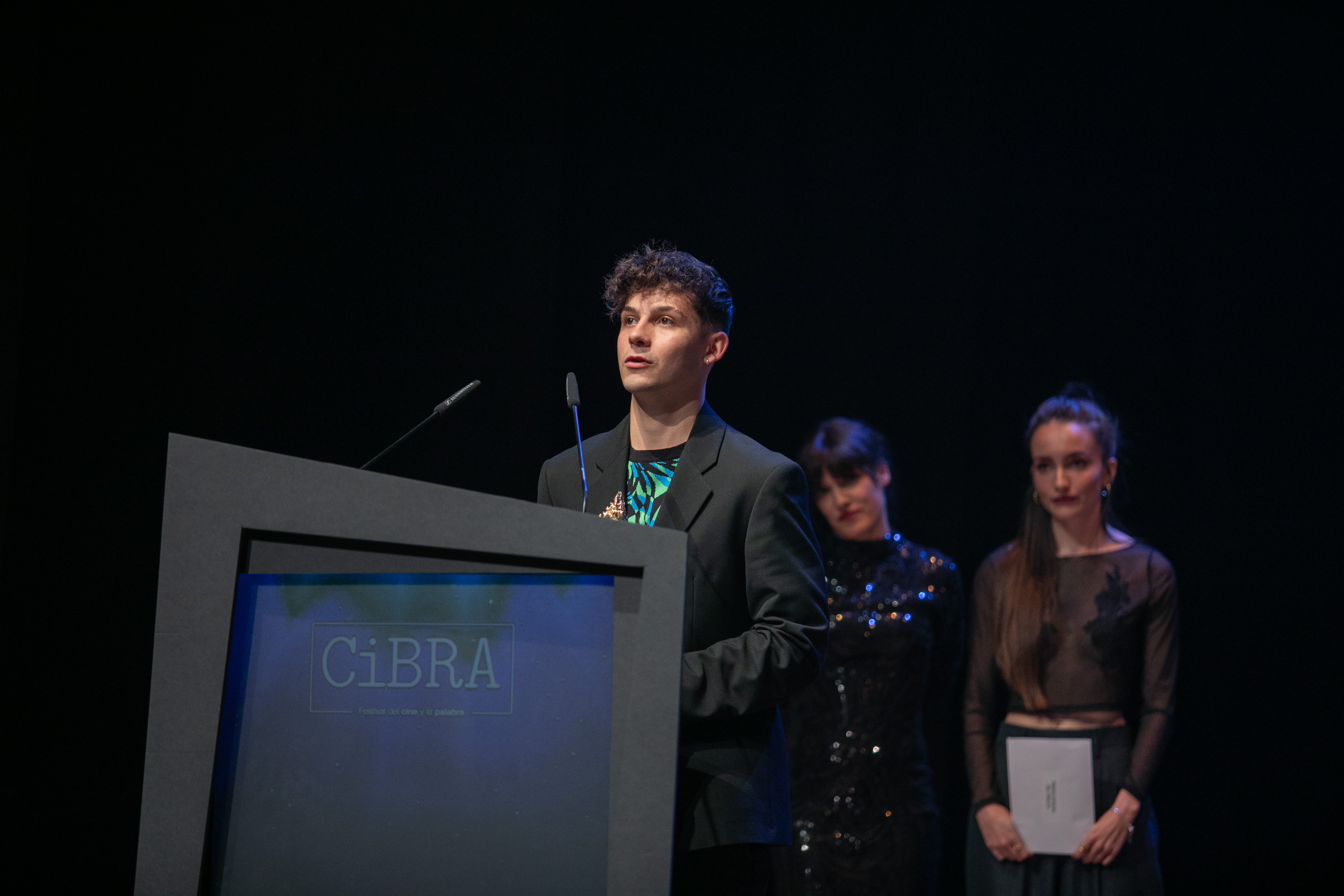
Actor Christian Checa collecting the Audience Award won by On the Fringe at Festival CiBRA (November 2022)

On the review aggregator website Rotten Tomatoes, 82% of 10 critics' reviews are positive, with an average rating of 6.70/10.

Wendy Ide of ScreenDaily deemed the film to be "pacey, propulsive stuff" in which the helmer "combines a social conscience with a thriller's sense of mounting pressure".

Mirito Torreiro of Fotogramas rated the film 4 out of 5 stars, highlighting the honesty of the proposal as the best thing about the film, otherwise praising the "impressive acting works" that Botto obtained from Tosar and Cruz, which result into something "dazzling and touching".

Raquel Hernández Luján of HobbyConsolas rated the "well-documented, painfully realistic and very humane film" with 70 points ("good") singling out Calvo's character and performance as the best thing about the film, while citing some "overly forced characterizations and unsubtle messages" as negative elements.

Toni Vall of Cinemanía rated Botto's "very interesting" debut film 3½ stars, declaring himself to feel most interested by the paradoxical theme of the depiction of that kind of people going out of their way to help strangers while at the same time being a disaster with those closest to them, rather than by the depiction of the wider horrible reality about house evictions.

== Accolades ==
Year	Award	Category	Nominee(s)	Result	Ref.
2022	28th Forqué Awards	Best Film Actor	Luis Tosar	Nominated	
2022	28th Forqué Awards	Cinema and Education in Values		Nominated	
2023	10th Feroz Awards	Best Actor in a Film	Luis Tosar	Nominated	
2023	10th Feroz Awards	Best Supporting Actress in a Film	Adelfa Calvo	Nominated	
2023	78th CEC Medals	Best New Director	Juan Diego Botto	Nominated	
2023	78th CEC Medals	Best New Actor	Christian Checa	Nominated	
2023	37th Goya Awards	Best New Director	Juan Diego Botto	Nominated	
2023	37th Goya Awards	Best Actor	Luis Tosar	Nominated	
2023	37th Goya Awards	Best Supporting Actress	Penélope Cruz	Nominated	
2023	37th Goya Awards	Best New Actor	Christian Checa	Nominated	
2023	37th Goya Awards	Best Original Song	"En los márgenes" by Eduardo Cruz and María Rozalén	Nominated	
2023	31st Actors and Actresses Union Awards	Best Film Actress in a Minor Role	Adelfa Calvo	Won	
2023	31st Actors and Actresses Union Awards	Best New Actor	Christian Checa	Nominated	

== See also ==
- List of Spanish films of 2022
