= With George Bush on My Mind =

- Theatrical release poster
- Spanish: Los abajo firmantes
- Directed by: Joaquín Oristrell
- Screenplay by: María Botto; Javier Cámara; Juan Diego Botto; Elvira Mínguez; Joaquín Oristrell
- Produced by: Joaquín Oristrell; Cristina Rota
- Starring: Javier Cámara; Juan Diego Botto; Elvira Mínguez; María Botto
- Cinematography: Mischa Lluch
- Edited by: Miguel Ángel Santamaría
- Music by: Nacho Mastretta
- Production companies: Centro de Nuevos Creadores; Garbo Producciones
- Release dates: September 2003 (San Sebastián); 17 October 2003 (Spain)
- Country: Spain
- Language: Spanish

With George Bush on My Mind (Spanish: Los abajo firmantes; transl. 'The Signers Below') is a 2003 Spanish comedy-drama film directed by Joaquín Oristrell, which stars Javier Cámara, Juan Diego Botto, Elvira Mínguez and María Botto.

== Plot ==
The plot follows a troupe of thespians preparing a stage play (García Lorca's Play Without a Title). The replacement lead actor is also set to read an anti-war manifesto at the end of the show.

== Cast ==
- Javier Cámara as Mario
- Juan Diego Botto as Jorge
- Elvira Mínguez as Carmen
- María Botto as Laura
- José Manuel Cervino as Padre de Laura
- Raúl García as Joven
- Jesús Díaz as Leñador
- Fernando Guillén as Tramoyista
- Rebeca Fernández as Hada

== Production ==
The screenplay was penned by the four leads alongside Oristrell. A Centro de Nuevos Creadores and Garbo Producciones production, the film featured a "very small" budget, and it was shot in 3 weeks and a half.

== Release ==
The film premiered at the 51st San Sebastián International Film Festival in September 2003. It was theatrically released in Spain on 17 October 2003.

== Reception ==
Esteve Riambau of Fotogramas rated the film 5 out of 5 stars, writing that the film came "from the guts" to show the actors' commitment to the campaign against the Iraq War, and that it also "becomes an excellent portrait of the world of comedians", praising its boldness as the best thing about it.

Casimiro Torreiro of El País considered, that rather than an erudite dissection of a stage play, the film tries to "reproduce the emotional pulse of a few days, those of the first months of 2003, lived frantically"; the chronicle about the commitment to protest against the war in Iraq, also praising the performances of the two Bottos, Mínguez and Cámara.

== See also ==
- List of Spanish films of 2003
