= Melque =

Melque may refer to:

- Melque de Cercos, municipality in Segovia, Spain
- Santa María de Melque, church in Toledo, Spain
- Melque (footballer) (born 1997), Melque Melito Alexandre Garcia, Mozambican footballer
