= Broken Silence (2001 film) =

2001 film by Montxo Armendáriz

- Theatrical release poster
- Spanish: Silencio roto
- Directed by: Montxo Armendáriz
- Screenplay by: Montxo Armendáriz
- Produced by: Puy Oria; Montxo Armendáriz
- Starring: Lucía Jiménez; Juan Diego Botto; Álvaro de Luna; María Botto; María Vázquez; Rubén Ochandiano; Pepo Oliva; Joseba Apaolaza; Jordi Bosch; Ramón Barea; Helio Pedregal; Asunción Balaguer; Alicia Sánchez; Andoni Erburu; Joan Dalmau
- Cinematography: Guillermo Navarro
- Edited by: Rori Sainz de Rozas
- Music by: Pascal Gaigne
- Production company: Oria Films
- Release date: 27 April 2001
- Running time: 110 min
- Country: Spain
- Language: Spanish

Broken Silence (Spanish: Silencio roto) is a 2001 Spanish drama film directed by Montxo Armendáriz which stars Lucía Jiménez and Juan Diego Botto. The plot depicts life and repression in a Spanish village in the years 1944–1948.

== Cast ==
- Lucía Jiménez as Lucía, young woman, daughter of a rebel who died.
- Juan Diego Botto as Manuel, son of Rosario and Matias, friend and boyfriend of Lucía.
- Mercedes Sampietro as Teresa, Lucia's aunt.
- Álvaro de Luna as Don Hilario, professor who had an affair with Teresa while Cosme was in the war.
- María Botto as Lola, Manuel's sister.
- Andoni Erburu as Juan.
- Rubén Ochandiano as Sebas, a shepherd and Lola's boyfriend.
- María Vázquez as Sole, wife of the chief of Franco's soldiers in the village.
- Ramón Barea as Antonio
- Joseba Apaolaza as Teniente (Lieutenant)
- Pepo Oliva as Cosme, Teresa's husband, Francoist, wounded in war.
- Jordi Bosch as Sargento.
- Alicia Sánchez as Rosario.
- Helio Pedregal as Matías.
- Mercedes Sampietro as Teresa.
- Asunción Balaguer as Juana
- Joan Dalmau

== Plot ==
Starting in Navarre in 1944, The plot begins with Lucía, a young woman, returning to her village after nine years. The year is 1944, and Francisco Franco has already won the war. Lucía explains that she has to come back - supposedly to earn money - because her mother has five other children. We get to know Teresa, Sebas, Manuel, and Hilario, who has just returned from jail. We can also see the soldiers' office, which has the phrase “Todo por la patria” (All for the Fatherland) painted above the door. After arriving, Lucía lives with Teresa and starts working at her bar.

From the first frame, you can see the oppression that the soldiers exert on the town. In one scene, the sergeant orders Sebas to drink a whole bottle of castor oil because he has said a curse word. Soon after, the Boss's wife (Sole) runs to tell Lucía and Teresa that the soldiers are coming for Manuel. Manuel runs to the mountains to join the maquis (the guerrilla fighters who live there), so instead of him, the soldiers punish Rosario, her mother. After that, Lucía brings Genaro some papers to the mountains to help the maquis, and her relationship with Manuel becomes romantic again.

The seasons change, and 1946 begins. The maquis invade the church during mass and capture several soldiers. Matías goes to "talk" to Cosme, but insults him for being a Francoist. Lola explains that when she returned from the war, Cosme found out that Hilario and Teresa had lived together, and that is why she betrayed Hilario and Matías.

The maquis won and took the town, and everyone celebrates, but soon after more soldiers are coming and the maquis flee to the mountains again. The soldiers make everyone stand in the plaza while Alfredo indicates who the collaborators are, including Lola, but not Lucía. Some days later, Alfredo is killed while he is driving to pick up Lucía. Lucía is supposed to have planned it.

As punishment, the soldiers come to take Rosario, but she has already killed herself. Very soon after, Lucía says that she is pregnant, and Manuel says that his father has been killed by the maquis because he did not agree with them. Among all the death, Lucía decides to return to her mother's house to bear her daughter.

The seasons change again, and the winter of 1948 begins. Lucía returns, and discovers that Sebas has died, Hilario is hiding in the attic of her house (that of Cosme and Teresa), and Teresa is leaving food for the maquis. Lucía decides to see Manuel, and shows him photos of her daughter. Lucía has false documents so Manuel can leave, but Manuel doesn't want to. Suddenly, a group of rebels arrives with a spy who is killed in broad daylight. Lucía, stunned, runs back to the village.

The soldiers discover that Hilario was hiding in the attic, and Cosme lets them arrest Teresa, Hilario, and Lucía. While they are in jail, other soldiers arrive with Manuel and another maqui. The lieutenant asks the prisoners to give them the names of other maquis in exchange for a sentence reduction. Hilario elbows the lieutenant and tries to escape, but the guard at the door shoots him and kills him. The lieutenant sees that Lucía and Manuel have a relationship, and so he orders the soldiers to kill Manuel and Teresa, while Lucía can hear the shots.

Upon returning, Lucía tells Lola that she thinks she betrayed them, but Lola responds ambiguously. At last, Lucía leaves by bus, under a rainbow in the mountains.

== Topics ==
Hope

Hope is the most important theme in the movie. All the characters in "Broken Silence" seek it. The guerrillas try to keep it, Genaro cannot have it without the letters from his son who is already dead, and Rosario and Lola finally lose it. The most powerful message of the film is that there is always hope, even if it sometimes seems otherwise. At the end of the film, Lucía recognizes the importance of this fact. She continues to write the letters to Genaro, instead of Hilario, her dead friend. As Hilario said, that is what allows Genero to continue to live, and that is the most important. As Lucía leaves the village of sadness, a rainbow is seen which reinforces the feeling that there is still hope.

Justice

What is justice? In "Broken Silence," the main characters sometimes doubt their perception of what is fair. Matías, Manuel's father, wanted to kill more people who betrayed the guerrillas. The guerrillas in power decide that it was not fair to kill many people from the town. Ironically, the guerrillas kill Matías for his inability to obey orders. Guerrillas kill guerrillas; townspeople kill other townspeople.

Trust

"No one can be trusted", Teresa tells Lucía in one of the first scenes of "Broken Silence." But at the beginning of the movie, Lucía can trust Lola, Manuel, Teresa, and Hilario. At the end of the film, Manuel, Teresa, and Hilario are dead, and Lucia cannot trust Lola, her best friend, who has betrayed her own family. Although she seemed quite harsh when she said it, Teresa's advice was correct.

Family

In "Broken Silence," the relationships that the characters have with their families support them, but they also collapse under the pressure of war. Most of the main characters are related, but the strength of the connections varies. Lucía has a close relationship with her aunt Teresa, her lover Manuel, and her daughter. Her relationships with her mother and uncle Cosme are weaker, and Cosme betrays her family at the end. Although family ties can be of great importance, as in the case of Genaro and his son, they can also have little value. Lola's family was happy, but the war destroys everything they had. At the end of the film, her brother Manuel, her parents Rosario and Matías, and her lover Sebas are dead. Lola loses the loyalty she cared about and betrays Lucía, her best friend.

== Point of view ==
The film tells how the Francoist repression was in small villages. The focus is on the bad and sad effects of the Franco regime and the impact it has on the lives of everyone in town. Good characters are those who help the guerrilla resistance (the Spanish Maquis) and do not betray their friends by giving their names to the soldiers. Those who support Franco - for example, the Sergeant, or Cosme - are shown without emotion or compassion for other humans.

But the movie is not totally well disposed towards the Maquis either. Several rebels - including Matías – want to be more violent, and believe that it is necessary to kill many people to win the fight. Others, like Manuel, are caught in a dilemma because they want to fight Franco's oppression, but they don't want there to be too much blood.

The point of view most represented in the film is that of people who do not have weapons with which they can fight. They are the women, and also the men who are not rebels or soldiers. When Franco's soldiers invade the town, the Maquis run and the others have to face the consequences. This injustice is visible throughout the film, and shows that the bravest are not always the soldiers.

== Film techniques ==
Director Montxo Armendariz uses a variety of cinematographic techniques to create the atmosphere of his film. First of all, their use of lighting and music is very impressive. His ways of setting the tone of "Broken Silence" are effective, and move the audience.

The weather and the seasons play an important role in this movie. To change the year, Armendariz uses a dramatic change in weather. After Matías' death in the spring of 1946, the rain changes into snow. Suddenly, it is the winter of 1948, and everything has gotten worse in the village.

Armendariz illustrates this change with shades and gray and black colors. At the beginning of the film, everything was covered in light - the atmosphere matched the hope carried by the main characters and the guerrillas of the town. In 1948, Lucía has returned after the birth of her daughter, and is looking for Manuel, her love. But she finds a town very different from the home she came from - her friends and relatives are dead or they are shelters. During her visit to the town, she witnessed the murders of her aunt, Don Hilario, Manuel, and Rosario. With his use of lighting, the director forces us to feel the same loss of hope as the characters in Broken Silence.

Another method Armendariz uses to move his audience is music. The soundtrack matches the tone and theme of the songs that appear throughout the film. In 1946, the guerrillas or maquis sing political songs at the bar, and share a sense of hope. Sebas plays his harmonica in many scenes, and Lucía sings when she is cleaning. But in 1948, nobody sings. The characters have lost their hope, and they have lost their desire to sing. But at the end of the film this quote form Bertold Brecht appears: “Will they sung too in dark times? They will also sing about dark times. "

== See also ==
- List of Spanish films of 2001
