= Puy Oria =

Spanish film producer

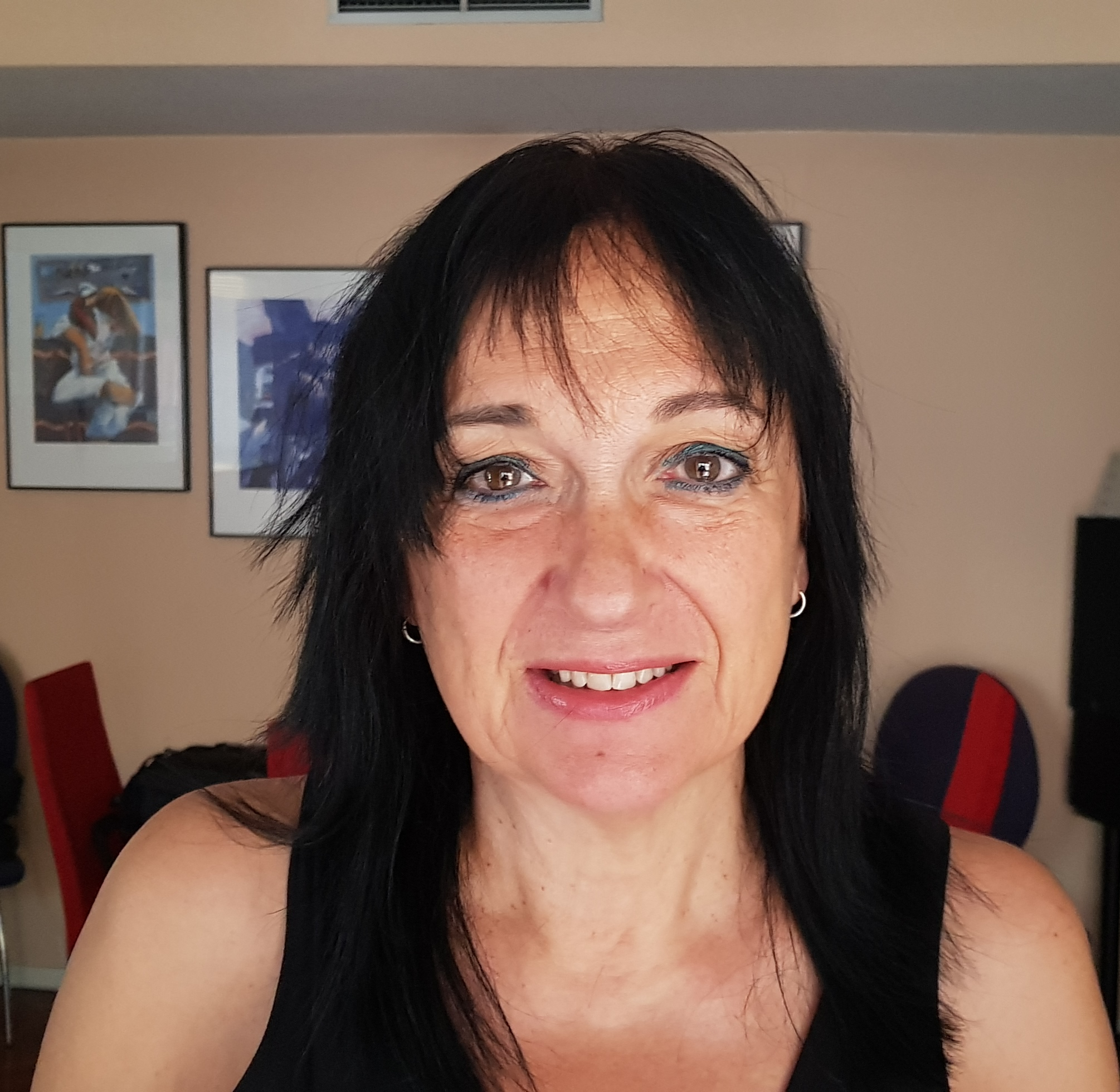
- Born: Torres del Rio, Spain
- Occupation: film producer

Puy Oria Rubio (born 1962, Torres del Rio, Navarre) is a Spanish film producer. Some of her most recognised films are Obaba, Don't Be Afraid and Secrets of the Heart.

== Career ==
Oria started her film career with Elías Querejeta in Letters from Alou (Montxo Armendáriz,1990). Then, she was involved in production work on movies such as Dream of Light (Víctor Erice,1992), Jamón, Jamón (Bigas Luna, 1992), ¡Dispara! (Carlos Saura,1993), Días Contados (Imanol Uribe, 1994), The Turkish Passion (Vicente Aranda, 1994), Stories from the Kronen (Montxo Armendáriz, 1994), La ley de la frontera (Adolfo Aristarain, 1995), and Deep Crimson (Arturo Ripstein, 1996).

In 1999, she set up, together with Montxo Armendáriz, the audiovisual production company Oria Films, a company with which she has produced, among others, the feature films Broken Silence (Montxo Armendáriz, 2001), La Guerrilla de la Memoria (Javier Corcuera,1992), Obaba (Montxo Armendáriz, 2005), Don't Be Afraid (Montxo Armendáriz, 2011).

She has taught on the subject of audio-visual production courses, lectures and workshops, has also collaborated with several film festivals as a jury member and she has held positions in associations, as Asociación Madrileña del Audiovisual (AMA), where she was president since its constitution in 2007, until 2018. She is a member of Academy of Cinematographic Arts and Sciences of Spain. Since 2018, president of the PIAF (Federation of Independent Audio-visual Production Companies).

Since 2017, Oria presides over the audiovisual management consultant ConsultOria Films, a company that she started up with several colleagues who make up a multidisciplinary group for the comprehensive online assessment of audiovisual projects and that it was born with the vocation of being a meeting place for the sector.

== Awards ==
2006 – Nominated for the 20th Goya Awards in the category of Best Production Direction for the feature film Obaba.

2015 – Pau i Justicia Award at the 7th edition of the International Film and Human Rights Festival-Humans Fest.

2017 – Tribute at the Outdoor Film Festival of Bueño (Asturias).

2019 – Simone de Beauvoir Award at the XXIV Zinemakumeak gara! (XXIV Showcase of films directed by women).

She is also a member of the board of directors of the Real Sociedad Económica Matritense de Amigos del País.
