= Le Dernier Diamant =

- Directed by: Éric Barbier
- Written by: Éric Barbier; Marie Eynard; Trân-Minh Nam
- Produced by: Farid Lahouassa; Aïssa Djabri
- Starring: Bérénice Bejo; Yvan Attal; Jean-François Stévenin; Annie Cordy
- Cinematography: Denis Rouden
- Edited by: Jennifer Augé
- Music by: Renaud Barbier
- Distributed by: Océan Films Distribution
- Release date: April 30, 2014
- Running time: 108 minutes
- Country: France
- Language: French
- Budget: $13.6 million
- Box office: $1.1 million

Le Dernier Diamant (lit. The Last Diamond) is a 2014 French crime thriller film directed and co-written by Éric Barbier.

== Plot summary ==
Simon Carrerra is an aging con artist and thief who has recently made parole after several years in prison. He fakes an injury to convince his parole officer, Matthias, that he is not planning to return to crime, then robs a hotel safe with the help of his elderly partner and mentor Albert. The score proves too small, and a desperate Simon agrees to Albert's request that he take part in an upcoming jewel heist.

The heist, organized by a former military officer named Scylla, involves the "Florentin", a diamond said to be cursed. The Florentin is currently owned by Julie Neuville, who inherited it from her mother Marie after the latter's apparent suicide from an overdose. Though obliged to auction off the Florentin in accordance with Marie's wishes, Julia insists on taking a hands-on role, which puts her at odds with her father Pierre and businessman Jacques Galley, who is executing Marie's estate.

At Scylla's direction, Simon poses as a security specialist formerly employed by Marie to gain Julie's trust. This allows him to steal a key needed by Scylla's men to bypass the Florentin's protective measures; unfortunately, the time he spends with the cultured and attractive Julie result in Simon falling in love with her. His emotional state worsens when Albert's ill health convinces him to retire to Paris, leaving Simon with no friends to turn to when he needs them the most.

Matthias finds a train ticket stub to Antwerp (the location of the auction) in Simon's coat pocket during one of his check-ins. He attempts to contact the police but is stopped by two men identifying themselves as cops. They reveal that the heist crew is already known to the authorities, and the heist itself is a trap intended to catch them. Indeed, when Simon and Scylla carry out the planned theft, they are swiftly intercepted and taken into custody, with Julie learning of Simon's true identity after seeing him being led outside in cuffs.

Pierre calls the police to ask them what's happening but learns to his surprise that no officers were sent to the auction. Galley then calls Julie to inform her that his own security key is missing. Back outside, the "cops" reveal themselves as additional members of the crew and take Simon and Scylla to a boat that will transport them out of the country. As a melancholic Simon reflects below deck on his feelings for Julie, Scylla and his enforcer murder the rest of the crew and fake evidence of a shootout before cutting the boat adrift. When Simon goes up to investigate, he is shot in the chest and falls overboard, seemingly drowning.

Julie is interrogated by the cops for unwittingly helping Simon, but lacking proof to charge her, she is set free. Simon turns out to still be alive and steals a car to drive back to Paris, where he ambushes Albert under the mistaken assumption that his mentor betrayed him. After the old man convinces him otherwise, Simon digs into Scylla's background and finds a link to one of Pierre's old business associates, who previously worked with Scylla back when he was still employed by the government. He also finds proof that Scylla most likely orchestrated Marie's death.

Tracking down Julie, he initially argues with her for his lies and deception but ultimately convinces her to confront Pierre. As suspected, Pierre breaks down and confesses that he was responsible for what happened to Marie; when she discovered his plans to sell the diamond behind her back, he asked Scylla to intimidate her. Instead, she was killed as a warning so he would not betray Scylla, who plans to sell the Florentin to a wealthy Russian collector.

Knowing that Julie will never be proven innocent unless the Florentin is recovered, Simon works out a plan. He arranges for a duplicate of the Florentin to be manufactured and has Julie practice sleight-of-hand. Albert creates prosthetics so Julie can impersonate an expert hired by Pierre to authenticate the Florentin for Scylla. With Pierre watching, Julie is able to flawlessly switch out the diamonds while convincing the Russian that he has been duped. However, before they can leave, Pierre accidentally says her name and an enraged Scylla tears off her disguise.

As Scylla and the Russian flee, Simon deliberately rams their car with his own, killing everyone except Scylla, Pierre, Pierre's associate (who is quickly subdued by Albert), and Julie. Pierre attacks Scylla to buy Julie time to run and is shot dead. Scylla then catches up to Julie and begins to strangle her before Simon intervenes and holds him at gunpoint. Just then, the police arrive. Scylla and the associate are convicted and given long sentences, but Simon gets a shorter one due to his efforts. Upon his release, Albert takes him on what he claims will be their last job together. To Simon's happy surprise, the "score" turns out to be Julie.

== Cast ==
- Bérénice Bejo as Julia Neuville
- Yvan Attal as Simon Carrerra
- Jean-François Stévenin as Albert
- Antoine Basler as Scylla
- Jacques Spiesser as Pierre Neuville
- Annie Cordy as Inès de Boissière
- Michel Israel as Jacques Galley
- Charlie Dupont as Michael Wurtz
- Fabrice Boutique as Kopel
- Michel Tereba as Matthias
- Isaka Sawadogo as Omar
- Leila Schaus as Sam
- Corentin Lobet as Le Fourgue
