= Good Behavior (TV series) =

American drama television series

- Genre: Drama
- Created by: Chad Hodge; Blake Crouch
- Based on: Good Behavior by Blake Crouch
- Starring: Michelle Dockery; Juan Diego Botto; Terry Kinney; Lusia Strus; Nyles Julian Steele; Joey Kern
- Opening theme: "Hard Time" by Seinabo Sey
- Country of origin: United States
- Original language: English
- No. of seasons: 2
- No. of episodes: 20 (list of episodes)

Production
- Executive producers: Chad Hodge; Blake Crouch; Marty Adelstein; Becky Clements
- Producers: Dana Baratta; Brett Johnson; Chitra Elizabeth Sampath; Aaron Fullerton
- Production location: North Carolina
- Production companies: Tomorrow Studios; Storyland; Studio T

Original release
- Network: TNT
- Release: November 15, 2016 – December 17, 2017

Good Behavior is an American drama television series based on the novel of the same name by Blake Crouch. The series stars Michelle Dockery as Leticia "Letty" Raines, a professional thief who becomes involved with a hitman named Javier Pereira, played by Juan Diego Botto.

TNT picked up the pilot to a 10-episode series in December 2015. The series premiered on November 15, 2016. On January 14, 2017, it was renewed for a second season, which premiered on October 15, 2017.

On November 6, 2018, TNT canceled the series after two seasons.

== Overview ==
Letty Raines—a thief, con artist, and drug user—is released from prison on good behavior, and is intent on regaining custody of her 10-year-old son Jacob. Her mother, Estelle, has custody and, because of Letty's incarceration, has a restraining order of protection that restricts contact. Letty infrequently sees her parole officer, Christian, who is exasperated by her attitude and lack of progress. While robbing a hotel room, Letty hides in the closet and overhears a discussion about a contract killing. Her unsuccessful effort to prevent the killing creates a series-long involvement with the killer, Javier, to the point of a complicated personal relationship.

== Cast ==
=== Main cast ===
- Michelle Dockery as Leticia 'Letty' Raines
- Juan Diego Botto as Javier Pereira
- Lusia Strus as Estelle Raines, Letty's mother
- Terry Kinney as Christian Woodhill, Letty's parole officer
- Nyles Steele as Jacob Raines, Letty's son
- Joey Kern as Rob McDaniels, Estelle's boyfriend, a high-school acquaintance of Letty's (season 2; recurring in season 1)

=== Recurring cast ===
- Ann Dowd as Rhonda Lashever, a tenacious FBI agent determined to catch Javier
- María Botto as Ava, Javier's sister
- Todd Williams as Sean, Letty's ex-boyfriend, Jacob's father
- Gideon Emery as Silk, Ava's ex-husband, a mortuary worker who disposes of bodies for Javier
- Isabella Alberti as Daniela, Ava and Silk's daughter, Javier's niece
- Gabriella Garcia as Sofia, Ava and Silk's daughter, Javier's niece
- Collette Wolfe as Tiffany Dash, a friend of Letty's from high school (season 1)
- Justin Bruening as Kyle Dash, Tiffany's husband (season 1)
- Laura Bell Bundy as Carin, Javier and Letty's temporary neighbor and friend (season 2)
- Juan Riedinger as Teo, a childhood friend of Javier & former lover of Ava who reenters their lives unexpectedly

== Episodes ==
Season	Episodes	Originally released	
Season	Episodes	First released	Last released
1	10	November 15, 2016	January 10, 2017
2	10	October 15, 2017	December 17, 2017

== Reception ==
Good Behavior has received mostly positive reviews from television critics. Review aggregator website Rotten Tomatoes reported a 78% "fresh" rating based on 23 reviews. The website's consensus reads, "Emotional manipulation aside, Good Behavior is a legitimately suspenseful and sexy drama." Metacritic reported a score of 65 out of 100 based on 22 reviews, indicating "generally favorable reviews".

== Filming ==
The series was filmed predominantly in Wilmington, North Carolina, both on location and at EUE/Screen Gems studios. The pilot was filmed from September to October 2015, while season one was filmed from March to July 2016. Filming for season two began on April 10, 2017, and ended on September 8, 2017.
