= Olga Rodríguez (journalist) =

Spanish journalist and author

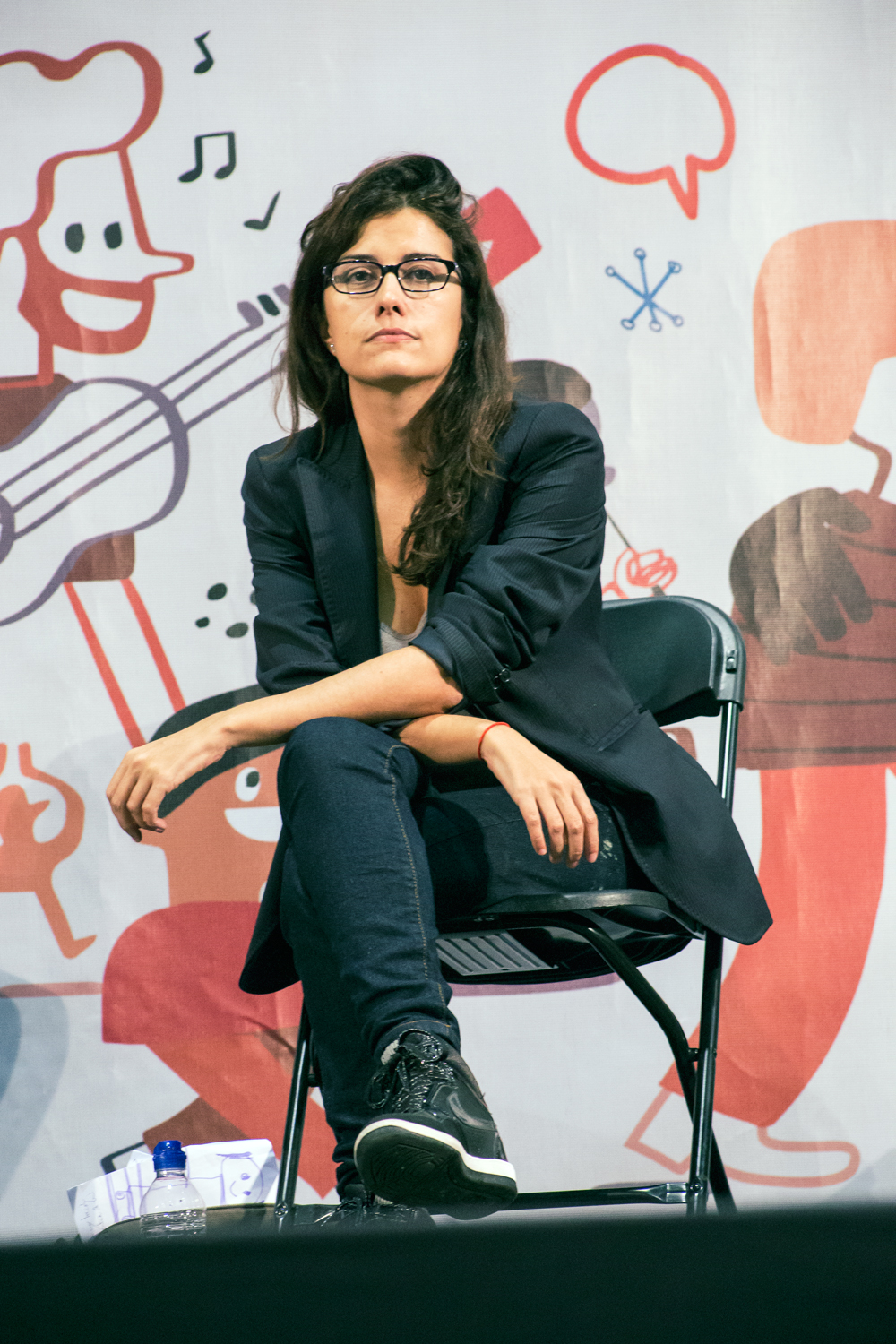
- During a rally of Barcelona en Comú in 2015
- Born: Olga Rodríguez Francisco; 1975 (age 50–51); León, Spain
- Education: Complutense University of Madrid
- Occupations: Journalist; writer
- Spouse: Juan Diego Botto (m. 2017)
- Children: 1

Olga Rodríguez Francisco (born 1975) is a Spanish journalist and author, specialised in the Middle East and human rights.

== Biography ==
Born in León in 1975 to journalist parents, she moved to Valladolid as a teenager, later moving to Madrid to study at the university. She earned a licentiate degree in Information Sciences (Journalism) from the Complutense University of Madrid (UCM).

She earned early recognition for her chronicles of the Iraq War on Cadena SER, also working for Cuatro and CNN+. She was a direct witness of the killing of Spanish journalist José Couso in April 2003 in the Palestine Hotel of Baghdad. She was also stationed in Afghanistan, Egypt, Iran, Lebanon, Yemen, Syria and Jordan.

She was one of the co-founders of eldiario.es in 2012, and worked there, as press ombudswoman and deputy director.

In 2017, after several years of relationship and a daughter in common, she married actor Juan Diego Botto, with whom she co-penned the screenplay of the film On the Fringe, shot in 2021.

== Works ==
- — (2004). Aquí Bagdad. Crónica de una guerra.
- — (2009). El hombre mojado no teme la lluvia. Voces de Oriente Medio. Madrid: Debate.
- — (2012). Yo muero hoy. Las revueltas en el mundo árabe. Madrid: Debate.
