= Cristina Rota =

Argentine-Spanish actress, producer and drama teacher (born 1945)

María Cristina Rota Fernández (born 1945) is an Argentine-born playwright, actress, director and popular acting coach settled in Spain.

== Biography ==
Cristina Rota was born in 1945 in La Plata, Argentina. She has ancestors from the Canary Islands and Navarre. She studied philosophy and arts, after which she trained in acting, and—already in Argentina—began to primarily focus on dramatic coaching.

With actor Diego Fernando Botto (kidnapped and assassinated during the Videla dictatorship) she had children María and Juan Diego. She left Argentina for Spain in 1978 with her children, while she was pregnant with a third child, Nur Al Levi, by another partner. In addition to her three children, all thespians, many famous Spanish actors have trained in her school, including Penélope Cruz, Antonio de la Torre, Marta Etura and Raúl Arévalo.

== Filmography ==
- Colores, 2003
- Party Line, 1994
- En penumbra, 1987
- Virtudes Bastián, 1986
- La reina del mate, 1985

=== As a producer ===
- Los abajo firmantes, 2003
