= María Botto =

Argentine-Spanish actress (born 1974)

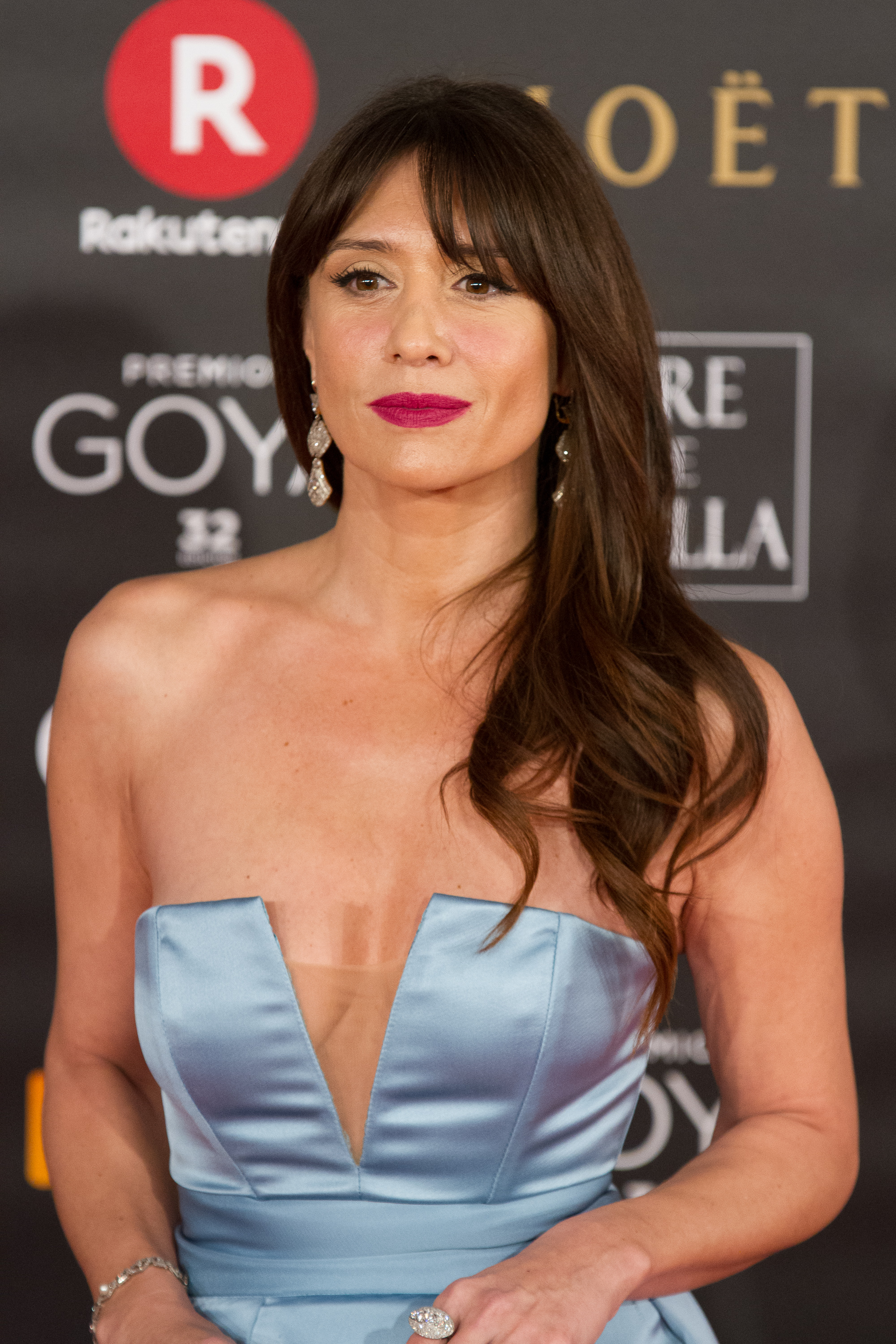
- At the 32nd Goya Awards in 2018
- Born: 10 February 1974 (age 52); Buenos Aires, Argentina
- Other name: María Botto Rota
- Occupation: Actress
- Years active: 1984-present
- Mother: Cristina Rota
- Relatives: Juan Diego Botto (brother)

María Florencia Botto Rota (born 10 February 1974) is an Argentine-Spanish actress. In 1978, she moved to Spain with her mother Cristina Rota and her brother Juan Diego Botto, also actors.

She made her feature film debut at age 10, with a performance in Berta's Motives. On television, she portrayed the recurring role of Ava Pereira, sister of Juan Diego Botto's character Javier, on the TNT drama series Good Behavior.

== Filmography ==
Key
†	Denotes works that have not yet been released

=== Film ===
Year	Title	Role	Notes	Ref.
1984	Los motivos de Berta (Berta's Motives)		Film debut	
1989	Si te dicen que caí (If They Tell You I Fell)			
1999	Celos (Jealousy)	Cinta Vidal		
2001	Silencio roto (Broken Silence)	Lola		
2003	Soldados de Salamina (Soldiers of Salamina)	Conchi		
2003	Carmen	Fernanda		
2003	Los abajo firmantes (With George Bush on My Mind)	Laura	Also a co-writer	
2004	Seres queridos (Only Human)	Tania		
2004	María querida (Dearest Maria)	Lola		
2005	El penalti más largo del mundo (The Longest Penalty Shot in the World)	Ana		
2007	Barcelona (un mapa) (Barcelona (A Map))	Violeta		
2008	Paisito (Small Country)	Rosana		
2008	Animales de compañía	Sofía		
2009	My Life in Ruins	Lala		
2013	3 bodas de más (Three Many Weddings)	jefa de Ruth		
2015	Hablar	Piedad		
2015	De chica en chica (Girl Gets Girl)	Sofía		
2016	Risen	Mary Magdalene		
2020	Malnazidos (Valley of the Dead)	Sor Flor		
2022	Código Emperador (Code Emperor)	Charo		
2022	Hustle	Paola		
2023	De perdidos a Río			
2024	Odio el verano (I Hate Summer)	Fátima		
2025	The Night My Dad Saved Christmas 2	Pilar	Netflix release	

=== Television ===
Year	Title	Role	Notes	Ref.
2000	Un chupete para ella			
2005–06	7 días al desnudo	Marta Castillo		
2007	Círculo rojo	Andrea Onieva		
2009–10	Pelotas	Marta		
2016	Bajo sospecha	Sara Guzmán	Introduced in season 2	
2016–17	Good Behavior	Ava	Recurring	
2018	Cuerpo de élite	Andrea Zimmerman		
2019	Cuéntame cómo pasó	Fabiola	Introduced in season 20	
2023	Mentiras pasajeras	Patricia		
2023	El otro lado (The Other Side)	Eva		

== Accolades ==
Year	Award	Category	Work	Result	Ref.
2000	14th Goya Awards	Best New Actress	Jealousy	Nominated	
2004	18th Goya Awards	Best Supporting Actress	Soldiers of Salamina	Nominated	
2004	13th Actors and Actresses Union Awards	Best Film Actress in a Secondary Role	Soldiers of Salamina	Nominated	
