= Mexican Coke =

Coca-Cola bottled in Mexico

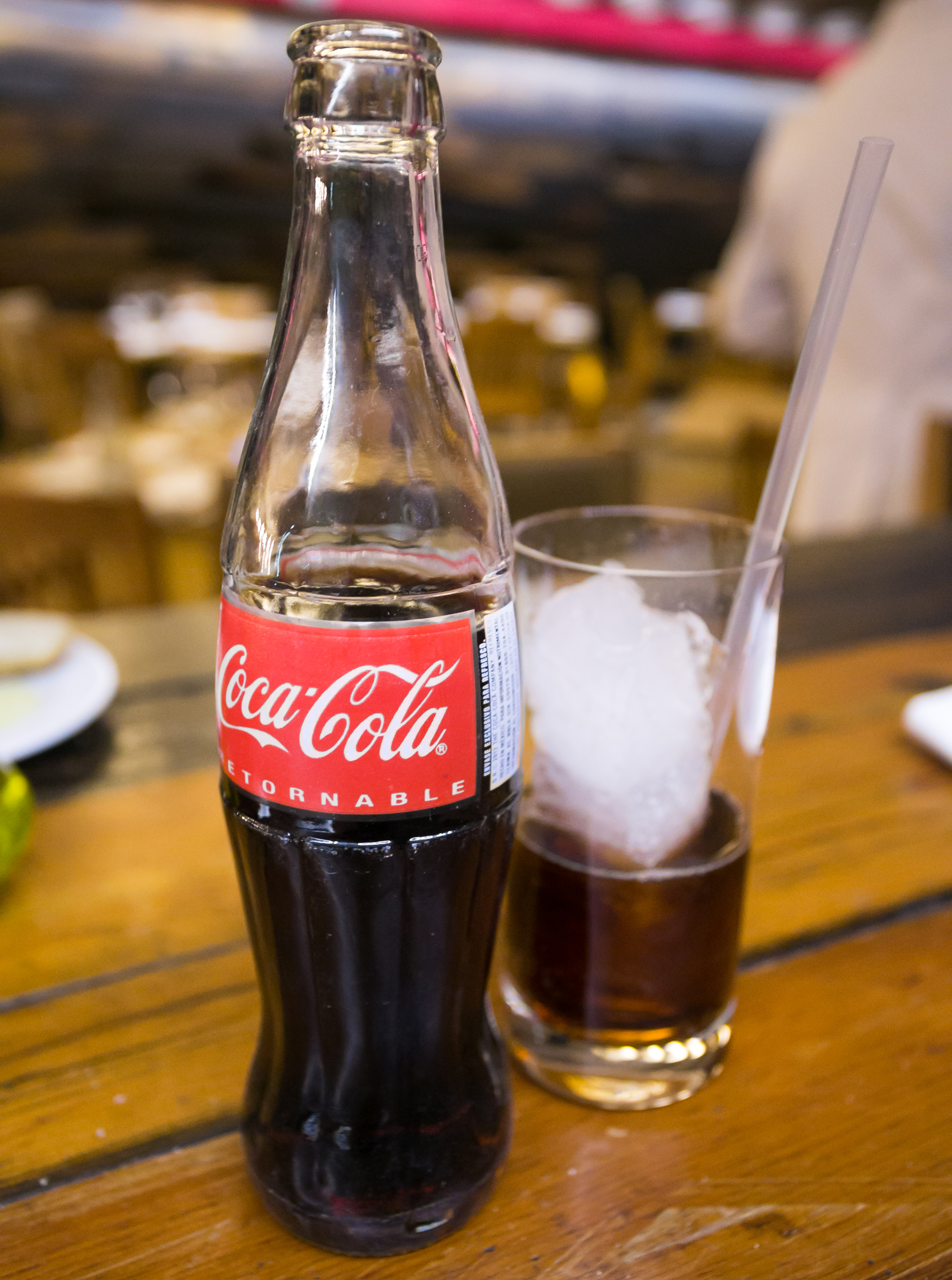
- Bottle of Mexican Coca-Cola
- Product type: Cola
- Current owner: The Coca-Cola Company
- Country: Mexico
- Introduced: 1921; 105 years ago

In the United States, Mexican Coca-Cola, or Mexican Coke (Spanish: Coca Cola de Vidrio, transl. Glass Coca-Cola or Coca-Cola in a glass bottle) or, informally, "Mexicoke", refers to Coca-Cola produced in and imported from Mexico. The Mexican formula that is exported into the U.S. is sweetened with white sugar instead of the high-fructose corn syrup used in the American formula since the early 1980s. Some tasters have said that Mexican Coca-Cola tastes better, while other blind tasting tests reported no differences in flavor.

== History ==
The Coca-Cola Company opened its first bottling franchise in Mexico around 1921 with Grupo Tampico, and then Grupo ARMA. Monterrey-based FEMSA is currently the largest Coca-Cola bottler in Mexico and most of Latin America.

In the U.S. food industry, high-fructose corn syrup is a cheaper alternative sweetener to sucrose (standard sugar) because of production quotas of domestic sugar, import tariffs on foreign sugar, and subsidies of U.S. corn, among other factors. As a result, The Coca-Cola Company and other U.S. soft drink makers began transitioning to high-fructose corn syrup for U.S. markets in 1980, before completely switching over in 1984. However, these companies continue to use sugar in other countries due to health regulations and/or a lack of comparable benefits for using corn syrup.

The Coca-Cola Company originally imported the Mexican-produced version into the U.S. primarily to sell it to Mexican immigrants who grew up with that formula. Mexican Coke was first sold at grocers who served Latino clientele, but as its popularity grew among non-Latinos, by 2009 larger chains like Costco, Sam's Club and Kroger began to stock it. Since then it has become readily available at grocery stores throughout the United States.

A 2012 scientific analysis of Mexican Coke found no sucrose (standard sugar), but instead found total fructose and glucose levels similar to other soft drinks sweetened with high-fructose corn syrup, though in different ratios, but a response to that study said that sucrose hydrolyzes to its components in acid environments very fast.

In 2013, a Mexican Coca-Cola bottler announced it would stop using cane sugar in favor of glucose-fructose syrup, to comply with changes to the Mexican food labeling law. It later clarified this change would not affect those bottles specifically exported to the United States as "Coca-Cola Nostalgia" products.

== Taste ==
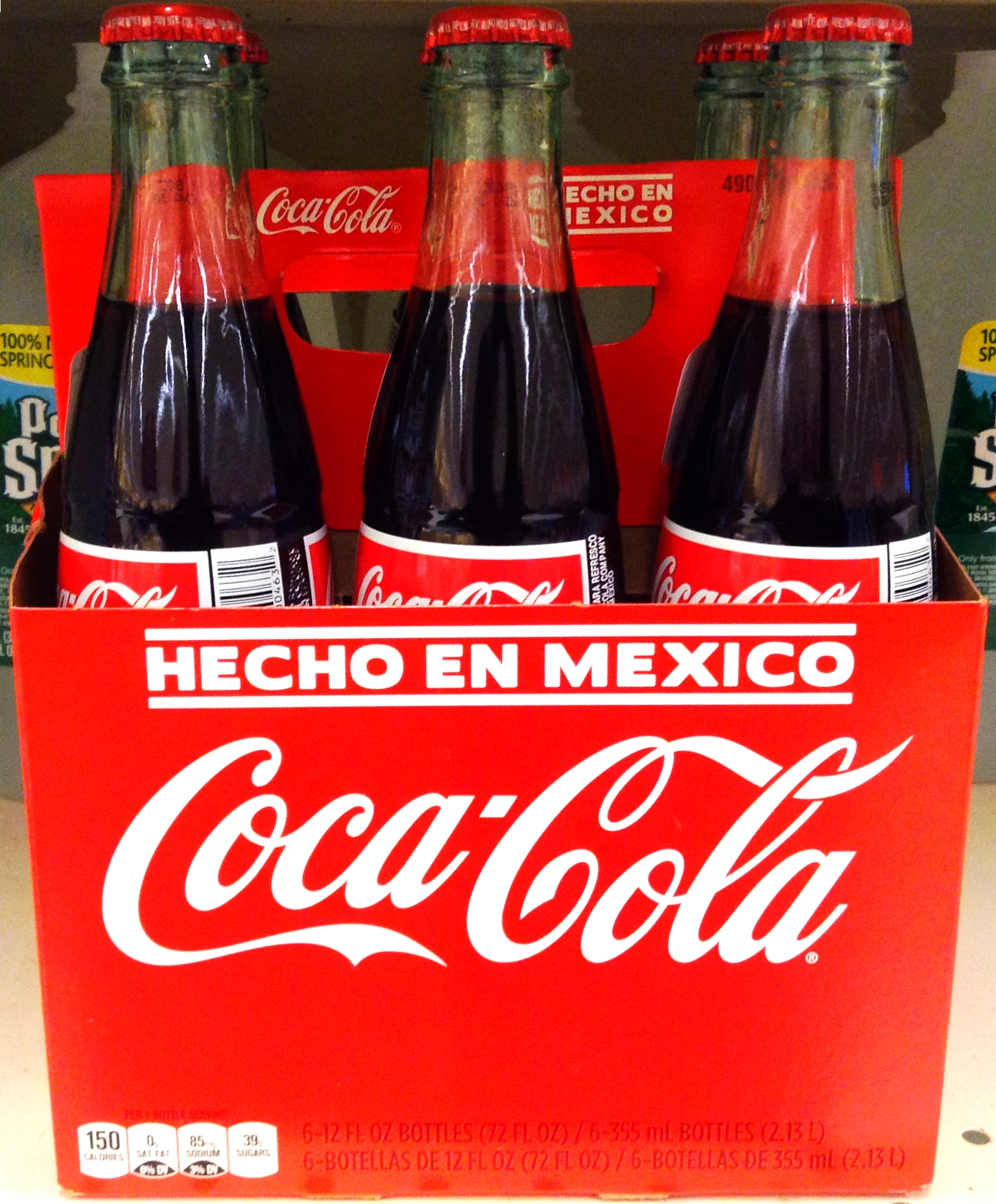
Mexican Coke is often sold in the United States to cater to both the "nostalgic factors" it evokes and the perception that it tastes different from the U.S. product, which uses corn sweetener instead of cane sugar.

Results from taste tests have been mixed. In a tasting conducted by a local Westchester, New York magazine, some tasters noted that the Mexican Coke had "a more complex flavor with an ineffable spicy and herbal note", and that it contained something "that darkly hinted at root beer or old-fashioned sarsaparilla candies". However, participants in a different double-blind test preferred American Coca-Cola. Participants in taste tests conducted by Coca-Cola and others reported no perceptible differences in flavor between American Coke and the Mexican formulation.

== Bottle ==
Mexican Coca-Cola is sold in a thick 355 ml (12.0 US fl oz) or 500 ml (17 US fl oz) glass bottle, which some have contrasted as being "more elegant, with a pleasingly nostalgic shape," compared to the more common plastic American Coca-Cola bottles. Formerly, Coca-Cola was widely available in refundable and non-refundable glass bottles of various sizes in the U.S., but nearly all bottlers began replacing most glass bottles with plastic during the late 1980s. Most exporters of Mexican Coke affix a paper sticker on each bottle containing the nutrition facts label, ingredients, and bottler and/or exporter's contact information, to meet US food labeling requirements.

Adding to the nostalgia factor, the Mexican Coca-Cola glass bottle does not have a twist-off cap as plastic bottles do.

== New Zealand ==
A similar phenomenon exists in New Zealand, where Coca-Cola is available both bottled locally (sweetened with cane sugar) and imported from the United States (with high-fructose corn syrup).

== See also ==
- Pepsi-Cola Made with Real Sugar, a line of Pepsi products flavored with cane sugar
