= 7 días al desnudo =

- Genre: Sitcom
- Developed by: Videomedia
- Directed by: Jesús Font; Ricardo Solla
- Starring: Javier Veiga; Iñaki Miramón; Maria Botto; Laura Pamplona
- Country of origin: Spain
- Original language: Spanish
- No. of seasons: 1
- No. of episodes: 11

Production
- Running time: 60 minutes (including commercials)

Original release
- Network: Cuatro
- Release: 22 December 2005 – 16 February 2006

7 días al desnudo (English:7 días exposed) was a Spanish TV sitcom which aired in Cuatro between 2005 and 2006. It was developed by Videomedia and directed by Jesús Font. It aired 11 episodes between 2005 and 2006.

== Plot ==
A married couple of journalists, Marta (María Botto) and Miguel (Javier Veiga) have different concepts of their profession, she likes information and he sensationalism but they live a happy life until the news magazine "7 días", hires Miguel as director instead of Marta, and he decides to make the magazine more frivolous.

== Cast ==
- Javier Veiga (Miguel Cimadevilla)
- Iñaki Miramón (Andrés Buenaventura)
- María Botto (Marta Castillo)
- Laura Pamplona (Julia Bartolomé)
- Juan Fernández (Gus Marina)
- Rosa Boladeras (Inés)
- David Bages (Santi)
- Patricia Conde (Sonsoles)
- Aída de la Cruz (Roxana)
