= Fabrice Boutique =

Belgian actor

Fabrice Boutique (born May 26, 1970 in Zaire (now Congo) is a Belgian actor of Braine-l'Alleud who is active on cinema, television, theater, musicals and dance.

== Selected filmography ==
- Illegal (2010)
- Supercondriaque (also known as Superchondriac) (2014) directed by Dany Boon
- Le Dernier Diamant (lit. The Last Diamond) (2014)
