= Darío Barrio =

Spanish television presenter

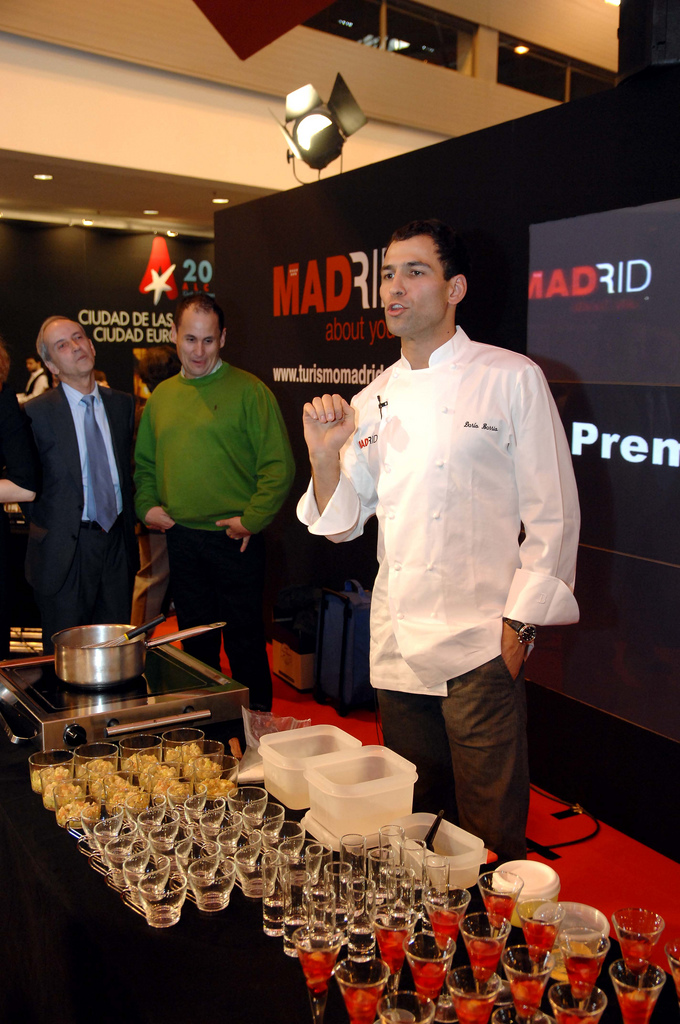
Darío Barrio in January 2009.

Darío Barrio Domínguez (11 December 1972 – 6 June 2014) was a Spanish television chef. He was best known for presenting Cuatro's Todos contra el chef for sixteen episodes from 2005 until 2006.

Barrio was born in Madrid and began cooking at the age of fourteen. After studying, he traveled to countries such as France, Switzerland, the UK and the US for thirteen years to cook.

Barrio died in a BASE jumping accident wearing a wingsuit on 6 June 2014 in Segura de la Sierra, Jaén, aged 42. The act was supposed to be a tribute to extreme-sportsman and television personality Álvaro Bultó, who died under similar circumstances in August 2013.

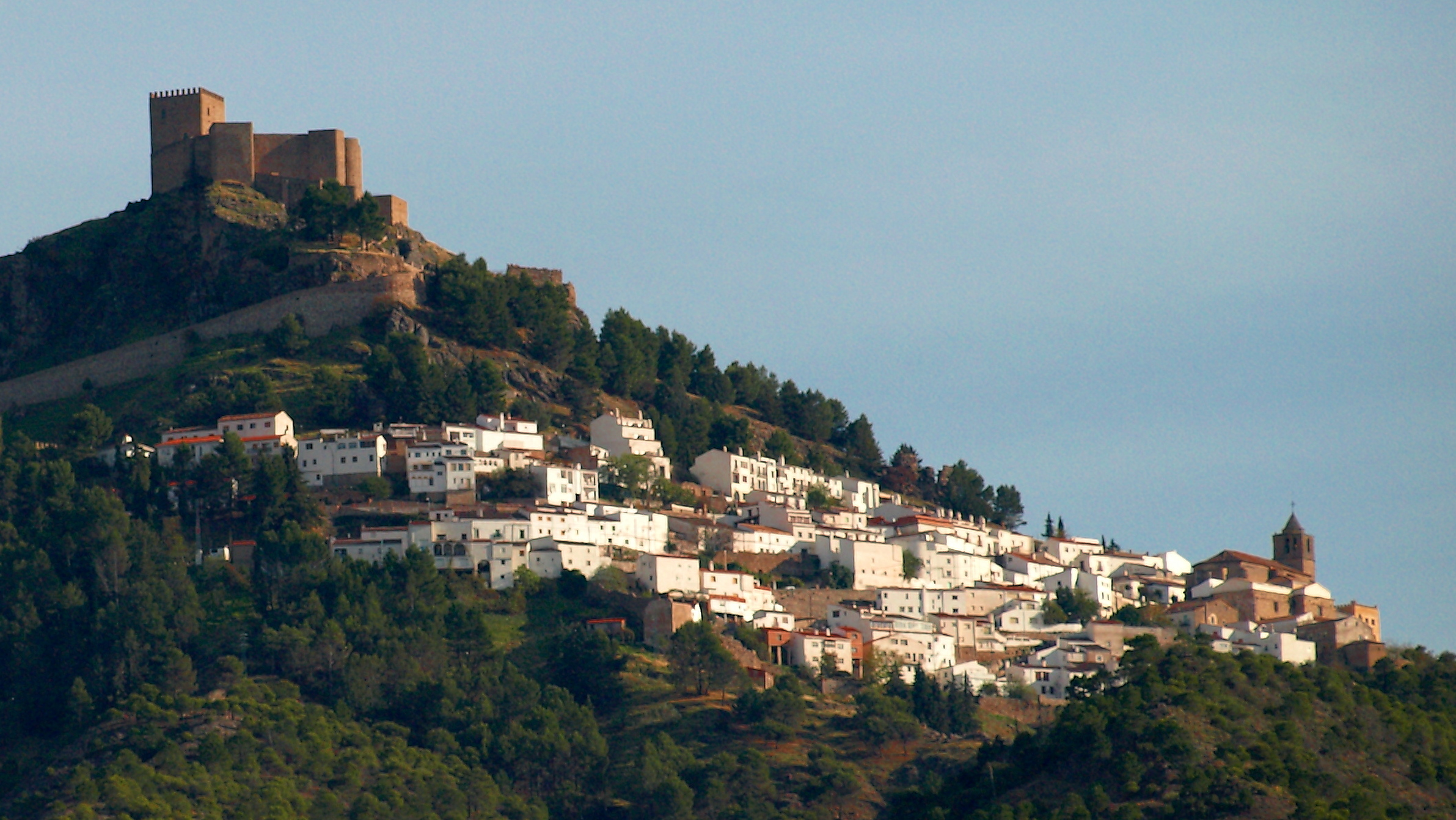
Segura de la Sierra, the location of Barrio's fatal wingsuit jump.
