= Juan Diego Botto =

Argentine-Spanish actor and director (born 1975)

- Botto in 2026
- Born: Juan Diego Botto Rota; 29 August 1975 (age 51); Buenos Aires, Argentina
- Occupations: Actor; director
- Years active: 1983–present
- Spouse: Olga Rodríguez (m. 2017)
- Children: 1
- Mother: Cristina Rota
- Relatives: María Botto (sister)

Juan Diego Botto Rota (born 29 August 1975) is an Argentine-Spanish film, stage and television actor.

Born in Argentina, he moved to Spain together with his mother (the actress and acting coach Cristina Rota) in 1978. Following early film appearances as a child actor, he landed a breakthrough role in the 1995 film Stories from the Kronen. He has since starred in films such as Martín (Hache) (1997), Plenilune (2000), Broken Silence (2001), Obaba (2005), Go Away from Me (2006) and Ismael (2013). He has also worked as a stage director and playwright and debuted as a film director with the 2022 social drama-thriller On the Fringe.

== Early life ==
Botto was born on 29 August 1975 in Buenos Aires, Argentina, son of Diego Fernando Botto Alduncín and Cristina Rota. His parents were both actors. His father (a member of the Peronist Youth and Montoneros) was kidnapped and murdered in 1977 during the Argentine Dirty War. In 1978, with his mother and older sister María, he moved to Madrid, Spain, where his younger sister, Nur Al Levi, was born. His sisters are both actresses. His mother taught acting classes out of their apartment, before creating her own academy.

Botto attended high school in New York and lived there for two years.

== Career ==
Botto studied acting at the school founded by his mother in Madrid, which later became the Centre for New Creators, based in the Sala Mirador. Later he moved to New York to continue his studies under the direction of Uta Hagen.

Botto's first film appearance was at the age of eight in the film Game of Power, by Fausto Canel (1983).

During the 1980s, Botto played small roles in films and appeared in the 1990 American television series Zorro. In 1992, he landed a role as the son of Christopher Columbus in the film 1492: Conquest of Paradise, by Ridley Scott. Three years later, he starred in the film Stories from the Kronen, an adaptation by Montxo Armendáriz of the novel of the same name, in which he achieved great success and popularity.

Botto's role in the 1999 film Sobreviviré (I Will Survive), about a woman who falls in love with a man who, unknown to her, is homosexual, got him more national and international recognition.

Botto's career has included films such as Martín (Hache), by the director Adolfo Aristarain; Broken Silence, by Montxo Armendáriz, Plenilunio, by Imanol Uribe, Asfalto, by Daniel Calparsoro; Go Away from Me, by Víctor García León; Todo lo que tú quieras, by Achero Mañas; as well as several works abroad, such as The Dancer Upstairs, directed by John Malkovich and starring Javier Bardem; Bordertown, by Gregory Nava, starring Jennifer Lopez; The Anarchist's Wife, by Marie Noëlle and Peter Sehr; and El Greco, by Yannis Smaragdis, for which he won the Best Actor Award at the Cairo Film Festival in 2008.

In his professional career, he has always combined cinema and theatre. He is the coordinator of the Sala Mirador theatre.

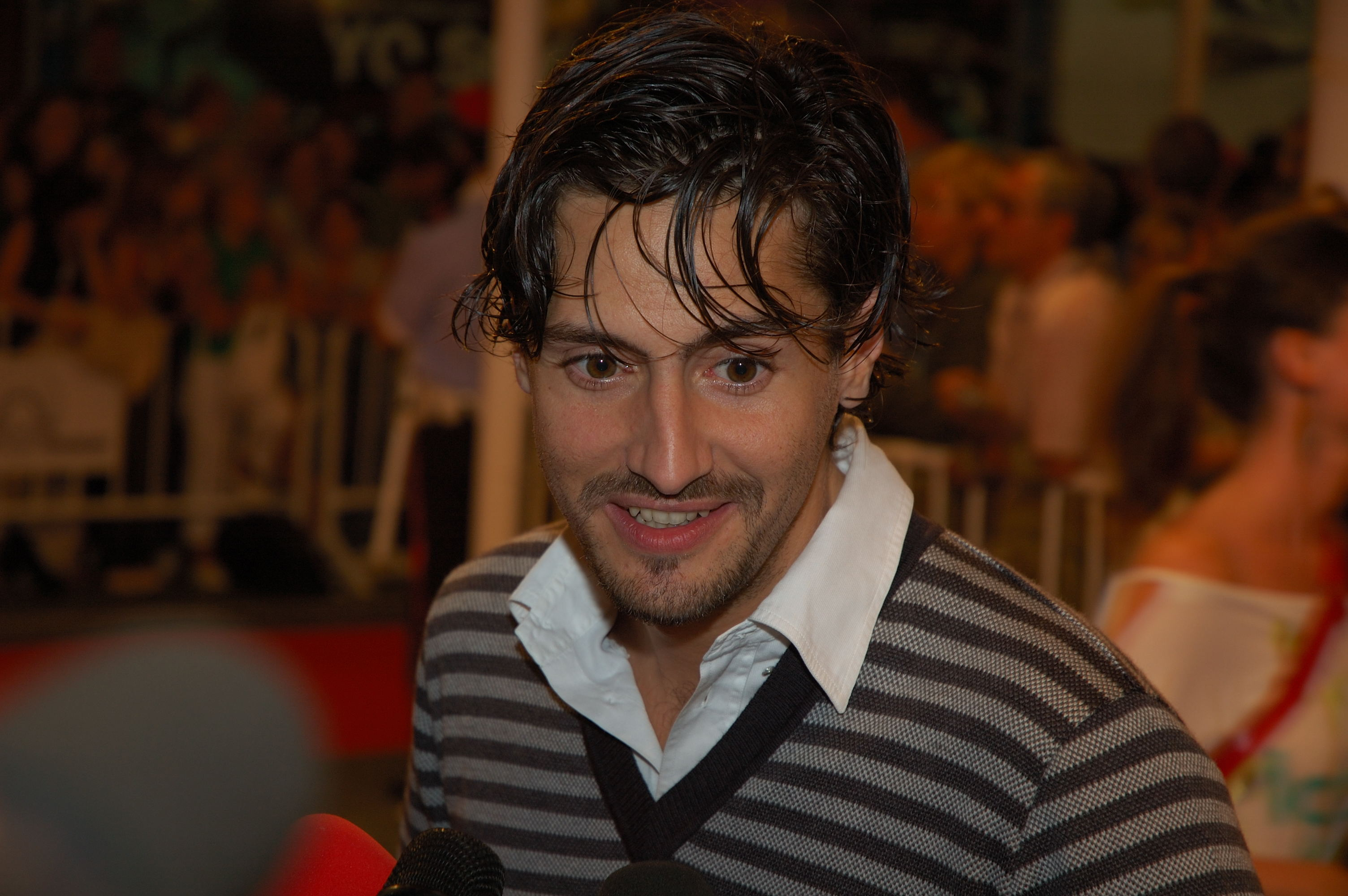
Juan Diego Botto in 2006

In 2005, he directed the play El privilegio de ser perro (The Privilege of Being a Dog), written by himself, about the tough life immigrants are subjected to while trying to sneak into and live in a new country. In December 2008, and after a tour throughout Spain, Hamlet premiered at the Theatre of María Guerrero in Madrid, which he directed and starred in, along with José Coronado, Marta Etura and Nieve de Medina, among others. He is also the author of the plays Despertares y celebraciones, directed by his mother Cristina Rota, and The Last Night of the Plague, directed by Víctor García León.

In 2012, he wrote the play Un trozo invisible de este mundo. The text, which deals with immigration and exile, mixes drama and humour with commitment. In it he acted, directed by Sergio Peris-Mencheta. In 2014, Botto won the Max Theater Awards for Best Actor and Best New Author for this work, which also won the Max Award for Best Play of the year.

He has received numerous cinematographic distinctions. He has been nominated for the Goya Awards four times for his appearances in the films Historias del Kronen, Plenilunio (2000), Vete de mí (2006) and Ismael (2013). His career in the theatre has also made him the winner of a Fotograma de Plata Award for best theatre actor in 2008 for his participation in Hamlet, as well as two Max Awards and a Cosmopolitan Award.

In the 2010s, he participated in the films Silencio en la Nieve (2012), by Gerardo Herrero, Ismael (2013), by Marcelo Piñeyro, Hablar (2015), by Joaquín Oristrell, and La ignorancia de la sangre (2014), by Manuel Gómez Pereira.

From 2016 to 2017, Botto starred in the TNT drama series Good Behavior, playing Javier, a charming hitman with a moral code who crosses paths with Letty (Michelle Dockery), a professional thief. Underneath their cold and calculating work, they both hide a harsh and dark family reality.

In January 2017, he worked on the suspense series Pulsaciones, on Antena 3, where he played Rodrigo Ugarte.

He played General Presidente Silvio Luna in the 2021 DC Extended Universe film The Suicide Squad, directed by James Gunn.

His debut as a feature film director is the film On the Fringe, selected for screening at the 79th Venice International Film Festival's Horizons section. In November 2026, Patricia (Botto's sophomore directorial feature) was announced to be in development.

== Personal life ==
Botto currently lives in Madrid with his wife, Spanish journalist and writer Olga Rodríguez. They have a daughter, Salma. He is also active in politics, protesting the 2003 war in Iraq and taking part in a support group for fellow children of the disappeared.

== Filmography ==
=== Film ===
Key
| † | Denotes films that have not yet been released |

| Year | Title | Role | Notes | Ref. |
|---|---|---|---|---|
| 1984 | Los motivos de Berta (Berta's Motives) | Luisito | | |
| 1986 | Teo el pelirrojo | Santiago | | |
| 1989 | Si te dicen que caí (If They Tell You I Fell) | | | |
| 1989 | Ovejas negras | Adolfo | Older version of Adolfo portrayed by Miguel Rellán | |
| 1991 | Cómo ser mujer y no morir en el intento | | | |
| 1992 | 1492: Conquest of Paradise | | | |
| 1995 | Historias del Kronen (Stories from the Kronen) | Carlos | | |
| 1996 | La sal de la vida | Charly | | |
| 1996 | Éxtasis | Aspirante | | |
| 1996 | La Celestina | Calisto | | |
| 1996 | Más que amor, frenesí (Not Love, Just Frenzy) | Carlos | | |
| 1997 | En brazos de la mujer madura (In Praise of Older Women) | Andrés | | |
| 1997 | Martín (Hache) | Hache | | |
| 1998 | Bin ich schön? (Am I Beautiful) | | | |
| 1999 | Novios (Couples) | Arturito | | |
| 1999 | Sobreviviré (I Will Survive) | Iñaki | | |
| 1999 | Ave María | Miguel | | |
| 2000 | Plenilunio (Plenilune) | El asesino | | |
| 2000 | Asfalto | Charly | | |
| 2001 | Silencio roto (Broken Silence) | Manuel | | |
| 2002 | Trece campanadas | Jacobo | | |
| 2002 | The Dancer Upstairs | Sucre | | |
| 2002 | El caballero Don Quijote (Don Quixote, Knight Errant) | Tosilos | | |
| 2003 | Los abajo firmantes (With George Bush on My Mind) | Jorge | Also co-writer | |
| 2004 | Roma | Manuel Cueto / Joaquín "Joaco" Góñez | Older version of Góñez portrayed by José Sacristán | |
| 2005 | Obaba | Miguel | | |
| 2005 | La fiesta del chivo (The Feast of the Goat) | Amadito García Guerrero | | |
| 2006 | Vete de mí (Go Away from Me) | Guillermo | | |
| 2006 | Va a ser que nadie es perfecto (Nobody Is Perfect) | | Bit part | |
| 2007 | El Greco | Fernando Niño de Guevara | | |
| 2007 | Bordertown | Marco A. Salamanca | | |
| 2008 | La mujer del anarquista (The Anarchist's Wife) | Justo Álvarez Calderón | | |
| —N/a | King Conqueror | —N/a | Unfinished film | |
| 2009 | Las viudas de los jueves (The Widows of Thursdays) | Gustavo | | |
| 2010 | Todo lo que tú quieras (Anything You Want) | Leo | | |
| 2012 | Silencio en la nieve (Frozen Silence) | Arturo Andrade | | |
| 2012 | O Theós agapáei to chaviári (God Loves Caviar) | Count Lefentarios | | |
| 2012 | Dictado (Childish Games) | Daniel | | |
| 2013 | Ismael | Luis | | |
| 2014 | La ignorancia de la sangre (The Ignorance of Blood) | Javier Falcón | | |
| 2017 | Los comensales | | | |
| 2020 | Rocambola | Saeta | | |
| 2020 | Los europeos (The Europeans) | Antonio | | |
| 2021 | The Suicide Squad | Silvio Luna | | |
| 2022 | En los márgenes (On the Fringe) | Manuel | Also director and co-writer | |
| 2022 | No mires a los ojos (Staring at Strangers) | Sergio O'Kane | | |
| 2024 | The Room Next Door | Photographer | | |
| 2025 | Los aitas (Breaking Walls) | Juanma | | |
| 2025 | Tras el verano (The Stepmother's Bond) | Raúl | | |
| 2025 | Mi amiga Eva (My Friend Eva) | Víctor | | |
| 2026 | Altas capacidades (Better Class) | Domingo | | |
| 2026 | Los relatos † (The Sentence) | Pablo | | |
| 2027 | Day Drinker † | | Post-production | |

=== Television ===
| Year | Title | Role | Notes | Ref. |
|---|---|---|---|---|
| 1990 | Zorro | Felipe (Don Diego de la Vega/Zorro's mute servant) | | |
| 1996 | Lucrecia | César | TV movie | |
| 2003 | Augustus | Iullus Antonius | TV film | |
| 2016-2017 | Good Behavior | Javier Pereira | Series lead | |
| 2017 | Pulsaciones | Rodrigo Ugarte | 10 episodes | |
| 2019 | Instincto | Pol | 5 episodes | |
| 2020 | White Lines | Oriol Calafat | 10 episodes | |
| 2020 | Tales of the Lockdown | | Director and writer | |
| 2022-2024 | Todos mienten | Sergio | 12 episodes | |
| 2022 | No me gusta conducir | Pablo Lopetegui | TV miniseries, 6 episodes | |
| 2025 | El Centro | Michelin | Lead Role | |

=== Music videos ===
- Somos Anormales (2017, music video)

== Director ==
- "Doble moral" (segment of the collective film ¡Hay motivo!; 2004)
- "Gourmet" (episode of the streaming series Relatos con-fin-a-dos; 2020)
- En los márgenes (2022)
- Patricia ( 2027)

== Theatre ==
- El privilegio de ser perro (2008)
- El ultimo dia de la peste (2010)
- Invisibles (2014)
- Una noche Sin Luna (2021)

== Accolades ==
| Year | Award | Category | Work | Result | Ref. |
|---|---|---|---|---|---|
| 1996 | 10th Goya Awards | Best New Actor | Stories from the Kronen | Nominated | |
| 2001 | 15th Goya Awards | Best Actor | Plenilunio | Nominated | |
| 2007 | 21st Goya Awards | Best Supporting Actor | Go Away from Me | Nominated | |
| 2007 | 16th Actors and Actresses Union Awards | Best Film Actor in a Secondary Role | Go Away from Me | Nominated | |
| 2010 | 19th Actors and Actresses Union Awards | Best Stage Actor in a Leading Role | Hamlet | Nominated | |
| 2013 | 22nd Actors and Actresses Union Awards | Best Stage Actor in a Leading Role | Un trozo invisible de este mundo | Nominated | |
| 2014 | 69th CEC Awards | Best Supporting Actor | Ismael | Nominated | |
| 2014 | 28th Goya Awards | Best Supporting Actor | Ismael | Nominated | |
| 2014 | 17th Max Awards | Best New Playwright | Un trozo invisible del mundo | Won | |
| 2014 | 17th Max Awards | Best Actor | Un trozo invisible del mundo | Won | |
| 2021 | 26th Forqué Awards | Best Film Actor | The Europeans | Nominated | |
| 2021 | 8th Feroz Awards | Best Supporting Actor (film) | The Europeans | Won | |
| 2021 | 35th Goya Awards | Best Supporting Actor | The Europeans | Nominated | |
| 2021 | National Theater Prize | | —N/a | Won | |
| 2022 | 30th Actors and Actresses Union Awards | Best Stage Actor in a Leading Role | Una noche sin luna | Won | |
| 2022 | 25th Max Awards | Best Actor | Una noche sin luna | Won | |
| 2023 | 10th Feroz Awards | Best Actor in a TV Series | I Don't Like Driving | Won | |
| 2023 | 37th Goya Awards | Best New Director | On the Fringe | Nominated | |
| 2025 | 33rd Actors and Actresses Union Awards | Best Film Actor in a Minor Role | The Room Next Door | Nominated | |
