= Madrileños por el mundo =

Spanish television show

Madrileños por el mundo (English: Madrilenians Around the World) is a travel show on Telemadrid directed by journalist Paloma Ferre. In this program, a team of reporters travels to various cities in the world to document the experiences of Madrilenians living abroad. The interviewees explain the reasons for their move, introduce the cities where they live and share the most interesting aspects of their daily life with the audience.

The program began as a special of Mi cámara y yo on 1 April 2005 and is shown as such in the opening sequence of all episodes up until July 2007, when it became a show of its own.
