= Melque de Cercos =

- Municipality
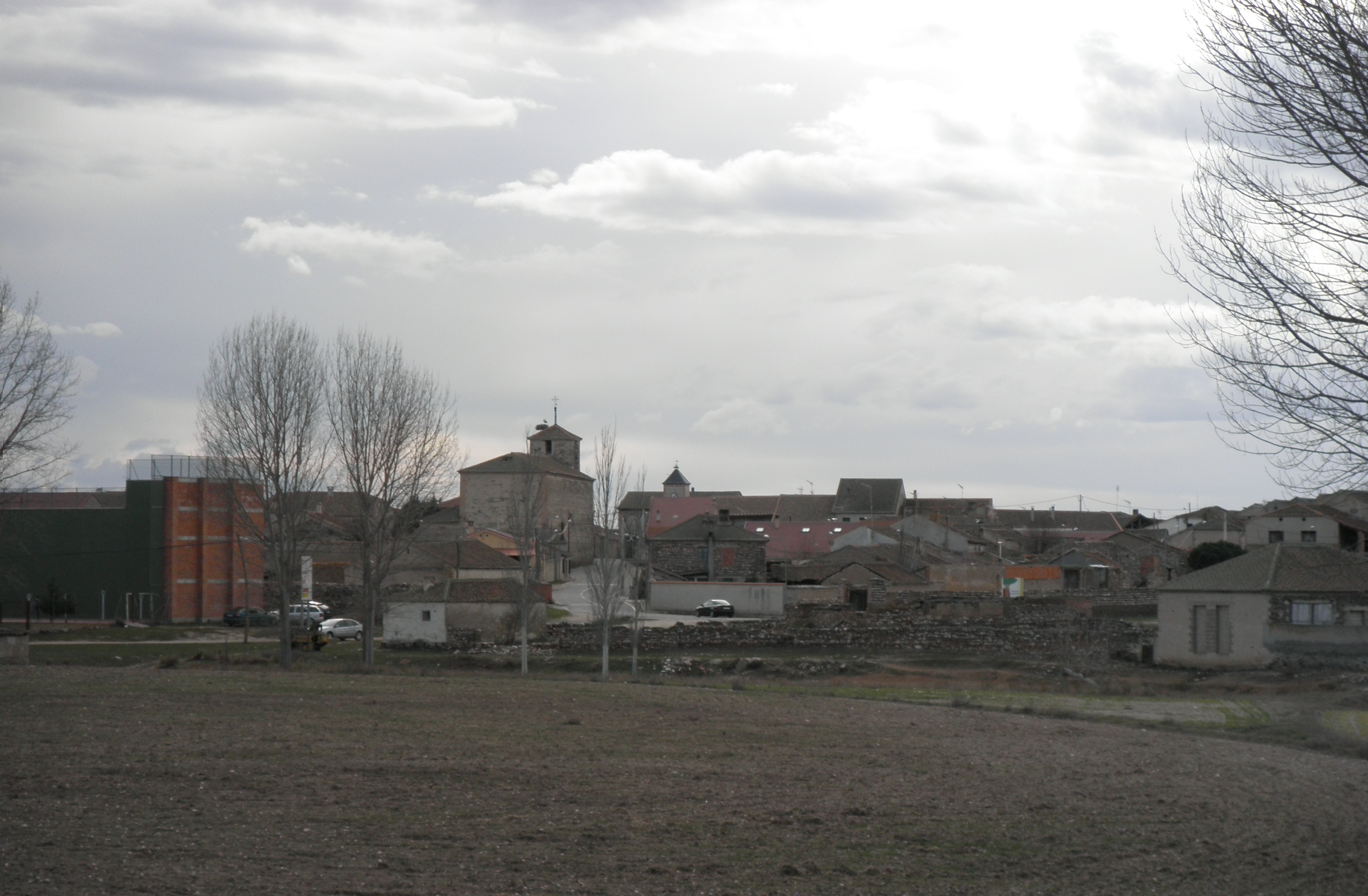

- Location in Spain. Melque de Cercos (Spain)
- Coordinates: 41°03′04″N 4°28′10″W
- Country: Spain
- Autonomous community: Castile and León
- Province: Segovia
- Municipality: Melque de Cercos

Area
  - Total: 18.59 km^{2} (7.18 sq mi)
- Elevation: 857 m (2,812 ft)

Population (2025-01-01)
  - Total: 58
  - Density: 3.1/km^{2} (8.1/sq mi)
- Time zone: UTC+1 (CET)
  - Summer (DST): UTC+2 (CEST)
- Website: Official website

Melque de Cercos is a municipality located in the province of Segovia, Castile and León, Spain. According to the 2013 census (INE), the municipality had a population of 94 inhabitants.
