= On Acting =

1986 book by actor Laurence Olivier

- First US edition
- Author: Laurence Olivier
- Language: English
- Publisher: Simon & Schuster (US); Weidenfeld & Nicolson (UK)
- Publication date: November 1986
- Publication place: UK
- Media type: Print (Hardcover and Paperback)
- Pages: 368 (hardcover edition)
- ISBN: 0-671-63034-2 (hardcover edition)
- OCLC: 234246359

On Acting is a book by Laurence Olivier. It was first published in 1986 when the actor was 79 years old. It consists partly of autobiographical reminiscences, partly of reflections on the actor's vocation.
