= Laurence Olivier Productions =

Mid-20th-century stage production company created by Laurence Olivier

Laurence Olivier Productions was a stage production company created by Laurence Olivier in the 1950s that also helped finance two films: Richard III and The Prince and the Showgirl.

In 1948, while on tour in Australia and New Zealand, Olivier was fired from the Old Vic. To handle his productions he started Laurence Olivier Productions.

== Productions ==
Year(s)	Title	Role
1957	The Prince and the Showgirl	Production company
Feb 13, 1952 – Apr 26, 1952	Venus Observed	"Produced by arrangement with …"
Dec 20, 1951 – Apr 13, 1952	Antony and Cleopatra	"Produced by arrangement with …"
Dec 19, 1951 – Apr 12, 1952	Caesar and Cleopatra	"Produced by arrangement with …"

== Sources ==
- Beckett, Francis (2005). Laurence Olivier. Life & Times. Haus Publishing. ISBN 9781904950387.
- "Laurence Olivier Productions". British Film Institute. n.d.
- "Laurence Olivier Productions, Ltd". Internet Broadway Database. n.d.
- "Laurence Olivier Productions, Ltd". Playbill.com. n.d.
