= List of awards and nominations received by Laurence Olivier =

Laurence Olivier awards and nominations
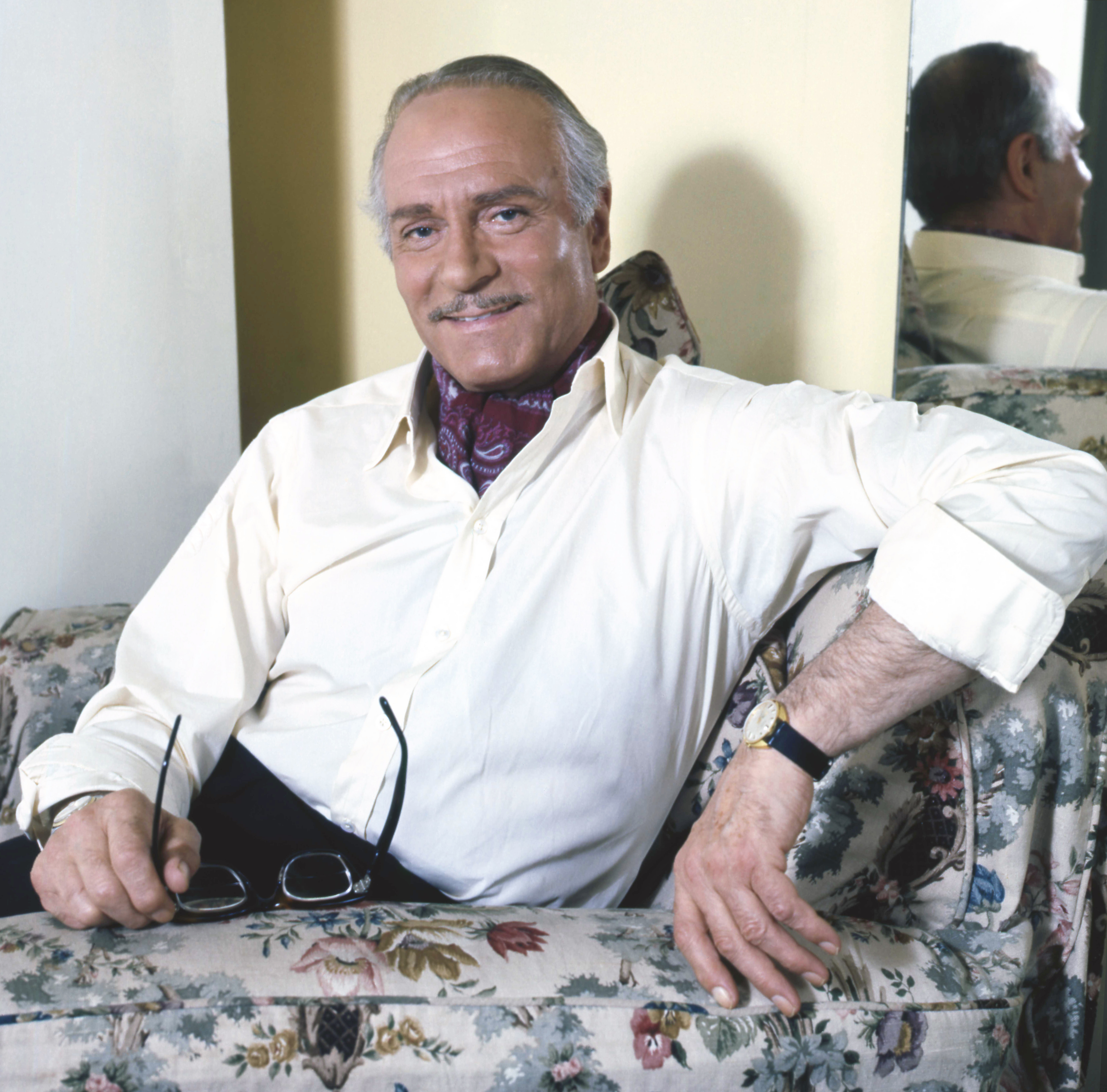
- Olivier during the production of Sleuth in 1972
Awards and nominations
Award	Wins	Nominations
Academy Awards	2	12
BAFTA Film Awards	3	9
Golden Globe Awards	3	6
BAFTA TV Awards	0	2
Evening Standard Theatre Awards	3	3
Emmy Awards	5	9
Tony Awards	0	1

Laurence Olivier (1907–1989) was an English actor and director who, along with his contemporaries Ralph Richardson, John Gielgud and Michael Redgrave, dominated the British stage of the mid-20th century. He also worked in films throughout his six-decade career, playing more than fifty cinema roles. From 1956 he performed in television roles, for which he won several awards.

In 1939 Olivier appeared in the film Wuthering Heights in the quintessential role of Heathcliff, which garnered him his first nomination for the Academy Award for Best Actor. The following year, he was again nominated for the same award for his portrayal of Maxim de Winter in Rebecca. In 1944, he produced, directed, and appeared as King Henry V of England in Henry V. The film was nominated for several Academy Awards, including Best Picture and Best Actor, although it failed to win in any competitive category; instead Olivier received a "Special Award" for his work on the film. His next film, Hamlet (1948), became the first non-American film to win the Academy Award for Best Picture, and he also received the award for Best Actor. (Note: The film also won Academy Awards for Best Art Direction and Best Costume Design, and was nominated for awards for Best Supporting Actress (Jean Simmons as Ophelia), Best Score and Olivier as Best Director.) In 1979 Olivier was presented with an Academy Honorary Award to recognise his lifetime of contribution to the art of film. In total, he was nominated for nine other acting Academy Awards, plus one for the direction of Hamlet. For his stage work, Olivier won three Evening Standard Theatre Awards and was nominated for a Tony Award. He made his television debut in 1956 and was subsequently nominated nine times for an Emmy Award, winning on five occasions; he was also nominated for two British Academy Television Awards for his work in the medium.

In 1947 Olivier was appointed a Knight Bachelor, and in 1970 he was given a life peerage; the Order of Merit was conferred on him in 1981. He also received honours from foreign governments. In 1949 he was made Commander of the Order of the Dannebrog by the Danish government; the French appointed him Officier, Legion of Honour, in 1953; the Italian government created him Sardinian Grande Ufficiale, Order of Merit of the Italian Republic, in 1953; and in 1971 he was granted the Order of Yugoslav Flag with Golden Wreath.

From academic and other institutions, Olivier received honorary doctorates from the university of Tufts, Massachusetts (1946), Oxford (1957) and Edinburgh (1964). He was also awarded the Danish Sonning Prize for outstanding contributions to European culture in 1966, the Gold Medallion of the Royal Swedish Academy of Letters, History and Antiquities in 1968; and the Albert Medal of the Royal Society of Arts in 1976. (Note: Olivier was also offered an honorary degree from Yale University, but was unable to receive it.) In February 1960 for his contribution to the film industry, Olivier was inducted into the Hollywood Walk of Fame, with a star at 6319 Hollywood Boulevard; he is also included in the American Theater Hall of Fame. In 1977 Olivier was awarded a British Film Institute Fellowship.

In addition to the naming of the National Theatre's largest auditorium in his honour, Olivier is commemorated in the Laurence Olivier Awards, bestowed annually since 1984 by the Society of London Theatre. In 1991 Olivier's friend, the actor Gielgud, unveiled a memorial stone commemorating Olivier in Poets' Corner at Westminster Abbey. In 2007, the centenary of Olivier's birth, a life-sized statue of him was unveiled on the South Bank, outside the National Theatre; the same year the British Film Institute held a retrospective season of his film work.

== Film ==
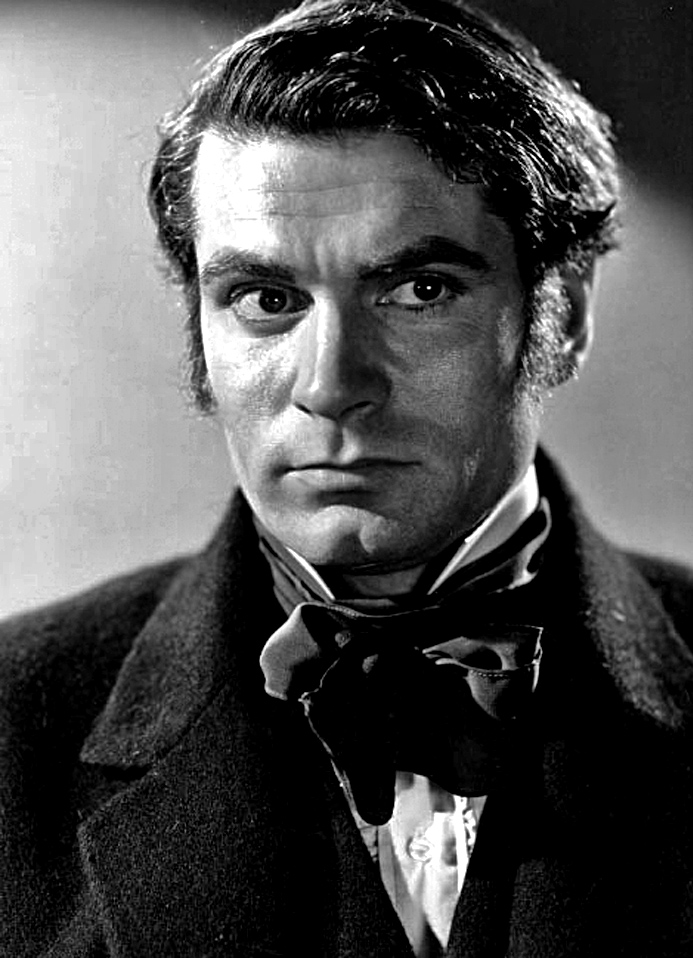
Publicity still of Olivier for the 1939 film Wuthering Heights

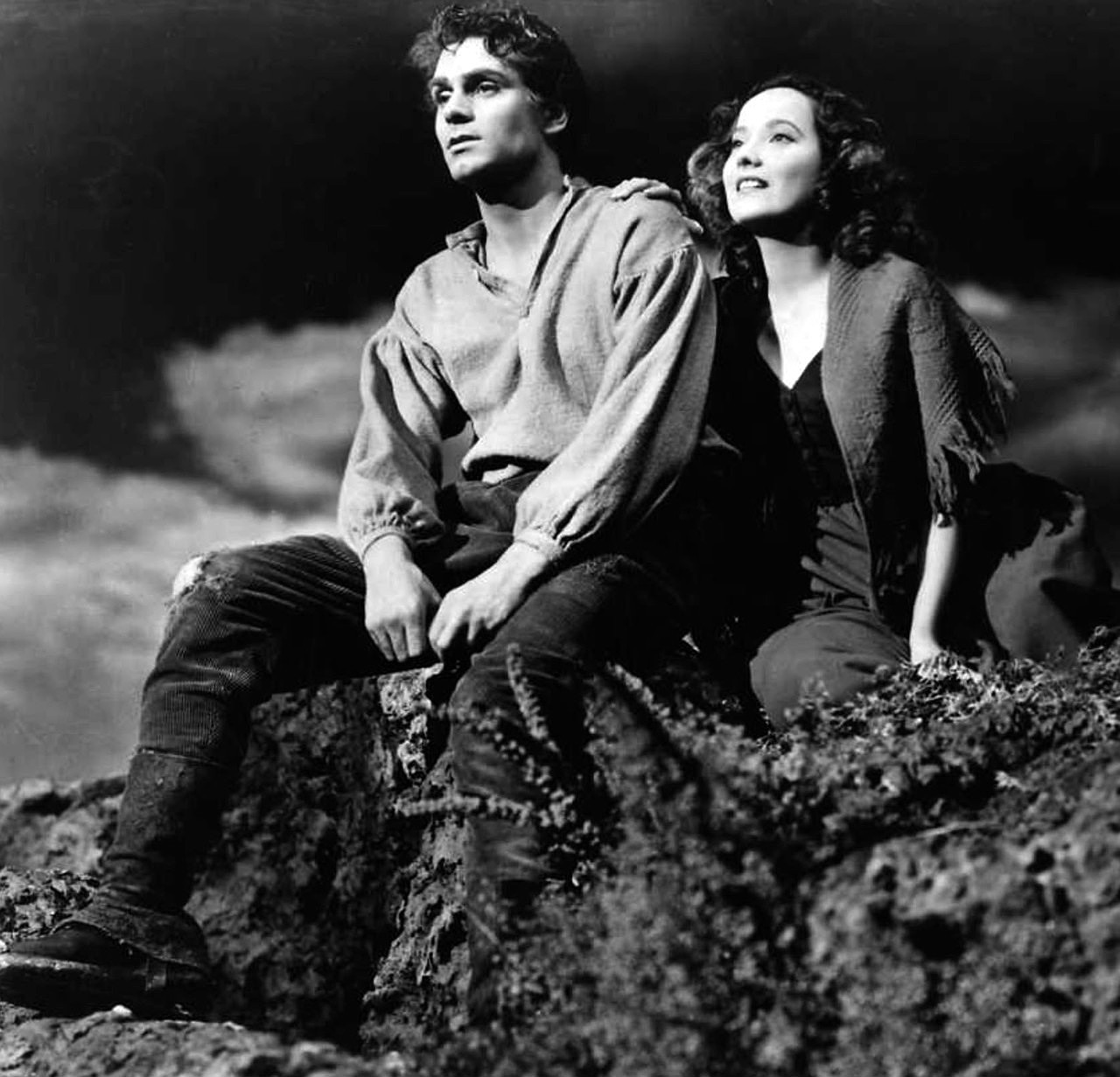
Olivier, with Merle Oberon in Wuthering Heights

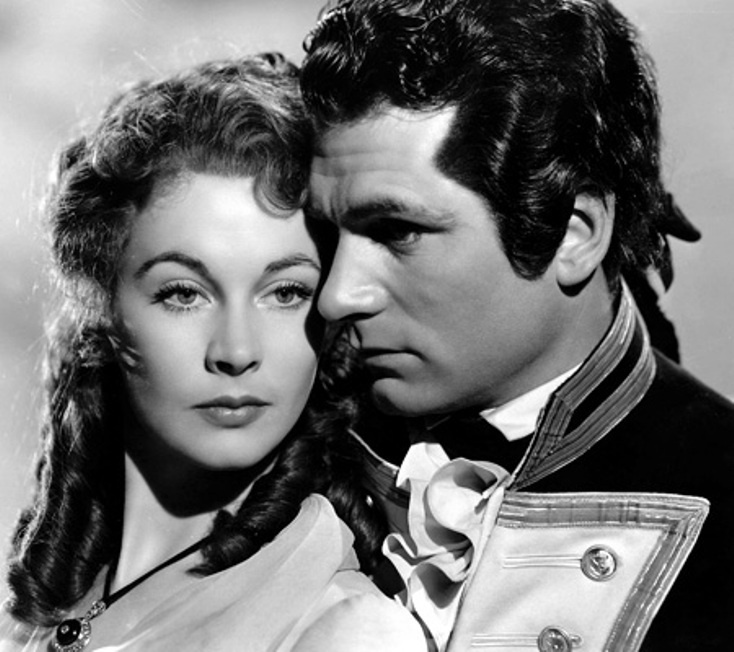
Publicity still of Olivier and Vivien Leigh from the 1941 film That Hamilton Woman

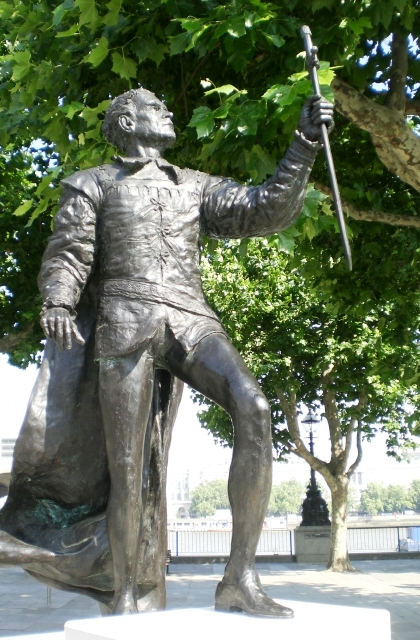
Statue of Olivier outside the Royal National Theatre, London

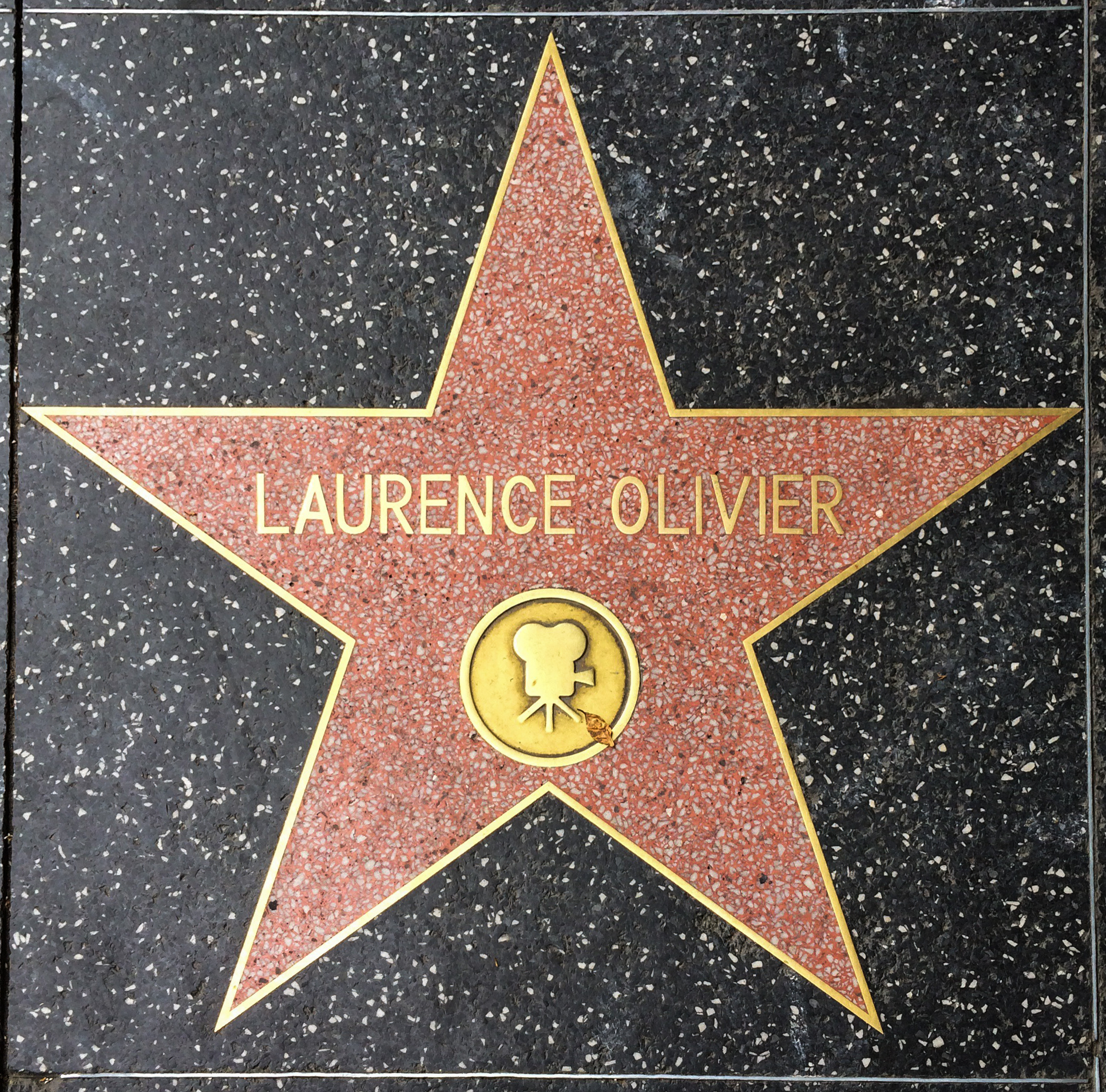
Olivier's star on the Hollywood Walk of Fame

Awards and nominations for Olivier's film work
Film	Year	Award	Category	Result	Ref.
Wuthering Heights	1940	Academy Award	Best Actor	Nominated	
Rebecca	1941	Academy Award	Best Actor	Nominated	
Henry V	1946	National Board of Review Award	Best Actor	Won	
Henry V	1946	New York Film Critics Circle Award	Best Actor	Won	
Henry V	1947	Academy Award	Best Actor	Nominated	
Henry V	1947	Academy Honorary Award	Honorary award: "To Laurence Olivier for his outstanding achievement as actor, producer and director in bringing Henry V to the screen"	Recipient	
Hamlet	1948	Venice Film Festival	Grand International Prize of Venice (Best Film)	Won	
Hamlet	1948	New York Film Critics Circle Award	Best Actor	Won	
Hamlet	1949	Golden Globe Award	Best Actor – Motion Picture Drama	Won	
Hamlet	1949	Academy Award	Best Actor	Won	
Hamlet	1949	Academy Award	Best Directing	Nominated	
Hamlet	1949	Bodil Awards	Best European Film	Won	
Henry V	1950	Italian National Syndicate of Film Journalists	Nastro d'Argento for Best Director (Silver Ribbon)	Nominated	
Carrie	1953	British Academy Film Award	Best British Actor	Nominated	
Richard III	1956	British Academy Film Award	Best Actor in a Leading Role	Won	
Richard III	1956	6th Berlin International Film Festival	Silver Bear International Prize	Won	
Richard III	1957	Academy Award	Best Actor	Nominated	
Richard III	1957	David di Donatello Awards	Best Foreign Actor	Won	
Richard III	1957	David di Donatello Awards	Best Foreign Producer	Won	
Richard III	1957	Jussi Awards	Best Foreign Actor	Won	
The Prince and the Showgirl	1958	British Academy Film Award	Best British Actor	Nominated	
The Devil's Disciple	1960	British Academy Film Award	Best British Actor	Nominated	
The Entertainer	1960	Karlovy Vary International Film Festival	Best Actor	Won	
Spartacus	1961	Golden Globe Award	Best Actor – Motion Picture Drama	Nominated	
The Entertainer	1961	British Academy Film Award	Best British Actor	Nominated	
The Entertainer	1961	Academy Award	Best Actor	Nominated	
Term of Trial	1963	British Academy Film Award	Best British Actor	Nominated	
Othello	1966	Academy Award	Best Actor	Nominated	
Othello	1967	National Society of Film Critics	Best Actor	Nominated	
Oh! What a Lovely War	1970	British Academy Film Award	Best Actor in a Supporting Role	Won	
Sleuth	1973	New York Film Critics Circle Award	Best Actor	Won	
Sleuth	1973	Golden Globe Award	Best Actor – Motion Picture Drama	Nominated	
Sleuth	1973	Academy Award	Best Actor	Nominated	
Sleuth	1973	David di Donatello Awards	Best Foreign Actor	Won	
Sleuth	1974	British Academy Film Award	Best Actor	Nominated	
–	1976	British Academy Film Award	Academy Fellowship Award	Recipient	
Marathon Man	1977	Golden Globe Award	Best Supporting Actor – Motion Picture	Won	
Marathon Man	1977	Academy Award	Best Supporting Actor	Nominated	
The Boys from Brazil	1978	National Board of Review Award	Best Actor (Note: Tied with Jon Voight for Coming Home)	Won	
The Boys from Brazil	1979	Saturn Award	Best Actor	Won	
The Boys from Brazil	1979	Academy Award	Best Actor	Nominated	
–	1979	Academy Honorary Award	Honorary award: "To Laurence Olivier for the full body of his work, for the unique achievements of his entire career and his lifetime of contribution to the art of film."	Recipient	
–	1979	Filmex Trustees Award	Filmex Trustees Award: "Laurence Olivier was given the Filmex Trustees Award to honor his monumental lifetime contributions to the "art form of the century"	Recipient	
A Little Romance	1980	Golden Globe Award	Best Supporting Actor – Motion Picture	Nominated	
The Jazz Singer	1981	Golden Raspberry Award	Worst Supporting Actor	Won	
Inchon	1983	Golden Raspberry Award	Worst Actor	Won	
–	1983	Golden Globe Award	Cecil B. DeMille Award	Recipient	
–	1983	Film Society of Lincoln Center	Gala Tribute	Honored	

== Stage ==
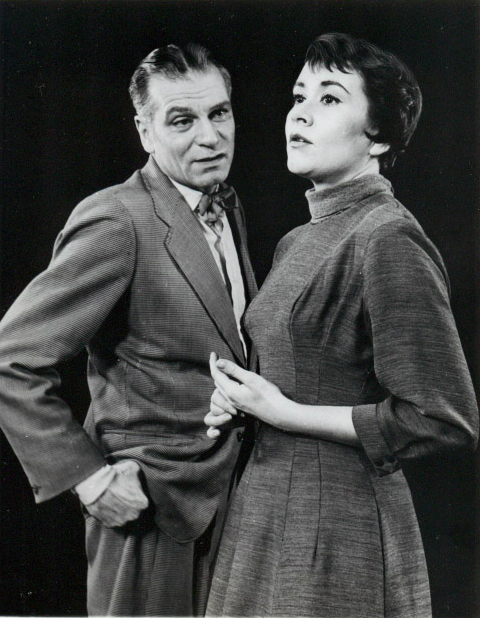
Olivier, with Joan Plowright in The Entertainer on Broadway in 1958

Awards and nominations for Olivier's stage work
Show	Year	Award	Category	Result	Ref.
The Entertainer	1957	Evening Standard Theatre Awards	Best Actor	Won	
The Entertainer	1958	Tony Award	Best Actor in a Play	Nominated	
The Dance of Death	1967	Evening Standard Theatre Awards	Best Actor	Won	
Long Day's Journey into Night	1972	Evening Standard Theatre Awards	Best Actor	Won	
—N/a	1979	Society of West End Theatre Awards	Society Special Award	Recipient	

== Television ==
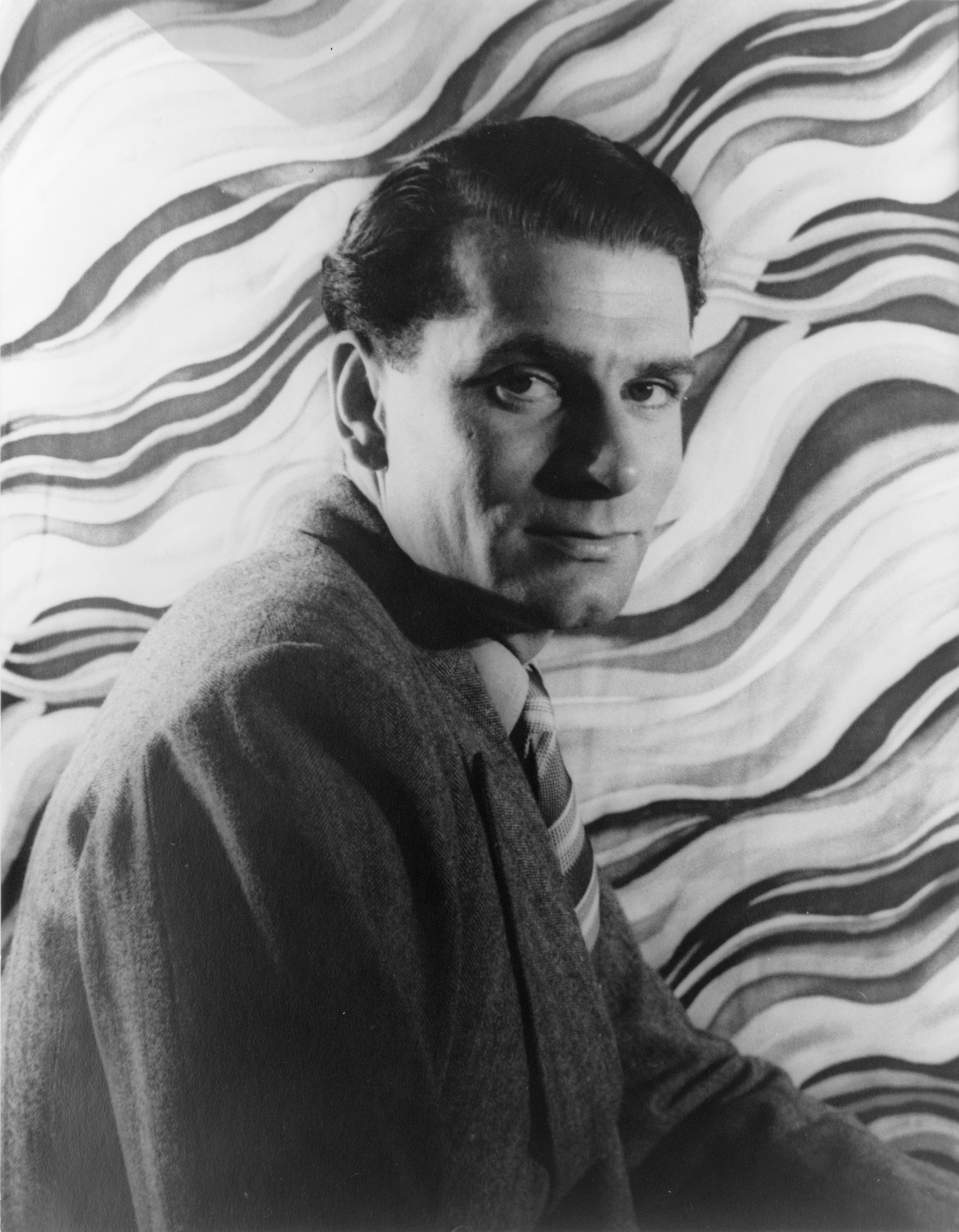
Olivier in 1939

Awards and nominations for Olivier's television work
Show	Year	Award	Category	Result	Ref.
The Moon and the Sixpence	1960	Emmy Award	Outstanding Lead Actor – Miniseries or a Movie	Won	
Uncle Vanya	1968	Emmy Award	Outstanding Drama Series	Nominated	
David Copperfield	1970	Emmy Award	Outstanding Lead Actor – Miniseries or a Movie	Nominated	
Long Day's Journey into Night	1973	Emmy Award	Outstanding Lead Actor – Miniseries or a Movie	Won	
Long Day's Journey into Night	1973	British Academy Television Award	Best Television Actor	Nominated	
The Merchant of Venice	1974	Emmy Award	Outstanding Lead Actor – Miniseries or a Movie	Nominated	
Love Among the Ruins	1975	Emmy Award	Outstanding Lead Actor – Miniseries or a Movie	Won	
Brideshead Revisited	1982	Emmy Award	Outstanding Supporting Actor – Miniseries or a Movie	Won	
A Voyage Round My Father	1983	British Academy Television Award	Best Television Actor	Nominated	
King Lear	1984	Emmy Award	Outstanding Lead Actor – Miniseries or a Movie	Won	
Mr. Halpern and Mr. Johnson	1984	CableACE Award	Best Actor	Won	
–	1985	Banff Television Festival	Lifetime Achievement Award	Recipient	
Lost Empires	1987	Emmy Award	Outstanding Supporting Actor – Miniseries or a Movie	Nominated	

== State and academic honours ==
State and academic honours for Olivier's
Award	Year	Country or institution
Honorary doctorate	1946	Tufts University
Honorary doctorate	1946	University of Massachusetts
Knight Bachelor	1947	UK
Commander of the Order of the Dannebrog	1949	Denmark
Officier, Legion of Honour	1953	France
Grande Ufficiale, Order of Merit of the Italian Republic	1953	Italy
Honorary doctorate	1957	University of Oxford
Honorary doctorate	1964	University of Edinburgh
Sonning Prize	1966	Denmark
Honorary doctorate	1968	University of London
Honorary doctorate	1968	Victoria University of Manchester
Gold Medallion	1968	Royal Swedish Academy of Letters, History and Antiquities, Sweden
Life peerage	1970	UK
Order of Yugoslav Flag with Golden Wreath	1971	Yugoslavia
Albert Medal	1976	Royal Society of Arts, UK
Order of Merit	1981	UK

== See also ==
- Laurence Olivier on stage and screen

== Notes and references ==
=== Sources ===
- Billington, Michael (2004). "Olivier, Laurence Kerr, Baron Olivier (1907–1989)". Oxford Dictionary of National Biography (online ed.). Oxford University Press. doi:10.1093/ref:odnb/38623. (Subscription, Wikipedia Library access or UK public library membership required.)
- Coleman, Terry (2006). Olivier: The Authorised Biography. London: Bloomsbury. ISBN 978-0-7475-8080-5.
- Gielgud, John (2004). Mangan, Richard (ed.). Gielgud's Letters. London: Weidenfeld and Nicolson. ISBN 978-0-297-82989-8.
- Herbert, Ian (1978). Who's Who in the Theatre: a Biographical Record of the Contemporary Stage. London: Pitman Publishing. ISBN 978-0-2730-1195-8.
- Munn, Michael (2007). Lord Larry: The Secret Life of Laurence Olivier: a Personal and Intimate Portrait. London: Robson Books. ISBN 978-1-86105-977-2.
- Shail, Robert (2007). British Film Directors: A Critical Guide. Carbondale: Southern Illinois University Press. ISBN 978-0-8093-2833-8.
- Tanitch, Robert (1985). Olivier. London: Thames & Hudson. ISBN 978-0-5000-1363-2.
