= Laurence Olivier on stage and screen =

Overview of the actor's professional life

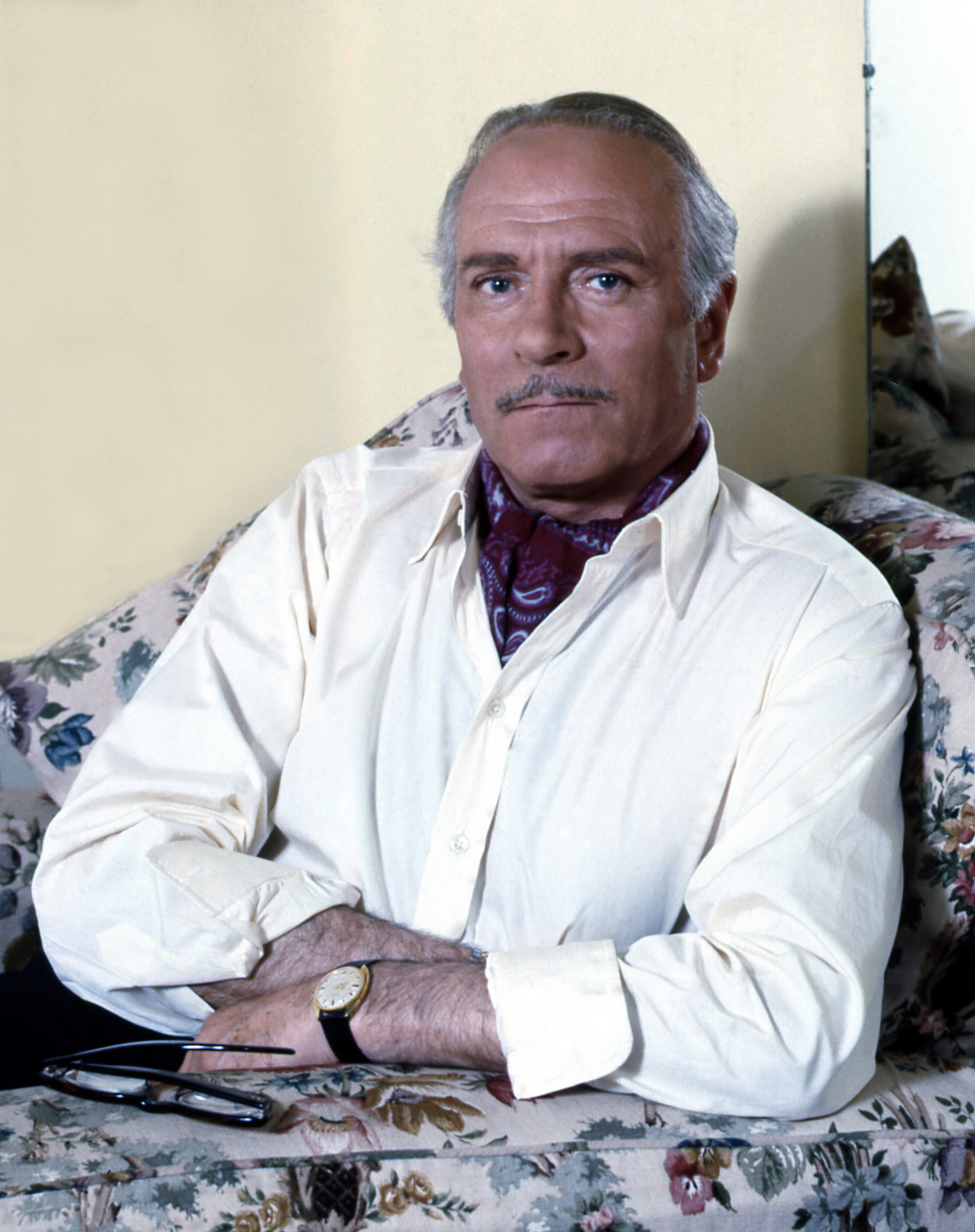
Olivier during the production of Sleuth in 1972

Laurence Olivier (1907–1989) was an English actor and director who, along with his contemporaries Ralph Richardson, John Gielgud and Michael Redgrave, dominated the British stage of the mid-20th century. He also worked in films throughout his six-decade career, playing more than fifty cinema roles. From 1955, Olivier also performed in radio broadcasts and, from 1956, had considerable success in television roles.

After attending drama school, Olivier began his professional career with small touring companies before being taken on in 1925 by Sybil Thorndike and her husband, Lewis Casson, as a bit-part player, understudy and assistant stage manager for their London company. In 1926 he joined the Birmingham Repertory Company, where he was given the chance to play a wide range of key roles. In 1930 he had his first important West End success in Noël Coward's Private Lives, and in 1935 he played in a celebrated production of Romeo and Juliet alongside Gielgud and Peggy Ashcroft, and by the end of the decade he was an established star. In the 1940s, together with Richardson and John Burrell, Olivier was the co-director of the Old Vic, building it into a highly respected company. There his most celebrated roles included Shakespeare's Richard III and Sophocles's Oedipus. In the 1950s Olivier was an independent actor-manager, but his stage career was in the doldrums until he joined the avant garde English Stage Company in 1957 to play the title role in The Entertainer. From 1963 to 1973 he was the founding director of Britain's National Theatre, running a resident company that fostered many future stars. His own parts there included the title role in Othello (1964) and Shylock in The Merchant of Venice (1970).

In 1930, to gain money for his forthcoming marriage, Olivier began his film career with small roles in two films. In 1939 he appeared as Heathcliff in Wuthering Heights in a role that saw him nominated for the Academy Award for Best Actor. The following year he was again nominated for the same award for his portrayal of Maxim de Winter in Rebecca. In 1944 he produced, directed and appeared as Henry V of England in Henry V. There were Oscar nominations for the film, including Best Picture and Best Actor, but it won none and the film instead won a "Special Award". He won the Best Actor award for the 1948 film Hamlet, which became the first non-American film to win the Academy Award for Best Picture. (Note: The film also won Oscars for Best Art Direction and Best Costume Design, and was nominated for awards for Best Actress (Jean Simmons as Ophelia), Best Score and Olivier as Best Director.) He later received Oscar nominations for roles in Richard III (1955), The Entertainer (1960), Othello (1965), Sleuth (1972), Marathon Man (1976) and The Boys from Brazil (1978). In 1979 he was also presented with an Honorary Award, at the Academy Awards, to recognise his lifetime of contribution to the art of film. He was nominated for nine other acting Oscars and one each for production and direction. Throughout his career Olivier appeared in radio dramas and poetry readings, and made his television debut in 1956.

After being ill for the last twenty-two years of his life, Olivier died of kidney failure at the age of 82 on 11 July 1989. Reflecting on Olivier's pioneering of Britain's National Theatre, the broadcaster Melvyn Bragg wrote: "[N]o one doubts that the National is perhaps his most enduring monument". Olivier's claim to theatrical greatness lay not only in his acting, but by being, in the words of the English theatre director Peter Hall, "the supreme man of the theatre of our time".

== Theatre ==
=== As actor ===
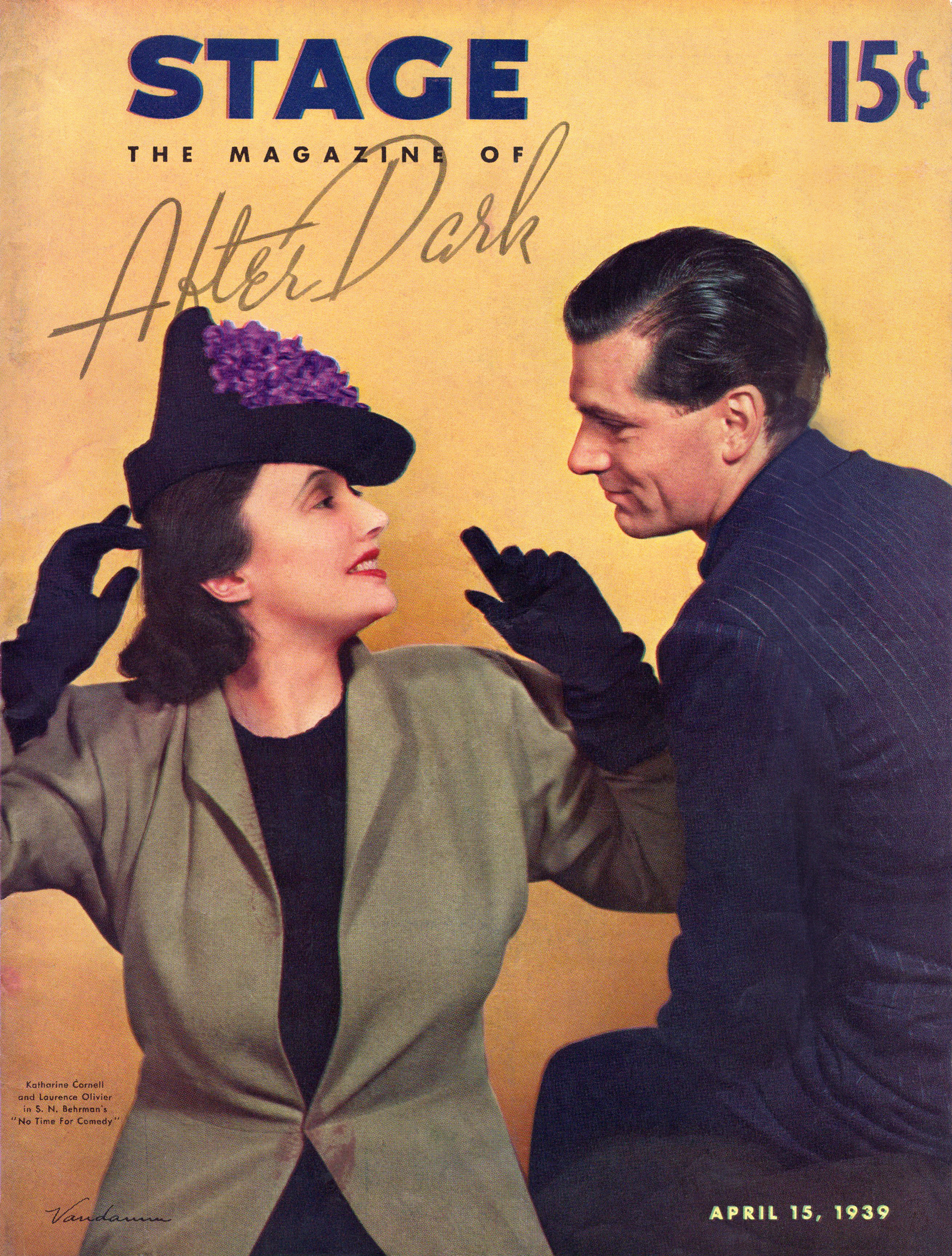
Katharine Cornell and Olivier in the Broadway production of No Time for Comedy, on the cover of Stage magazine (April 15, 1939)

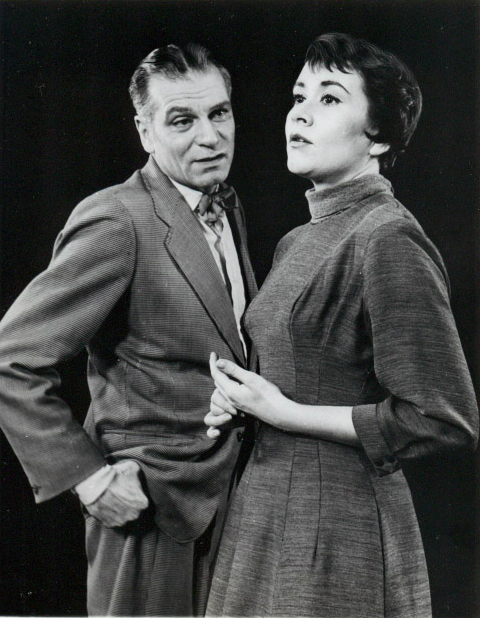
Olivier with Joan Plowright in The Entertainer on Broadway in 1958

This table contains Olivier's known professional theatrical roles. It also contains the occasions when he both acted and directed. It does not contain those productions where he was a director but did not appear on stage. It also omits the amateur productions in which he performed at school, mostly Shakespeare, playing, among other roles, Brutus, Puck and also female roles, including Katherina in The Taming of the Shrew.

Stage credits of Olivier
Production	Date	Role	Theatre (London, unless otherwise noted)	Number of performances
Unfailing Instinct	August 1925	Armand St Cyr	Brighton Hippodrome and tour	
The Ghost Train	August 1925	Policeman	Brighton Hippodrome and tour	
The Tempest	October 1925	Antonio	Century Theatre and London area tour	
Julius Caesar	October 1925	Flavius	Century Theatre and London area tour	
Henry VIII	23 December 1925 – 20 March 1926	First Serving Man	Empire Theatre	127
Oedipus Tyrannus	10 January 1926	Suppliant, Guard and Servant	New Scala Theatre	1
The Cenci	8–19 March 1926	Servant to Orsino	Empire Theatre	4
The Marvellous History of Saint Bernard	7 April – 12 June 1926	Minstrel	Kingsway Theatre	76
The Merchant of Venice	23 April 1926	Gentleman	Theatre Royal, Haymarket	1
The Song	3 May 1926	Lucio de Costanza	Royal Court Theatre	1
The Barber and the Cow	June 1926	Minor role	Clacton	
The Farmer's Wife	July–November 1926	Richard Coaker	Tour	
The Farmer's Wife	December 1926	Richard Coaker	Birmingham Repertory Theatre	
Something to Talk About	31 January 1927	Guy Sidney	Birmingham Repertory Theatre	
Well of the Saints	31 January 1927	Mat Simon	Birmingham Repertory Theatre	
The Third Finger	12 February 1927	Tom Hardcastle	Birmingham Repertory Theatre	
The Mannoch Family	26 February 1927	Peter Mannoch	Birmingham Repertory Theatre	
The Comedian	19 March 1927	Walk on parts	Birmingham Repertory Theatre	
Uncle Vanya	2 April 1927	Vanya	Birmingham Repertory Theatre	
All's Well That Ends Well	16 April 1927	Parolles	Birmingham Repertory Theatre	
The Pleasure Garden	30 April 1927	Young Man	Birmingham Repertory Theatre	
She Stoops to Conquer	14 May 1927	Tony Lumpkin	Birmingham Repertory Theatre	
Quality Street	4 June 1927	Ensign Blades	Birmingham Repertory Theatre	
Bird in Hand	3 September 1927	Gerald Arnwood	Birmingham Repertory Theatre	
Advertising April	24 September 1927	Mervyn Jones	Birmingham Repertory Theatre	
The Adding Machine	2 October 1927	Young Man	Birmingham Repertory Theatre	
The Silver Box	8 October 1927	Jack Barthwick	Birmingham Repertory Theatre	
Aren't Women Wonderful	November 1927	Mr Milford	Birmingham Repertory Theatre	
The Road to Ruin	5 November 1927	Mr Milford	Birmingham Repertory Theatre	
The Adding Machine	9 January – 4 February 1928	Young Man	Royal Court Theatre	32
Macbeth	6–13 March 1928	Malcolm	Royal Court Theatre	32
Back to Methuselah	19–31 March 1928	Martellus	Royal Court Theatre	11
Harold	2–24 April 1928	Harold	Royal Court Theatre	25
The Taming of the Shrew	30 April – 26 May 1928	Lord	Royal Court Theatre	32
Bird in Hand	1 June 1928	Gerald Arnwood	Royalty Theatre	
Paul Among the Jews (Paulus unter den Juden)	8–9 July 1928	Chanan	Prince of Wales Theatre	2
The Dark Path	4 November 1928	Graham Birley	Royalty Theatre	1
Journey's End	9–10 December 1928	Captain Stanhope	Apollo Theatre	2
Beau Geste	30 January – 4 March 1929	Beau Geste	His Majesty's Theatre	39
Prize Giving at Woodside House School (sketch)	17 February 1929	McTavish VI	Queen's Theatre	1
The Circle of Chalk	14 March – 20 April 1929	Prince Pao	New Theatre	48
Paris Bound	22–27 April 1929	Richard Parish	Golders Green Hippodrome	8
Paris Bound	30 April – 25 May 1929	Richard Parish	Lyric Theatre	31
The Stranger Within	June 1929	John Hardy	Garrick Theatre	53
The Stranger Within	5–10 August 1929	John Hardy	Golders Green Hippodrome	8
Murder on the Second Floor	September 1929	Hugh Bromilow	Eltinge 42nd Street Theatre, New York	
The Last Enemy	December 1929	Jerry Warrender	Fortune Theatre	97
100 Not Out (sketch)	23 February 1930	Helen the nurse	Queen's Theatre	1
After All	30 March – 6 April 1930	Ralph	Arts Theatre	9
Private Lives	18 August – 20 September 1930	Victor Prynne	On tour: Edinburgh, Birmingham, Manchester and Southsea	32
Private Lives	24 September – 20 December 1930	Victor Prynne	Phoenix Theatre	101
Some Other Private Lives (sketch)	8 December 1930	Alf	Hippodrome	1
Private Lives	27 January 1931	Victor Prynne	Times Square Theatre, New York	150
The Rats of Norway	6 April – 8 July 1933	Steven Beringer	Playhouse Theatre	107
The Green Bay Tree	20 October 1933	Julian Dulcimer	Cort Theatre, New York	116
Biography	25 April – 2 June 1934	Richard Kurt	Globe Theatre	45
Queen of Scots	8 June – 8 September 1934	Bothwell	New Theatre	106
Theatre Royal	1–20 October 1934	Anthony Cavendish	On tour: Glasgow, Edinburgh and Manchester	24
Theatre Royal	23 October – 23 December 1934	Anthony Cavendish	Lyric Theatre	
Journey's End	12 November 1934	Captain Stanhope	Adelphi Theatre	1
A Kiss for Cinderella	22 November 1934	Policeman Prince	His Majesty's Theatre	1
November Afternoon (sketch)	2 December 1934	Man	Comedy Theatre	1
The Winning Post	17 December 1934	Philip Cavanagh	Adelphi Theatre	1
Ringmaster	25 February – 22 March 1935	Peter Hammond	Tour: Oxford and Birmingham	15
Ringmaster	1935	Peter Hammond	Shaftesbury Theatre	8
November Afternoon (sketch)	15 March 1935	Man	Hippodrome	1
Notices (sketch)	7 April 1935	Oswald Parkinsion	Comedy Theatre	1
The Down and Outs Matinee	8 April 1935	Reader	Gaiety Theatre	1
Golden Arrow	13–18 May 1935	Richard Harben; Also director	New Theatre, Oxford	7
Golden Arrow	30 May – 15 June 1935	Richard Harben; Also director	Whitehall Theatre	19
The Massed Chorus	10 June 1935	Footman	Grosvenor House	1
Romeo and Juliet	16 October 1935 – 28 March 1936	Romeo and Mercutio	New Theatre	186
Bees on the Boat Deck	5 May – 6 June 1936	Robert Patch (Note: Also co-director with Ralph Richardson)	Lyric Theatre	37
Hamlet	5 January – 20 February 1937	Hamlet	The Old Vic	42
Twelfth Night	23 February – 3 April 1937	Sir Toby Belch	The Old Vic	42
Henry V	6 April – 22 May 1937	Henry V	The Old Vic	50
Shakespeare Birthday Festival	1937	Romeo and Henry V	The Old Vic	1
Midnight with the Stars	6 May 1937	Personal appearance	Empire Theatre	1
Hamlet	2–6 June 1937	Hamlet	Elsinore, Denmark	5
Macbeth	26 November 1937 – 15 January 1938	Macbeth	The Old Vic then New Theatre	55
Othello	8 February – 12 March 1938	Iago	The Old Vic	35
The King of Nowhere	15 March – 16 April 1938	Vivaldi	The Old Vic	34
Coriolanus	19 April – 21 May 1938	Coriolanus	The Old Vic	35
Here's to Our Enterprise	23 May 1938	Alfred Jingle	Lyceum Theatre	1
No Time for Comedy	17 April 1939	Gaylord Easterbrook	Ethel Barrymore Theatre, New York	72
Romeo and Juliet	9 May – June 1940	Romeo; Also director	51st Street Theatre, New York	36
All Star Concert in aid of the Russian Relief Fund (scene from Romeo and Juliet)	7 December 1941	Romeo	Empire Theatre, York	1
Esmond Knight Matinée (scene from Henry V)	18 January 1942	Henry V	London Palladium	1
Elsie Fogerty Jubilee Matinée	30 November 1942	Poetry reader	New Theatre	1
Arms and the Man	7–12 August 1944	Sergius Saranoff	Opera House, Manchester	9
Peer Gynt	31 August 1944 – 14 April 1945	The Button Moulder	New Theatre	83
Arms and the Man	5 September 1944 – 13 April 1945	Sergius Saranoff	New Theatre	67
Richard III	13 September 1944 –11 April 1945	Richard III	New Theatre	83
Uncle Vanya	16 January – 12 April 1945	Dr Astrov	New Theatre	25
Arms and the Man	June 1945	Sergius Saranoff	ENSA Garrison Theatre, Antwerp	
Richard III	June 1945	Richard III	ENSA Garrison Theatre, Antwerp	
Henry IV, Part 1	26 September 1945 – 13 April 1946	Hotspur	New Theatre	69
Henry IV, Part 2	3 October 1945 – 13 April 1946	Justice Shallow	New Theatre	59
Oedipus and The Critic	18 October 1945 – 27 April 1946	Oedipus and Mr Puff	New Theatre	76
Uncle Vanya	1 May – 14 June 1946	Dr Astrov	New Century Theatre, New York	8
Henry IV, Part 1	6 May – 13 June 1946	Hotspur	New Century Theatre, New York	18
Henry IV, Part 2	6 May – 13 June 1946	Justice Shallow	New Century Theatre, New York	9
Oedipus and The Critic	20 May – 15 June 1946	Oedipus and Mr Puff	New Century Theatre, New York	15
King Lear	24 September 1946 – 4 January 1947	Lear	New Theatre	42
King Lear	25 November – 1 December 1946	Lear	Théâtre des Champs-Élysées, Paris	7
The School for Scandal	20 – 30 March 1948	Sir Peter Teazle; Also director	Capitol Theatre, Perth	
Richard III	3 – 17 April 1948	Richard III	Theatre Royal, Adelaide	
The Skin of Our Teeth	12 – 17 April 1948	Mr Antrobus; Also director	Theatre Royal, Adelaide	
The School for Scandal Richard III The Skin of Our Teeth	19 April – 12 June 1948	Sir Peter Teazle; Richard III; Mr Antrobus	Princess Theatre Melbourne	
The School for Scandal	15 – 19 June 1948	Sir Peter Teazle	Theatre Royal, Hobart	
The School for Scandal Richard III The Skin of Our Teeth	29 June – August 1948	Sir Peter Teazle; Richard III; Mr Antrobus	New Tivoli Theatre, Sydney	
The School for Scandal	August – September 1948	Sir Peter Teazle	His Majesty's Theatre, Brisbane	
The School for Scandal	September 1948	Sir Peter Teazle	St. James Theatre, Auckland	
The School for Scandal	September 1948	Sir Peter Teazle	St. James Theatre, Christchurch	
The School for Scandal	September 1948	Sir Peter Teazle	His Majesty's Theatre, Dunedin	
The School for Scandal	October 1948	Sir Peter Teazle	St. James Theatre, Wellington	
The School for Scandal	20 January – 4 June 1949	Sir Peter Teazle; Also director	New Theatre	74
Richard III	26 January – 2 June 1949	Richard III	New Theatre	35
Antigone	2 February – 1 June 1949	Chorus	New Theatre	39
RADA Cabaret	30 March 1949	Personal appearance	Lyceum Theatre	1
Venus Observed	18 January – 5 August 1950	The Duke of Altair; Also director	St James's Theatre	229
Caesar and Cleopatra	24 – 28 April 1951	Julius Caesar	Opera House, Manchester	7
Antony and Cleopatra	1 – 6 May 1951	Mark Antony	Opera House, Manchester	7
Caesar and Cleopatra	10 May – 21 September 1951	Julius Caesar	St James's Theatre	77
Antony and Cleopatra	11 May – 22 September 1951	Mark Antony	St James's Theatre	76
The Sid Field Tribute	25 June 1951	Appearance	London Palladium	1
Caesar and Cleopatra	13 November–17 November 1951	Julius Caesar	Royal Court Theatre, Liverpool	7
Antony and Cleopatra	20–24 November 1951	Mark Antony	Royal Court Theatre, Liverpool	7
Caesar and Cleopatra	19 December 1951 – 11 April 1952	Julius Caesar	Ziegfeld Theatre, New York	67
Antony and Cleopatra	20 December 1951 – 12 April 1952	Mark Antony	Ziegfeld Theatre, New York	66
The Sleeping Prince	28 September – 24 October 1953	Grand Duke of Carpathia; Also director	Tour: Manchester, Glasgow, Edinburgh and Newcastle	32
The Sleeping Prince	5 November 1953 – 3 July 1954	Grand Duke of Carpathia; Also director	Phoenix Theatre	274
Midnight Cavalcade	18 March 1954	Appeared with Jack Buchanan	London Palladium	1
All Star RADA Jubilee Matinée: Henry VIII	31 March 1954	Reader, Epilogue only	Her Majesty's Theatre	1
Night of a Hundred Stars	24 June 1954	Appeared with Jack Buchanan	London Palladium	1
Twelfth Night	12 April – 26 November 1955	Malvolio	Royal Shakespeare Theatre, Stratford-upon-Avon	81
Macbeth	7 June – 23 November 1955	Macbeth	Royal Shakespeare Theatre, Stratford-upon-Avon	56
Titus Andronicus	16 August – 25 November 1955	Titus Andronicus	Royal Shakespeare Theatre, Stratford-upon-Avon	29
Green Room Cavalcade	5 March 1956	Sir Peter Teazle	London Coliseum	1
Night of 100 Stars	28 June 1956	Evening host and Performer in White Tie and Tails	London Palladium	1
Central School Jubilee	25 November 1956	Edwardian soirée guest	Saville Theatre	1
Evening for Hungary Relief	18 December 1956	Speaker	Royal Festival Hall	1
The Entertainer	10 April – 11 May 1957	Archie Rice	Royal Court Theatre	36
Titus Andronicus	15 May 1957 – 21 June 1957	Titus Andronicus	Tour: Paris, Venice, Belgrade, Zagreb, Vienna and Warsaw	26
Titus Andronicus	1 July – 3 August 1957	Titus Andronicus	Stoll Theatre	35
Son et Lumière	6 August 1957	Duke of Gloucester	Greenwich Royal Naval College	1
The Entertainer	10 September 1957 – 18 January 1958	Archie Rice	Palace Theatre	116
The Entertainer	11 – 30 November 1957	Archie Rice	Tour: Edinburgh, Oxford and Brighton	24
The Entertainer	12 February – 10 May 1958	Archie Rice	Royale Theatre, New York	97
Night of 100 Stars	24 July 1958	–	London Palladium	1
Coriolanus	7 July – 27 November 1959	Coriolanus	Shakespeare Memorial Theatre, Stratford-upon-Avon	48
Night of 100 Stars	23 July 1959	Archie Rice	London Palladium	1
Gala for Fréjus disaster victims	15 December 1959	Speaker	Lyric Theatre	1
Rhinoceros	28 April – 4 June 1960	Rhinoceros	Royal Court Theatre	
Rhinoceros	8 June – 30 July 1960	Rhinoceros	Strand Theatre	105 (Note: 105 includes the Royal Court performances)
Night of 100 Stars	21 July 1960	Grace Hubbard	London Palladium	1
Becket	5 October 1960 – 25 March 1961	Thomas Becket	St. James Theatre, New York	193
Becket	29 March 1961 –	Henry II	Tour: Boston, Toronto, Philadelphia and New York	193
The Broken Heart	9 July – 8 September 1962	Bassanes; Also director	Chichester Festival Theatre	28
Uncle Vanya	16 July – 8 September 1962	Dr Astrov	Chichester Festival Theatre	28
Semi-Detached	19 November – 1 December 1962	Fred Midway	Tour: Edinburgh and Oxford	16
Semi-Detached	5 December 1962 – 30 March 1963	Fred Midway	Saville Theatre	137
Uncle Vanya	July – 31 August 1963	Dr Astrov; Also director	Chichester Festival Theatre	28
Night of 100 Stars	18 July 1963	Host	London Palladium	1
Uncle Vanya	19 November 1963 – 1 August 1964	Dr Astrov; Also director	The Old Vic	61
The Recruiting Officer	10 December 1963 – 12 December 1964	Captain Brazen	The Old Vic	69
Uncle Vanya	23 – 30 March 1964	Dr Astrov; Also director	Tour: Newcastle and Edinburgh	
Othello	6 – 8 April 1964	Othello	Alexandra Theatre, Birmingham	3
Othello	23 April – 2 June 1964	Othello	The Old Vic	
Othello	21 July – 29 August 1964	Othello	Chichester Festival Theatre	
Night of 100 Stars	23 July 1964	Presenter and speaker	London Palladium	1
The Master Builder	23 – 12 November 1964	Halvard Solness	Tour: Manchester, Leeds and Oxford	12
The Master Builder	17 November 1964 – 9 July 1965	Halvard Solness	The Old Vic	73
The Carnival of the Animals	13 February 1965	Narrator	Royal Albert Hall	73
The Master Builder	12 – 20 March 1965	Halvard Solness	Tour: Glasgow and Coventry	6
Othello	7 September – 30 November 1965	Othello	Tour: Moscow, Berlin, Edinburgh and Newcastle	
Love for Love	9 September – 27 November 1965	Tattle	Tour: Moscow, Berlin, Edinburgh and Newcastle	
Love for Love	20 October 1965 – 9 June 1967	Tattle	The Old Vic	97
Performance in aid of George Devine Award	1965	Archie Rice	The Old Vic	1
Othello	12 September – 3 October 1965	Othello	Queen's Theatre	
Love for Love	9 September – 27 November 1965	Tattle	Shakespeare Memorial Theatre, Stratford-upon-Avon	
Italy, My Italy	January 1967	Speaker	Theatre Royal, Haymarket	1
The Dance of Death	21 February 1967 – 25 July 1969	Edgar	The Old Vic	108
The Dance of Death	17 April 1967 – 9 March 1968	Edgar	Tour: Brighton, Liverpool, Montreal, Toronto, Edinburgh and Oxford	
A Flea in Her Ear	6 September 1967 – 24 July 1969	Etienne Plucheux	The Old Vic	30+
Home and Beauty	7 – 22 March 1969	A.B. Raham	Tour: Norwich, Bradford and Nottingham	
Home and Beauty	8 April – 6 July 1970	A B Raham	The Old Vic	89
Three Sisters	10 April 1970	Chebutikin; Also director	The Old Vic	
The Merchant of Venice	28 April 1970 – 8 January 1971	Shylock	The Old Vic	138
The Merchant of Venice	8 June 1970 – 1 August 1971	Shylock	Cambridge Theatre	
Three Sisters	29 September – 1 October 1970	Chebutikin; Also director	Theatre Royal, Brighton	
The Merchant of Venice	3 – 8 May 1971	Shylock	King's Theatre, Edinburgh	
A celebration in memory of Michel Saint-Denis	27 September 1971	Reader	St. Paul's Church, Covent Garden	1
Long Day's Journey into Night	14 December 1971 – 8 September 1972	James Tyrone	New Theatre and The Old Vic (from 23 August 1972)	122
Sybil	29 October 1972	Reader	Theatre Royal, Haymarket	1
Fanfare	3 January 1973	Reader	Royal Opera House	
Twelfth Night	6 January 1973	Speaker and prologue	The Old Vic	
Gala performance	4 March 1973	Appearance	Yvonne Arnaud Theatre, Guilford	1
Saturday, Sunday, Monday	25 October 1973 – 16 February 1974	Antonio	The Old Vic	42
The Party	18 December 1973 – 21 March 1974	John Tagg	The Old Vic	36
Tribute to the Lady	6 May 1974	Narrator	The Old Vic	1
Royal opening by the Queen	25 October 1976	Speech of Welcome	Royal National Theatre	1
Tribute Gala for the South Atlantic Fund	18 July 1982	Speaker and salutes, Falklands Task Force	London Coliseum	1
Blondel (Gala Performance)	8 November 1983	Spoke prologue	The Old Vic	1
Night of 100 Stars	17 February 1985	Personal appearance	Radio City Music Hall, New York	1
57th Academy Awards	25 March 1985	Presents award	Dorothy Chandler Pavilion, Los Angeles	1
Bob Hope birthday gala	14 May 1985	Akash	Lyric Theatre	
Time	9 April 1986	Akash (as a projection)	Dominion Theatre	

=== As director ===
This table contains Olivier's stage work as a director. It does not include the 15 productions in which he also appeared, which are shown in the table above.

Olivier's director credits
Production	Opening night	Theatre (London, unless otherwise noted)	Notes
The Skin of Our Teeth	16 May 1945	Phoenix Theatre	Soon after opening, the play went on a four-week tour of the UK, then a six-week tour of Europe
Born Yesterday	1 February 1947	Garrick Theatre	
The Proposal	2 February 1949	New Theatre	
A Streetcar Named Desire	1 October 1949	Aldwych Theatre	
The Damascus Blade	13 March 1950	Theatre Royal Newcastle, and tour	
Captain Carvallo	12 June 1950	Royal Lyceum Theatre, Edinburgh	
Captain Carvallo	9 August 1950	Garrick Theatre	
Venus Observed	13 February 1952	New Century Theatre, New York	
The Tumbler	1 February 1960	Shubert Theatre, Boston; Helen Hayes Theatre, New York	At the Helen Hayes Theatre from 24 February 1960
The Chances	3 July 1962	Chichester Festival Theatre	
Hamlet	22 October 1963	The Old Vic	First National Theatre Company production; ran for 27 performances until 4 December 1963
The Crucible	19 January 1965	The Old Vic	
Juno and the Paycock	26 April 1966	The Old Vic	
Three Sisters	4 July 1967	The Old Vic	
The Advertisement	16 September 1968	Tour: Montreal & Toronto	Co-director with Donald MacKechnie
Love's Labour's Lost	19 December 1968	The Old Vic	
Amphitryon	25 June 1971	New Theatre	
Eden End	4 April 1974	The Old Vic	
Filumena	10 February 1980	St. James Theatre, New York City	

== Filmography ==
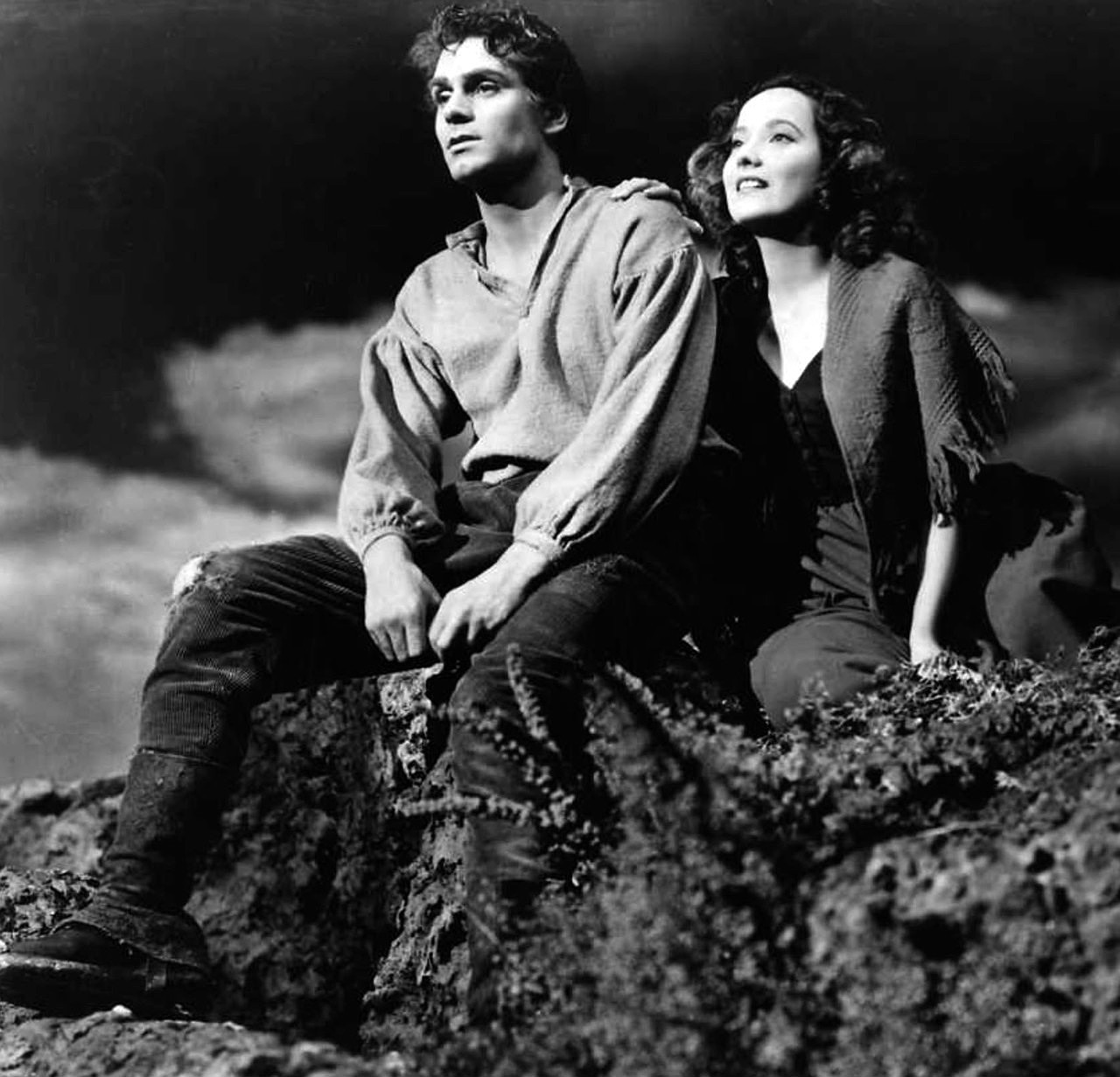
Olivier with Merle Oberon in the 1939 film Wuthering Heights

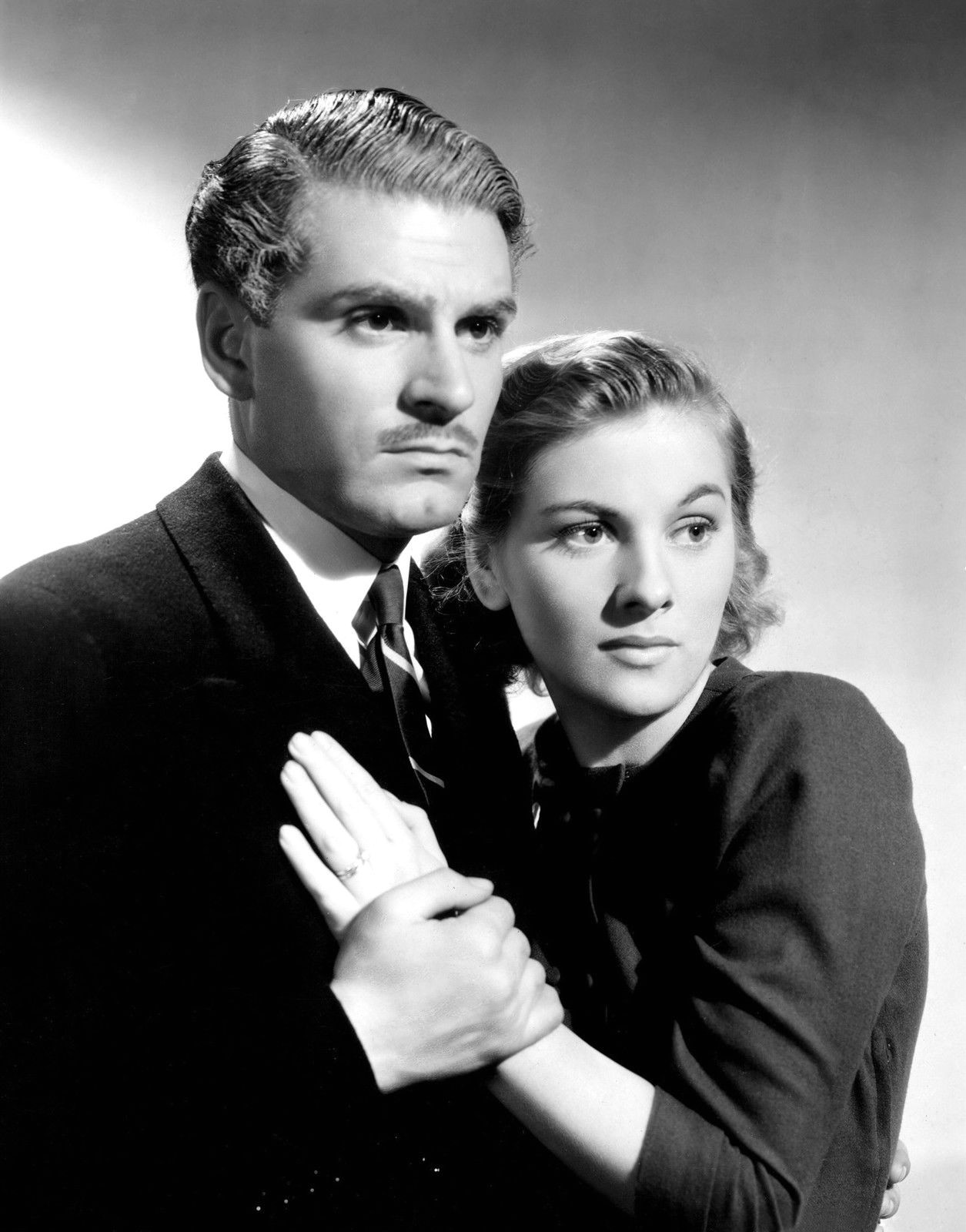
Olivier with Joan Fontaine in the 1940 film Rebecca

Filmography of Olivier
Film	Year	Role	Notes	Ref.
Too Many Crooks	1930	The Man		
The Temporary Widow	1930	Peter Bille		
Friends and Lovers	1931	Lieutenant Nichols		
The Yellow Ticket	1931	Julian Rolfe	Released in the UK as The Yellow Passport	
Potiphar's Wife	1931	Straker		
Westward Passage	1932	Nick Allen		
Perfect Understanding	1933	Nicholas Randall		
No Funny Business	1933	Clive Dering		
Moscow Nights	1935	Captain Ivan Ignatoff		
As You Like It	1936	Orlando		
Conquest of the Air	1936	Vincent Lunardi		
Fire Over England	1937	Michael Ingolby	His first pairing with Vivien Leigh	
The Divorce of Lady X	1938	Logan	His first Technicolor film	
Q Planes	1939	Tony McVane		
Wuthering Heights	1939	Heathcliff		
21 Days	1940	Larry Durrant		
Rebecca	1940	Maxim de Winter		
Pride and Prejudice	1940	Fitzwilliam Darcy		
That Hamilton Woman	1941	Horatio Nelson		
49th Parallel	1941	Johnnie, the Trapper		
Words for Battle	1941	Narrator	Co-production between the Ministry of Information and the Crown Film Unit	
The Volunteer	1943	Himself	Made in conjunction with the Ministry of Information	
Malta G.C.	1943	Narrator	Co-production between the Ministry of Information and the Crown Film Unit	
The Demi-Paradise	1943	Ivan Kouznetsoff		
This Happy Breed	1944	Narrator	Uncredited	
Henry V	1944	King Henry V	Also director and producer	
Hamlet	1948	Prince Hamlet	Also director and producer	
Father's Little Dividend	1950	Film Industry Visitor		
The Magic Box	1951	Police Constable 94-B		
Carrie	1952	George Hurstwood		
The Beggar's Opera	1953	Captain MacHeath	Co-producer, with Herbert Wilcox	
Richard III	1955	Richard III	Also director and producer	
The Prince and the Showgirl	1957	Charles, the Prince Regent	Also director and producer	
The Devil's Disciple	1959	General John Burgoyne		
The Entertainer	1960	Archie Rice		
Spartacus	1960	Marcus Licinius Crassus		
Term of Trial	1962	Graham Weir		
Uncle Vanya	1963	Dr Astrov	Film version of National Theatre Company production	
Bunny Lake Is Missing	1965	Supt. Newhouse		
Othello	1965	Othello	Film version of National Theatre Company production	
Khartoum	1966	Mahdi		
Romeo and Juliet	1968	Narrator		
The Shoes of the Fisherman	1968	Piotr Ilyich Kamenev		
Oh! What a Lovely War	1969	Field Marshal Sir John French		
Dance of Death	1969	Edgar	Film version of National Theatre Company production	
Battle of Britain	1969	Air Chief Marshal Sir Hugh Dowding		
Three Sisters	1970	Dr Ivan Chebutikin	Also director; film version of National Theatre Company production	
Nicholas and Alexandra	1971	Count Witte		
Lady Caroline Lamb	1972	The Duke of Wellington		
Sleuth	1972	Andrew Wyke		
The Rehearsal	1974	Cast member		
Marathon Man	1976	Dr Christian Szell aka "The White Angel"		
The Seven-Per-Cent Solution	1976	Professor Moriarty		
A Bridge Too Far	1977	Dr Jan Spaander		
The Betsy	1978	Loren Hardeman		
The Boys from Brazil	1978	Ezra Lieberman		
A Little Romance	1979	Julius Edmond Santorin		
Dracula	1979	Abraham Van Helsing		
The Jazz Singer	1980	Cantor Rabinovitch		
Inchon	1981	General Douglas MacArthur		
Clash of the Titans	1981	Zeus		
The Jigsaw Man	1983	Admiral Sir Gerald Scaith		
The Bounty	1984	Admiral Hood		
Wild Geese II	1985	Rudolf Hess		
War Requiem	1989	Old Soldier	Final film role	
Sky Captain and the World of Tomorrow	2004	Dr Totenkopf	Archive footage; Posthumous release	

== Selected radio broadcasts ==
All the productions shown were for BBC radio.

Selected radio broadcasts of Olivier
Programme	Date
The Winter's Tale	January 1935
For Us, The Living	April 1941
Henry V	April 1942
Poetry Reading	July 1942
Christopher Columbus	October 1942
Maud	October 1942
Trafalgar Day	October 1942
Poems by John Pudney	November 1942
The School for Scandal	December 1942
Poetry Reading	December 1943
The Ancient Mariner	February 1944
Henry IV, Part 1 and Part 2	April 1945
Men of Good Will	December 1947
"A Man I Would Like to Meet" (interview)	May 1952
"40 Years of Rep" (interview)	February 1953
The Beggar's Opera (film excerpts)	June 1953
Henry VIII	June 1954
Charter in the Saucer	September 1955
People Today	December 1963
Voice of the North (interview)	November 1964
"Interview on the National Theatre"	July 1965
"Portrait of George Devine"	April 1966
The Time of My Life: "Dame Sybil Thorndike"	August 1966
"Sir Laurence Olivier Conversation"	October 1969
We'll Hear a Play	January 1971
"Remembering Michel Saint-Denis"	October 1971
"Dame Gladys Cooper: A Family Portrait"	April 1972
Bound to Let On	November 1972
The Bob Hope Story	August 1973
Rattigan's Theatre	February 1976
"Portrait of Sir William Walton"	January 1977

== Television ==
Television appearances of Olivier
Programme	Year	Role	Notes	Ref.
Sir Alexander Korda (1893–1956)	14 April 1956	Participant		
John Gabriel Borkman	20 November 1958	John Gabriel Borkman		
The Moon and Sixpence	30 October 1959	Charles Strickland	First shown on US television	
The Power and the Glory	29 October 1961	Priest	Originally produced for American television	
Great Acting: "Laurence Olivier"	26 February 1966	Contributor		
Male of the Species	3 January 1969	Narrator	First shown on US television	
David Copperfield	15 March 1969	Mr Creakle	First shown on US television	
Parkinson	1970	Guest		
Long Day's Journey into Night	9 March 1973	James Tyrone Sr.	First shown on US television	
The World at War	31 October 1973 – 8 May 1974	Narrator	26 episodes	
The Morecambe & Wise Show, Christmas Special	25 December 1973	Guest		
The Dick Cavett Show	1974	Guest		
The Merchant of Venice	16 March 1974	Shylock	First shown on US television	
Love Among the Ruins	6 March 1975	Sir Arthur Glanville-Jones	First shown on US television	
Arena: "Theatre"	1 October 1975	Interviewee		
Laurence Olivier Presents: "The Collection"	5 December 1976	Harry		
Laurence Olivier Presents: "Cat on a Hot Tin Roof"	12 December 1976	Big Daddy		
Laurence Olivier Presents: "Hindle Wakes"	19 December 1976	–	Co-director only	
Jesus of Nazareth	10 April 1977	Nicodemus		
Laurence Olivier Presents: "Saturday, Sunday, Monday"	1 January 1978	Antonio		
Laurence Olivier Presents: "Come Back, Little Sheba"	7 January 1978	Doc Delaney		
Laurence Olivier Presents: "Daphne Laureola"	14 January 1978	Sir Joseph		
Brideshead Revisited: "Home and Abroad"	20 October 1981	Lord Marchmain		
Brideshead Revisited: "Brideshead Revisited"	22 December 1981	Lord Marchmain		
A Voyage Round My Father	2 March 1982	Clifford Mortimer		
Laurence Olivier: A Life	24 October 1982	Interviewee		
King Lear	3 April 1983	King Lear		
Mr. Halpern and Mr. Johnson	28 August 1983	Joseph Halpern		
A Talent for Murder	19 December 1983	Dr Anthony Wainwright		
Wagner	16 June 1984	Sigmund von Pfeufer		
The Ebony Tower	8 December 1984	Henry Breasley		
The Last Days of Pompeii	4 May 1984	Gaius	First shown on US television	
Peter the Great	9 August 1986	William of Orange	Third episode of four	
Lost Empires	24 October 1986	Harry Burrard		

== See also ==
- List of awards and nominations received by Laurence Olivier

== Notes and references ==
=== Sources ===
- Beckett, Francis (2005). Olivier. London: Haus. ISBN 978-1-904950-38-7.
- Billington, Michael (2004). "Olivier, Laurence Kerr, Baron Olivier (1907–1989)". Oxford Dictionary of National Biography (online ed.). Oxford University Press. doi:10.1093/ref:odnb/38623. (Subscription, Wikipedia Library access or UK public library membership required.)
- Bragg, Melvyn (1989) [1984]. Laurence Olivier. London: Sceptre. ISBN 978-0-14-003863-7.
- Coleman, Terry (2006). Olivier: The Authorised Biography. London: Bloomsbury. ISBN 978-0-7475-8080-5.
- Hall, Peter (1984) [1983]. Peter Hall's Diaries. London: Hamish Hamilton. ISBN 978-0-241-11285-4.
- Herbert, Ian (1978). Who's Who in the Theatre: a Biographical Record of the Contemporary Stage. London: Pitman Publishing. ISBN 978-0-2730-1195-8.
- Holden, Anthony (1988). Laurence Olivier. London: Weidenfeld and Nicolson. ISBN 978-0-297-79089-1.
- Jackson, Russell (2013). Gielgud, Olivier, Ashcroft, Dench: Great Shakespeareans. London: Bloomsbury. ISBN 978-1-4725-1544-5.
- Munn, Michael (2007). Lord Larry: The Secret Life of Laurence Olivier: a Personal and Intimate Portrait. London: Robson Books. ISBN 978-1-86105-977-2.
- Niemi, Robert (2006). History in the Media: Film and Television. ABC-CLIO. ISBN 978-1-57607-952-2.
- Olivier, Laurence (1994) [1982]. Confessions of an Actor. New York: Simon and Schuster. ISBN 978-0-14-006888-7.
- Tanitch, Robert (1985). Olivier. London: Thames & Hudson. ISBN 978-0-5000-1363-2.
