= Silvio Narizzano =

Canadian film and television director (1927–2011)

- Born: 8 February 1927; Montreal, Quebec, Canada
- Died: 26 July 2011 (aged 84); London, England
- Education: Bishop's University
- Occupations: Director; producer
- Years active: 1951–1995

Silvio Narizzano (8 February 1927 – 26 July 2011) was a Canadian film and television director and producer, long based in the United Kingdom. He was best known for directing the acclaimed 1966 comedy-drama film Georgy Girl, which is considered a classic of the Swinging London era. He was also a prolific director of television dramas.

Over the course of his career, he won two British Academy Television Award for Best Drama Series, with two additional nominations for Best Single Drama. He was also nominated for the Golden Bear, the Palme d'Or, and a Directors Guild of America Award.

== Early life and education ==
Narizzano was born in Montreal, Quebec to Italian American parents and was educated at Bishop's University. After graduation, he worked at the Mountain Playhouse in Montreal, and before joining the Canadian Broadcasting Corporation as an assistant to Norman Jewison, Arthur Hiller and Ted Kotcheff. During this time, he directed a documentary about Tyrone Guthrie.

Narizzano's cinematic influences included Richard Lester, Tony Richardson, John Schlesinger, and the French New Wave.

== Career ==
=== Television ===
Narizzano was a director on the CBC programmes Tales of Adventure and General Motors Theatre. In the mid-1950s, he and many other Canadian creatives (including Jewison and Kotcheff) moved to the United Kingdom at the recommendation of Sydney Newman, the former CBC chief-turned-head of drama for ITV. Narizzano directed episodes of ITV Play of the Week and ITV Television Playhouse. He also directed the West End plays Breakfast for One (1961, Arts Theatre) and License to Murder (1963, Vaudeville Theatre).

He directed The Glass Menagerie for Granada TV (1963), and the made-for-television films Staying On (1980, adapted from Paul Scott's novel of the same name), Young Shoulders for BBC's Play for Today (1985) from John Wain's novel, and The Body in the Library (1984, adapted from the Agatha Christie murder mystery). His Come Back, Little Sheba (1977), a television version of the play by William Inge, was broadcast as part of the anthology series Laurence Olivier Presents. In 1966, he won a BAFTA TV Award for Best Drama Series.

In 1990, Narizzano directed a pilot for a British detective series: Inspector Alleyn Mysteries based on the novels by Dame Ngaio Marsh written in the 1930s. The pilot, titled "Artists in Crime", was first aired 23 December 1990 on BBC1.

His last directing credit was a 1995 episode of Space Precinct.

=== Film ===
He made his film directorial debut in 1965, with Hammer Horror's Fanatic (1965), starring Tallulah Bankhead (in her final film), Stefanie Powers, and an early role for Donald Sutherland.

Narizzano's most successful film was the comedy-drama Georgy Girl (1966), which received four Academy Award nominations as well as a BAFTA nomination for Best British Film, and was entered into the 16th Berlin International Film Festival.

In 1968, he directed his only Hollywood film Blue, a Western starring Terence Stamp and Karl Malden. He followed this with Loot, the 1970 film of Joe Orton's play of the same name, which was entered into the 1971 Cannes Film Festival. He then directed Redneck (1973); a British-Italian crime thriller starring Franco Nero and Telly Savalas, and The Sky Is Falling (1975); an off-beat Spanish folk horror film with Dennis Hopper and Carroll Baker.

His other work included the comedy-drama Why Shoot the Teacher? (1977), his only film made in his native Canada; and Demi Moore's debut film Choices (1981).

== Personal life ==
Narizzano was bisexual and was in a longtime relationship with screenwriter Win Wells.

From the 1960s, Narizzano divided his time between London and Mojácar, Spain. He suffered from recurring depression in adulthood, which worsened in the 1980s following the death of Wells in 1983. He spent time with a Buddhist retreat in southeast London and Bible study in Greenwich with a life in semi-reclusion.

Toward the end of his life, Narizzano was referred to a psychiatric unit which was part of a voluntary inpatient facility for complex depression and anxiety which provided practical and emotional support as part of St. Pancras Hospital.

=== Death ===
Narizzano died in London on July 26, 2011, aged 84.

== Filmography ==
=== Film ===
Year	Title
1965	Fanatic
1966	Georgy Girl
1968	Blue
1970	Loot
1973	Redneck
1975	The Sky Is Falling
1977	Why Shoot the Teacher?
1978	The Class of Miss MacMichael
1981	Choices

=== Television ===
Year	Title	Notes
1952	Tales of Adventure	6 episodes
1952-55	General Motors Theatre	8 episodes
1953	Playbill	Episode: "The Apple"
1956-64	ITV Play of the Week	16 episodes
1956-59	ITV Television Playhouse	5 episodes
1959	DuPont Show of the Month	Episode: "The Fallen Idol"
1960	On Trial	Episode: "Oscar Wilde"
1961	Play of the Week	Episode: "No Exit/The Indifferent Lover"
1961	Family Solicitor	Episode: "The Meeting"
1962-65	Zero One	5 episodes
1962	Saki	4 episodes
1963	Maupassant	2 episodes
1964	Drama 61-67	Episode: "Studio '64: Better Luck Next Time"
1964	Paris 1900	6 episodes
1965	Story Parade	Episode: "The Old Boys"
1965	The Wednesday Thriller	Episode: "The Babysitter"
1966	Court Martial	Episode: "All Is a Dream to Me"
1966	Thirteen Against Fate	Episode: "The Widower"
1971-84	Play for Today	2 episodes
1973	Country Matters	Episode: "The Little Farm"
1974	BBC2 Playhouse	Episode: "The Cafeteria"
1986	Mystery!	Episode: "Agatha Christie's Miss Marple: The Body in the Library 1"
1990-93	The Inspector Alleyn Mysteries	2 episodes
1995	Space Precinct	Episode: "Smelter Skelter"

==== TV films and miniseries ====
Year	Title
1958	Doomsday for Dyson
1963	The Glass Menagerie
1961	Twenty-Four Hours in a Woman's Life
1971	Poet Game
1978	Come Back, Little Sheba
1980	Staying On
1984	The Body in the Library

== Awards and nominations ==
Institution	Year	Category	Work	Result	Ref.
Berlin International Film Festival	1966	Golden Bear	Georgy Girl	Won	
Berlin International Film Festival	1966	OCIC Award	Georgy Girl	Nominated	
British Academy Film Awards	1967	Best British Film	Georgy Girl	Nominated	
British Academy Television Awards	1958	Best Drama Production	—N/a	Won	
British Academy Television Awards	1965	Best Drama Series	Play of the Week ("The Changeling", "Women Beware Women"), Story Parade ("The Old Boys"), Paris 1900, The Wednesday Thriller ("The Babysitter")	Won	
British Academy Television Awards	1974	Best Single Drama	Country Matters ("The Little Farm")	Nominated	
British Academy Television Awards	1981	Best Single Drama	Staying On	Nominated	
Canadian Film Awards	1977	Best Director	Why Shoot the Teacher?	Nominated	
Cannes Film Festival	1971	Palme d'Or	Loot	Nominated	
Chicago International Film Festival	1981	Gold Hugo	Choices	Nominated	
Directors Guild of America Awards	1967	Outstanding Directing – Feature Film	Georgy Girl	Nominated	
Valladolid International Film Festival	1967	Best Film	Georgy Girl	Won	
