= Tristan Rawson =

English actor (1888–1974)

Rawson with Edyth Goodall in If Four Walls Told, 1922

Capel Tristan Rawson (20 January 1888 – 20 May 1974), known professionally as Tristan Rawson, was an English actor

After an early career as an opera singer in Germany, he took up amateur dramatics in Switzerland during the First World War and on returning to England he turned professional in 1919 and pursued a career lasting forty years. He became particularly associated with Shakespearean roles, and played in more than forty Shakespeare productions. He established a long connection with the Regent's Park Open Air Theatre where he appeared in many summer seasons between 1938 and 1960. He was mostly known as a stage actor, but broadcast on BBC radio and television, and appeared in four cinema films.

In addition to his acting, Rawson adapted German, French and Spanish plays for the British stage, working with his younger brother, the playwright Graham Rawson.

== Life and career ==
=== Early years ===
Rawson was born in Marylebone, London on 20 January 1888, the elder of two sons of Harry Stanhope Rawson and his wife Isabel Ada, née Hanbury. His younger brother, Graham, became a playwright. He was educated at a boarding school in Eastbourne, Sussex. He began his performing career as a singer, playing baritone roles at the Cologne Opera, where he made his debut in September 1910 and remained for four years. In October 1914 he married the pianist Guida Franken (1894–1920), a pupil of Carl Friedberg. The couple had a daughter and a son.

During the First World War Rawson was a member of the company of the Zurich Opera, where he created the role of Barak in Busoni's Turandot. He was persuaded to take part in an amateur production given by "The English Players" – organised by James Joyce – of The Importance of Being Earnest in the leading role of John Worthing. In the 1970s Tom Stoppard made that production the crux of his comedy Travesties. (Note: Rawson is mentioned in Stoppard's play, but does not appear; his fellow cast member Henry Carr is the fulcrum of the plot.) Rawson continued to act with the company during 1918 in plays including Hindle Wakes, The Dark Lady of the Sonnets, and She Stoops to Conquer.

=== West End ===
In 1919, back in England, Rawson made his professional debut on the non-musical stage with the Lena Ashwell players, under the direction of D. A. Clarke-Smith. In 1920, at the Lyric Theatre, Hammersmith, he played Silvius in As You Like It in Nigel Playfair's production, and during the long run of The Beggar's Opera he was one of the actors playing the role of Lockit. In July 1920 he appeared in Down Stream, a play by his brother, Graham. Guida Rawson died aged 26 in 1920, and the following year Rawson married the actress Mary Barton. He made a single silent film, The Fair Maid of Perth, in 1923, but did not return to the film studios until the 1950s. In 1927 he made his first radio broadcast for the BBC, but did little further radio work until the 1940s.

From left: Claude Rains, John Gielgud, Felix Aylmer and Rawson in Robert E. Lee by John Drinkwater, 1923

Throughout the 1920s Rawson was continually seen in West End productions and occasionally on tour. He was in plays ranging from modern comedy to old melodrama (East Lynne), Elizabethan classics (Kent in Edward II and Bassanio in The Merchant of Venice), new costume drama (Robert E. Lee by John Drinkwater), and Ibsen (Borgheim in Little Eyolf). Each Christmas season from 1927 to 1932 he played the Genie and Mr Carey in Where the Rainbow Ends.

During the 1920s Rawson collaborated with his brother on adaptations of foreign plays, Rawson was an excellent linguist (he played a version of Faust in German in 1930) and the brothers produced English versions of German, French and Spanish plays: Wilhelm von Scholtz's The Race with the Shadow (1921), Georges Duhamel's The Mental Athletes (1923), Goethe's Faust (1924), Jules Romains's The Dictator (1928), Jacinto Benavente's The Princess (1929) and Eberhard Wolfgang Möller's Douamont (1929).

In the 1930s Rawson's repertoire tilted markedly towards Shakespeare. He played Marcellus, Laertes and Claudius in productions of Hamlet, Richmond and Hastings in productions of Richard III, Page in The Merry Wives of Windsor, Cinna in Julius Caesar, the Duke of Venice in Othello, Theseus in A Midsummer Night's Dream, Orsino in Twelfth Night, the Duke in As You Like It, Leonato in Much Ado About Nothing and Simonides in Pericles.

=== Later years ===
During the late 1930s Rawson built up an association with the Regent's Park Open Air Theatre, and during the 1940s this continued with eleven Shakespearean roles, as well as roles such as Raphael in Tobias and the Angel, and Raphael in Faust. During the 1945 season at the Shakespeare Memorial Theatre, Stratford Upon Avon he appeared in Twelfth Night, The Merry Wives of Windsor, Othello and Much Ado About Nothing. From 1946 to 1950 he appeared each Christmas, at various West End theatres, as Dr Livesey in Treasure Island. During the 1940s he became a frequent broadcaster on BBC radio.

During the 1950s Rawson made three cinema films: Time Gentlemen, Please! (1952), The Missing Man (1953) and Front Page Story (1954). He appeared on BBC Television in several productions, including a Francis Durbridge detective serial, The Broken Horseshoe (1952). The Open-Air Theatre connection continued for the rest of Rawson's stage career. He played roles in fifteen Shakespeare productions there between 1951 and 1960, his last role being Theseus in A Midsummer Night's Dream.

Rawson died at his home in Hampstead, London, on 20 May 1974 aged 86. His second wife predeceased him.

== Notes, references and sources ==
=== Sources ===
- Curzon, Henri de (1913). Guide musical; revue internationale de la musique et de theâtres lyriques. Brussels and Paris: Schott. OCLC 297252907.
- Ellmann, Richard (1983). James Joyce (second ed.). Oxford: Oxford University Press. ISBN 978-0-19-281465-4.
- Griffel, Margaret Ross (1990). Operas in German: A Dictionary. New York, Westport and London: Greenwood Press. ISBN 978-0-313-25244-0.
- Parker, John; Freda Gaye; Ian Herbert (1978). Who Was Who in the Theatre. Detroit: Gale Research. OCLC 310466458.
- Stoppard, Tom (1993). Travesties (second ed.). London: Faber & Faber. ISBN 978-0-571-10683-7.
