= Jay Benedict =

American actor and casting director (1951–2020)

- Born: Jaudon Edward Benedit; April 11, 1951; Burbank, California, U.S.
- Died: April 4, 2020 (aged 68); London, England
- Occupations: Actor, voice actor, casting director
- Years active: 1963–2017
- Spouse(s): Vanessa Pereira (m. 1987, divorced) Phoebe Scholfield (m. 2009)
- Children: 3

Jaudon Edward Benedict (April 11, 1951 – April 4, 2020) was an American actor, voice actor, and casting director, who spent most of his professional life in the United Kingdom and France.

== Early life ==
Benedict was born in Burbank, California to Edward Jaudon Benedict (1925-1994) and his German wife Renate Elizabeth Graupe (b. 1926). He moved to Europe with his family in the 1960s, and spent most of his working life in England.

== Career ==
=== Theatre ===
Benedict's theatrical credits include The Rocky Horror Show in the Kings Road in the early 1970s, Harold Pinter's production of Sweet Bird of Youth, The Reverend Lee in The Foreigner and Riccardo in Franco Zeffirelli's production of Filumena in which he played opposite Pierce Brosnan in the latter's first stage role, and Bill Wilson, co-founder of Alcoholics Anonymous, in a touring production of "One Day at a Time". In 2013, he appeared opposite Steven Berkoff and Andree Bernard in the world premiere of the former's one act play An Actor's Lament at The Berkoff Performing Arts Centre at Alton College, followed by a second performance at The Sinden Theatre, Homewood School, Tenterden in Kent, two nights at The Maltings Theatre & Cinema in Berwick-upon-Tweed and then a three-week run at the Assembly Hall in Edinburgh as part of the Edinburgh Festival Fringe. In May 2014, it was revived with a short run at the Theatre Royal, Margate with a further one-week run scheduled at The Gaiety Theatre, Dublin, in September 2014.

In August 2014, he returned to the Edinburgh Festival Fringe in the world premiere of Terry Jastrow's The Trial of Jane Fonda, playing World War II veteran Archie Bellows.

=== Film and television ===
Benedict's first film role, at the age of 11, was in the 1963 French film La Bande à Bobo. In 1977, he played Deak in the Tosche Station scenes in Star Wars, which were deleted from the film before release. Subsequent film appearances include The Dirty Dozen: Next Mission (Didier le Clair), Icon (Carey Jordan), The White Knight (Ottoman Ambassador), The Russia House (Spikey), Saving Grace (the MC), Rewind and The Dark Knight Rises (Rich Twit). He played Russ Jorden, Newt's father, in the extended "Special Edition" of Aliens (1986). In 2003 he was third lead in Vicente Aranda's version of Carmen, playing Don Prospero.

He also appeared widely on television, most notably as Doug Hamilton on the soap opera Emmerdale, Captain/Major John Kieffer in on Foyle's War, Frank Crowe in an episode of the BBC's award-winning 2003 television miniseries Seven Wonders of the Industrial World, Bruce in Come Back, Little Sheba with Laurence Olivier, John E. Jones III in Nova's Judgment Day: Intelligent Design on Trial, Alan Kalanak in the 2001 Christmas Special edition of Jonathan Creek and Yves Houdet in Thames Television's mini-series of Angus Wilson's Anglo-Saxon Attitudes. Other television appearances include Lilyhammer as Agent Becker, Sharpe's Honour (General Verigny), Bergerac (Martin Colley), and Death Train (Halloran).

Benedict's credits in France included Paul Matthiews on the soap opera Tide of Life, William H. Wilbur in the miniseries Le Grand Charles (about Charles De Gaulle), Dr. McKenzie in Djihad, and Clerc in La Révolution française.

=== Voice acting ===
He provided the voice for Shiro Hagen in Star Fleet, the English adaptation of the Japanese tokusatsu series X-Bomber. During the 1990s, he was a voice actor for Manga Entertainment, appearing in English dubs of anime like Project A-Ko, GoShogun: The Time Étranger, and Angel Cop, and in various video games. He also participated in the Sandy Frank English dubs of Gamera, the Giant Monster and Mighty Jack, which gained notoriety after being featured on Mystery Science Theater 3000.

Benedict also co-founded the ADR/Loop group Sync or Swim with his wife, Phoebe Scholfield. They wrote and directed the English-language version of Dario Argento's film The Card Player.

Later in his career, he worked as a voice casting director.

== Personal life ==
He was married to actress Phoebe Scholfield and together they ran Sync or Swim, an ADR/Loop group. They also translated and wrote movies together, such as (Il Cartaio), which they translated into English. They had two sons: Leopold Benedict (Before the Rains, Azur & Asmar: The Princes' Quest) and Freddie Benedict (Planet 51, Azur & Asmar: The Princes' Quest). He also had a daughter from his previous marriage to casting director Vanessa Pereira.

Benedict was fluent in English and French, and also spoke German and Spanish.

=== Death ===
Benedict died at Croydon University Hospital on April 4, 2020, a week before his 69th birthday, due to complications arising from a COVID-19 infection during the pandemic in London. He is survived by his mother Renate (nee Graupe, b. 1926 in Germany), his wife Phoebe (b. 1958) and his children Alexis (b. 1984), Frederick (b. 1996) and Leopold (b. 1997).

== Filmography ==
=== Film ===
==== Actor ====
| Year | Title | Role | Notes |
|---|---|---|---|
| 1963 | La bande à Bobo | | |
| 1977 | Star Wars | Deak | Scenes deleted |
| 1979 | Winterspelt | Sergeant | |
| 1979 | Hanover Street | Cpl. Daniel Giler | |
| 1979 | Licensed to Love and Kill | Mad Professor | |
| 1980 | The Mine and the Minotaur | Gerry Gallagher | |
| 1982 | Victor Victoria | Guy Langois | |
| 1983 | The Lonely Lady | Dr. Sloan | |
| 1984 | Where Is Parsifal? | Luke | |
| 1985 | Gamera | Additional voices | Sandy Frank English dub |
| 1986 | Aliens | Russ Jorden | Special edition only |
| 1989 | La Révolution française: Les années terribles | Clerc | |
| 1989 | The Hostage of Europe | Capt. Henry Fox | |
| 1989 | Diamond Skulls | Joe Dimandino | |
| 1990 | The Russia House | Spikey | |
| 1992 | Shining Through | War Room Officer | |
| 1992 | Project A-Ko | Captain Napolipolita (voice) | Manga Entertainment English dub |
| 1993 | Genghis Cohn | Dr. Burkhardt | |
| 1994 | The Patriots | NSA Agent | |
| 1996 | Beaumarchais | Man in Grey | |
| 1996 | GoShogun: The Time Étranger | Leonardi Medici Bundle (voice) | Manga Entertainment English dub |
| 1997 | Double Team | Brandon | |
| 1998 | Rewind | Blondin | |
| 2000 | Saving Grace | Master of Ceremonies | |
| 2000 | Vatel | King's Commode Valet | |
| 2002 | Pets | Francois (voice) | |
| 2003 | The Petersburg-Cannes Express | | |
| 2003 | Carmen | Próspero | |
| 2004 | Secret Agents | American Man | |
| 2005 | Beneath Still Waters | Additional voices | |
| 2005 | Nature Unleashed: Earthquake | Reed | |
| 2006 | The White Knight | Ottoman Ambassador | |
| 2007 | The Apocalypse Code | Rayli | |
| 2008 | A Fox's Tale | Additional voices | English dub |
| 2008 | High School Musical: el desafío | Additional voices | |
| 2010 | Chico and Rita | Additional voices | |
| 2012 | The Dark Knight Rises | Rich Twit | |
| 2013 | The Hundred-Year-Old Man Who Climbed Out of the Window and Disappeared | French Foreign Minister | |
| 2015 | Moonwalkers | Colonel Dickford | |
| 2016 | I.T. | Detective Unrein | |
| 2016 | Demain tout commence | Doctor | |
| 2017 | Madame | Dr. Schurman | |
| 2017 | Hostile | Wounded Man | |
| 2017 | Goodbye Christopher Robin | Additional voices | |
| 2017 | Holy Lands | Dr. Schwimann | |
| 2019 | Scarefest | Lindsey Carpenter | |
| 2019 | A Call to Spy | Additional voices | |

==== Casting department ====
- Love Actually (2003) - ADR casting
- Thunderbirds (2004) - ADR casting
- Being Julia (2004) - ADR casting
- The Nun (2005) - ADR casting
- Imagine Me & You (2005) - ADR casting
- Beneath Still Waters (2005) - ADR casting
- The Thief Lord (2006) - ADR casting
- The Detonator (2006) - ADR casting
- The Kovak Box (2006) - ADR casting
- Perfume: The Story of a Murderer (2006) - ADR casting
- The Abandoned (2006) - ADR casting: UK
- Flight of Fury (2007) - ADR casting
- The Golden Compass (2007) - ADR casting
- Angus, Thongs and Perfect Snogging (2008) - ADR casting
- The Secret of Moonacre (2008) - ADR casting
- The Mortician (2011) - Additional casting
- W.E. (2011) - ADR casting: UK
- A Dangerous Method (2011) - ADR casting
- Prometheus (2012) - ADR casting
- The Numbers Station (2013) - Additional ADR casting
- Burnt (2015) - ADR casting: UK
- The Infiltrator (2015) - ADR casting
- Morgan (2016) - ADR casting
- Another Day of Life (2018) - Voice casting
- Cold Pursuit (2019) - ADR casting
- A Call to Spy (2019) - ADR casting: UK
- The Informer (2019) - ADR casting: post-production
- Radioactive (2019) - ADR casting
- The Postcard Killings (2020) - ADR casting
- The Last Bus (2021) - ADR casting

=== Television ===
| Year | Title | Role | Notes |
|---|---|---|---|
| 1975 | Couples | Pete | 4 episodes |
| 1976 | Forget Me Not | Pierre Latour | Episode: "Old" |
| 1976 | Dickens of London | Young Man | Miniseries |
| 1976 | Angels | Mike Jepson | Episode: "There's Always Tomorrow" |
| 1977 | Yanks Go Home | Pvt. Floyd Tutt | 6 episodes |
| 1977 | Laurence Olivier Presents | Bruce | Episode: "Come Back, Little Sheba" |
| 1978 | People Like Us | Al Swinger | Miniseries |
| 1978 | Tycoon | Robert Gergen | 2 episodes |
| 1979 | The Other Side | Prager | Episode: "Contacts" |
| 1980 | Monkey | Additional voices | English dub 3 episodes |
| 1980 | Oppenheimer | SED Officer | Miniseries |
| 1981 | When the Boat Comes In | Luis | Episode: "Roll of Honour" |
| 1981–82 | How We Used to Live | Anton Podemski | 4 episodes |
| 1982 | Star Fleet | Shiro Hagen (voice) | English dub 24 episodes |
| 1982 | Nancy Astor | Medic | Miniseries |
| 1983 | Number 10 | Detective-Constable Edwards | Miniseries |
| 1983 | The Last Day | Marine Sergeant | TV movie |
| 1985 | The Dirty Dozen: Next Mission | Didier Le Clair | TV movie |
| 1986 | Fugitive Alien | Rocky (voice) | English dub TV movie |
| 1986 | Un métier de seigneur | Austin | Miniseries |
| 1987 | Mighty Jack | Additional voices | Sandy Frank English dub TV movie |
| 1988 | Hemingway | | Miniseries |
| 1990 | Bergerac | Martin Colley | Episode: "Diplomatic Incident" |
| 1991 | Fly by Night | Robert Lindsay | Episode: "Furs Flying" |
| 1991 | The Bill | Philip Garrod | Episode: "The Last Laugh" |
| 1991 | To Be the Best | TV Director | Miniseries |
| 1992 | Moon and Son | Brad Moresby | Episode: "SOS from a Gemini" |
| 1992 | Anglo-Saxon Attitudes | Yves Houdet | Miniseries |
| 1992 | Warburg: A Man of Influence | Jimmy | Miniseries |
| 1992 | Unnatural Pursuits | Rick | Episode: "I'm the Author" |
| 1993 | Death Train | Halloran | TV movie |
| 1993 | 2point4 Children | Bob | Episode: "Whoopee, We're All Going to Die" |
| 1993 | Harnessing Peacocks | Eli | TV movie |
| 1994 | Brookside | Dr. O'Keefe | Episode: "Airing" |
| 1994 | Angel Cop | Asura (voice) | Manga Entertainment English dub 6 episodes |
| 1994 | Sharpe's Honour | Verigny | TV movie |
| 1995 | Maigret | Crosby | Episode: "Maigret et la tête d'un homme" |
| 1997 | Les vacances de l'amour | | Episode: "Le secret de Jeanne" |
| 1997 | Emmerdale | Doug Hamilton | 20 episodes |
| 1997 | Les héritiers | Col. Brady | Miniseries |
| 1998 | Only Love | Roger | TV movie |
| 1998 | This Could Be the Last Time | Cowboy Doctor | TV movie |
| 1998 | Tide of Life | Paul Matthiews | |
| 1999 | L'histoire du samedi | Walter Muller | Episode: "Petits nuages d'été" |
| 1999 | RKO 281 | Darryl F. Zanuck | TV movie |
| 2000 | Metropolis | Jeremy | Miniseries |
| 2000 | L.A. 7 | Joni's Boyfriend | Episode: "Making Movies" |
| 2001 | Simsala Grimm | Additional voices | English dub 2 episodes |
| 2001 | Hotel! | Vice President | TV movie |
| 2001 | Jonathan Creek | Alan Kalanak | Episode: "Satan's Chimney" |
| 2001 | Swallow | American User | Miniseries |
| 2003 | Seven Wonders of the Industrial World | Frank Crowe | Episode: "The Hoover Dam" |
| 2003 | La crim' | Alan Greene | Episode: "Un crime virulent" |
| 2003 | Mother Teresa of Calcutta | Father Serrano (voice) | English dub TV movie |
| 2004 | Quai n° 1 | Victor McKee | Episode: "Le bout du tunnel" |
| 2004 | Casualty | Peter | Episode: "The Good Father" |
| 2005 | Icon | Carey Jordan | TV movie |
| 2005 | Sometimes in April | Bowman | TV movie |
| 2005 | Broken News | Mark Ratzenburg | Episode: "Hijack" |
| 2005 | Mansquito | Dr. Aaron Michaels | TV movie |
| 2006 | Genie in the House | Soderburg | Episode: "Cave Dad" |
| 2006 | Le Grand Charles | William H. Wilbur | Miniseries |
| 2006 | Djihad | Dr. McKenzie | TV movie |
| 2006–08 | Foyle's War | Maj. / Captain John Kieffer | 2 episodes |
| 2007 | Judgment Day: Intelligent Design on Trial | Judge John Jones | Documentary |
| 2008 | Queen Victoria's Men | Lord Melbourne | Documentary |
| 2008 | Pinocchio | Additional voices | Miniseries |
| 2011 | Page Eight | Master of the College | TV movie |
| 2012 | Lilyhammer | Agent Becker | Episode: "Reality Check" |
| 2012–13 | Rosamunde Pilcher | Richard Franklin | 2 episodes |
| 2014 | Cilla | Ed Sullivan | Miniseries |
| 2015 | The Gamechangers | Reporter (voice) | TV movie |
| 2015 | London Spy | Phone Voice | Miniseries |
| 2016 | Undercover | Judge Kramer | Miniseries |

=== Video games ===
| Year | Title | Role(s) | Notes |
|---|---|---|---|
| 1995 | Simon the Sorcerer II: The Lion, the Wizard and the Wardrobe | Additional voices | |
| 1995 | Silverload | Additional voices | |
| 1996 | 3 Skulls of the Toltecs | Additional voices | |
| 1997 | The Feeble Files | Additional voices | |
| 1998 | Extreme-G 2 | Additional voices | |
| 1998 | Nightlong: Union City Conspiracy | Joshua Reev | |
| 2001 | Fuzion Frenzy | Additional voices | |
| 2001 | Headhunter | Additional voices | |
| 2002 | Archangel | Nath, Zelath, Miner, Berlin Monk, Sleeping Ghost | |
| 2002 | Conflict: Desert Storm | Additional voices | |
| 2003 | Broken Sword: The Sleeping Dragon | André Lobineau | |
| 2004 | Powerdrome | Jed Clanton | |
| 2004 | Yager | Additional voices | |
| 2004 | Rocky Legends | Additional voices | |
| 2005 | Spartan: Total Warrior | Archimedes | |
| 2005 | Perfect Dark Zero | Additional voices | |
| 2011 | MindJack | Gardner, Additional voices | |

== Partial stage credits ==
| Year | Title | Role | Venue | Notes |
|---|---|---|---|---|
| 1973-79 | The Rocky Horror Show | Ensemble member / Swing | Various | |
| 1979-80 | Guys and Dolls | Benny Southstreet | Bristol Old Vic, Bristol | |
| 1981 | Mary, Mary | Dirk Winston | Thorndike Theatre, Leatherhead | |
| 1982 | The Boy Friend | | Churchill Theatre, Bromley | |
| 1982 | Romantic Comedy | Leo Janowitz | Apollo Theatre, London | |
| 1982 | Romantic Comedy | Leo Janowitz | Watford Palace Theatre, Watford | |
| 1983-84 | Jean Seberg | François Moreuil | Royal National Theatre, London | |
| 1985 | Sweet Bird of Youth | The Heckler | UK tour | |
| 1987-88 | The Foreigner | Rev. David Marshall Lee | Noël Coward Theatre, London | |
| 1987-88 | The Foreigner | Rev. David Marshall Lee | Trafalgar Theatre, London | |
| 1995 | Suzanna Andler | Michael Cayre | Battersea Arts Centre, London | |
