= Redneck (film) =

- Directed by: Silvio Narizzano
- Written by: Masolino D'Amico; Win Wells
- Starring: Franco Nero; Telly Savalas; Mark Lester; Ely Galleani
- Cinematography: Giorgio Tonti
- Edited by: Thom Noble
- Music by: Maurizio Catalano
- Release date: 1973
- Language: English

Redneck (Italian: Senza ragione) is a 1973 Italian-British crime-thriller film directed by Silvio Narizzano.

== Plot ==
Memphis, the “American”, assaulted a jewelry store with “Moskito”, whose real name is Dino Bianco, while Dino's hippie-esque friend Maria is waiting in the getaway car. The action is poorly prepared and the implementation fails, which causes Memphis to react brutally. On their escape, they find the 13-year-old son of the British consul in a stolen car, whom they take hostage. The American's actions are becoming more and more confused and brutal; so he shoots Maria and forces Moskito to drown a German family so that they - Memphis is now wounded - can get to safety. Moskito becomes friends with Lennox, the kidnapped boy, and tries to stop the American from doing what he is doing. A few meters before the border they are caught by the police and are killed.

== Cast ==
- Franco Nero as Mosquito
- Telly Savalas as Memphis
- Mark Lester as Lennox Duncan
- Ely Galleani as Maria
- Duilio Del Prete as Captain Lenzi
- Maria Michi as Princess
- Beatrice Clary as Margaret Duncan
- Bruno Boschetti as Police Officer
- Aldo De Carellis as Riccardo
- Tommy Duggan as Anthony Duncan
- Giuseppe Mattei as Jeweller
- Lara Wendel as German Girl (credited as Daniela Barnes)
