= Edyth Goodall =

Scottish actress

Goodall with Tristan Rawson in If Four Walls Told, 1922

Edyth Shipton Goodall (20 February 1886 – 22 July 1929), professionally known as Edyth Goodall, was a Scottish actress. She was born in Dundee, the daughter of A. E. E. Goodall and his wife Annie, née Shipton.

She made her professional stage debut in 1904 and made her first London appearance in 1907. She appeared in many West End productions and was noted particularly for playing the roles of Fanny Hawthorne in Hindle Wakes (1912) and Maggie Hobson in Hobson's Choice (1916) in their West End premieres. The Era said of her performance in the latter, "Good as her past record is, Miss Edyth Goodall has never done anything equal to her portrayal of this far-sighted, managing, strong-willed, good-hearted daughter of Lancashire".

When Daisy Ashford's The Young Visiters was adapted for the stage in 1920 she played the central role of Ethel Monticue.

Goodall married Leonard Francis Schuster in 1915. They had one child, a son born in 1921. Goodall died in London on 22 July 1929, aged 47.

== References and sources ==
=== Sources ===
- Parker, John; Freda Gaye; Ian Herbert (1978). Who Was Who in the Theatre. Detroit: Gale Research. OCLC 310466458.
