= Faith Brook =

English actress (1922–2012)

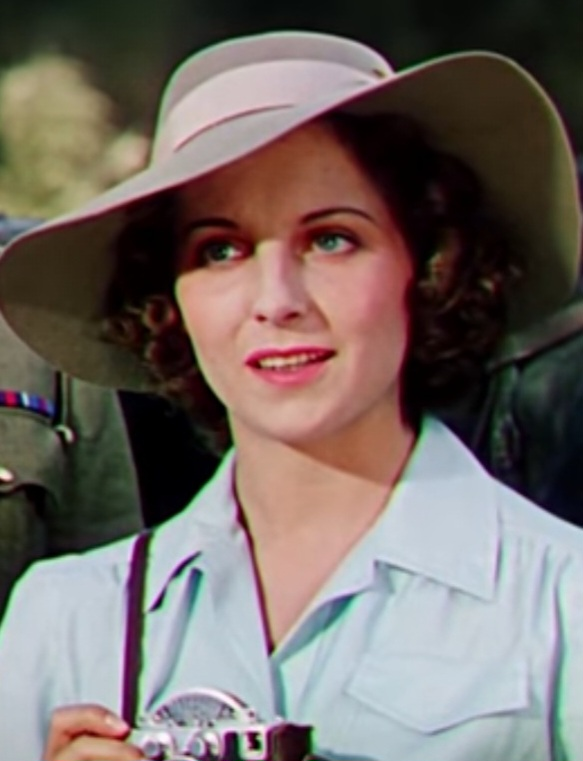
- Brook in Jungle Book (1942)
- Born: 16 February 1922; York, Yorkshire, England
- Died: 11 March 2012 (aged 90); London, England
- Occupation: Actress
- Years active: 1941–2006
- Spouses: Charles Moffett; Michael Horowitz
- Children: 1

Faith Brook (16 February 1922 – 11 March 2012) was an English actress who appeared on stage, in films and on television, generally in upper-class roles. She was the daughter of actor Clive Brook.

== Early years ==
Although she was born in York, England, she was raised in Hollywood. Her father was the actor Clive Brook, and her brother Lyndon Brook was also an actor.

Brook was educated in Los Angeles, London and Gstaad, Switzerland. As a teenager, she studied at the Royal Academy of Dramatic Art.

== Film ==
Brook's screen debut came via a small role in Suspicion (1941). Her first credited film appearance was The Jungle Book (1942). The Encyclopedia of British Film described her as being cast "almost invariably in well-bred roles ..."

== Stage ==
In September 1941, Brook debuted on stage in Lottie Dundass in Santa Barbara.

During World War II, Brook served in Britain's Auxiliary Territorial Service. Following that, she acted in the Bristol Old Vic. Later, in London, she joined the company of The Old Vic.

She also appeared on the London stage in The Colour of Poppies and Uncle Vanya in 2008.

She performed on Broadway, in Letters to Lucerne (1941), You Never Can Tell (1947) and The Cocktail Party (1949).

== Television ==
Brook portrayed Julia Naughton in the American television series Claudia (1952). In Britain, she appeared in War and Peace (1972) on the BBC and The Irish RM on Channel 4, among other programmes.

== Personal life ==
Brook was married twice, first to Charles Moffett and then later to Michael Horowitz. Brook and her second husband had a son.

She was a supporter of the British Humanist Association.

== Selected filmography ==
- Suspicion (1941) - Alice Barham (uncredited)
- Jungle Book (1942) - English Girl
- No Time for Love (1943) - Pert Brunette (uncredited)
- Uneasy Terms (1948) - Viola Alardyse
- Wicked as They Come (1956) - Virginia Collins
- The Intimate Stranger (1956) - Lesley Wilson
- Across the Bridge (1957) - Kay
- Man in the Shadow (1957) - Joan Lennox
- Chase a Crooked Shadow (1958) - Elaine Whitman
- The 39 Steps (1959) - Nannie
- We Shall See (1964) - Alva Collins
- The Heroes of Telemark (1965) - Woman on Bus
- To Sir, with Love (1967) - Grace Evans
- Adelaide (1968) - Dickson
- The Smashing Bird I Used to Know (1969) - Dr. Sands
- Walk a Crooked Path (1969) - Elizabeth Hemming
- War and Peace (1972, BBC TV) - Countess Rostova
- North Sea Hijack (1980) - Prime Minister
- Bloodbath (1979) - Heather
- The Curse of King Tut's Tomb (1980) - Lady Almina Carnarvon
- The Sea Wolves (1980) - Mrs. Grice
- Eye of the Needle (1981) - Lucy's Mother
- The Razor's Edge (1984) - Louisa Bradley (Isabel's Mother)
- Miss Beatty's Children (1992) - Mabel Forster
- Mrs Dalloway (1997) - Lady Bexborough
- AKA (2002) - Contessa de la Reche

== Selected television credits ==
Year	Title	Role	Episode(s)
1949	Martin Kane, Private Eye	Millie Talbot	"The Nevans Murder Trail "
1950	Ripley's Believe It or Not!	Unknown role	"Murder by Moonlight"
1950, 1951	Ford Theatre	Unknown roles	"Heart of Darkness" "Dead on the Vine"
1949–1951	Studio One	Sally Athelny; Joan Bridges; Edith Bastin; Ethel Mummery	"Of Human Bondage" "The Willow Cabin " "Away from It All" "Mr. Mummery's Suspicion"
1950–1951	Kraft Television Theatre	Unknown roles	"The Great Broxopp" "Mrs. Dane's Defense" "Dear Brutus"
1951–1952	Robert Montgomery Presents	Unknown roles	"An Inspector Calls" "Happy Birthday, George" "The Law-Abiding"
1957	White Hunter	Patricia	"Big Bwana Brady "
1958	Saturday Playhouse	Connie Crawford	"Heroes Don't Care"
1958	Sunday Night Theatre	Ida Hay	"Honour Bright"
1959	The Invisible Man	Carol Norton	"Picnic with Death"
1961	Alcoa Presents: One Step Beyond	Nurse	"The Prisoner"
1961	Maigret	Aline Calas	“The Simple Case”
1964	Dr. Finlay's Casebook	Fanny Senlac	"A Present from Father"
1964	The Human Jungle	Mrs Thomas	"Wild Goose Chase"
1974	Thriller	Betty Cornfield	"In the Steps of a Dead Man"
1984	The Weather in the Streets	Lady Spencer	TV movie
1991	Miss Marple	Ruth van Rydock	"They Do It With Mirrors"
1993	Zorro	Ynez Risendo	"The Arrival" "Conundrum" "The Discovery"
2000	Paul the Apostle	Sara	TV movie

== Selected radio ==
- The Reluctant Peer by William Douglas-Home broadcast on BBC (1967)
