= Carmen (2003 Spanish film) =

- Film poster by Oscar Mariné
- Directed by: Vicente Aranda
- Screenplay by: Vicente Aranda; Joaquim Jordà
- Based on: Carmen by Prosper Mérimée
- Produced by: Juan Alexander
- Starring: Paz Vega; Leonardo Sbaraglia; Antonio Dechent; Joan Crosas; Jay Benedict
- Cinematography: Paco Femenia
- Edited by: Teresa Font
- Music by: José Nieto
- Production companies: Star Line Productions; Parallel Pictures; Planet Pictures; RTVE; Vía Digital; Telemadrid
- Distributed by: Buena Vista International
- Release date: October 3, 2003
- Running time: 119 minutes
- Country: Spain
- Languages: Spanish; Basque; French
- Budget: €6,398,769

Carmen is a 2003 Spanish drama film directed by Vicente Aranda. The script was written by Aranda and Joaquim Jordà adapting the classic romance of the same name by Prosper Mérimée. Director Vicente Aranda based the plot on Mérimée's original 1847 novella about jealousy and passion, not its famous operatic adaptation by Bizet from 1875, changing some details about the love story between Carmen (Paz Vega) and José (Leonardo Sbaraglia). As in the novella, author Mérimée (Jay Benedict) is portrayed as a French writer who finds the "real" Carmen in early 19th century Spain.

== Plot ==
While traveling through Andalusia, Spain in 1830, Prosper Mérimée, a French writer, meets José, a wanted criminal. José ends up condemned to death by garroting. The day before José is going to be executed, Mérimée, who has befriended the bandit, visits him in prison. From his jail cell, José begins to narrate his tragic story to the sympathetic writer.

José Lizarrabengoa, a serious and proper Basque sergeant in the Spanish army, is stationed in Córdoba. Next to his military headquarters there is a cigar factory where Carmen, a sultry young woman, works. Half gipsy half witch, Carmen is beautiful, flirtatious and has a tempestuous temper. During an argument instigated by Fernanda, a fellow factory worker who has called her gipsy, Carmen retaliates against her rival by slashing Fernanda's face with a knife. Carmen is arrested and José is left in charge of her custody. On the way to prison, Carmen flirts with José and he consents to allow her to escape - his payback is the promise for a night of passion with her. José's breach of military discipline results in his losing his rank and being imprisoned for a while. Carmen keeps her pact, providing José with his first sexual encounter. He is dazzled with the sexual delight to which she introduces him and he can't keep her out of his mind. José encounters Carmen again while he is in Seville guarding the entrance to the city. Carmen seduces him once more. José turns a blind eye to Carmen's smuggler friends, allowing them to pass his post and, as a reward, she pays him with sex.

Without her work at the factory, Carmen is now not only part of a ring of smugglers but supplements her income by prostitution. Blanca, the experienced madame who runs the house Carmen uses for her sexual encounters, warns José against Carmen. Carmen has a shady past and a devilish nature, but it is too late for José. He is already deeply in love. That same night, José waits in vain for Carmen in the brothel. She appears late, arriving in the company of his lieutenant. Furious, José challenges his superior to a sword fight and kills the man.

Now a criminal, with his career and place in society lost, José follows Carmen's advise and flees to the countryside, joining some of Carmen's bandit friends: Dancaire, Aristóteles, Señorito, and Juanele. José adapts quickly to his new life. He becomes one of the bandits, feared as "José the Basque". Soon, Carmen comes to join them in the hideout in the hills. Even in front of the other bandits, Carmen and José restart their passionate affair. Their idyll is broken by the sudden arrival of Carmen's gangster husband, El Tuerto, who has just been released from prison. José is initially extremely jealous but, fearing the consequences of clashing with the dangerous Tuerto, he has no other choice but to accept the circumstances. Carmen assures José that he is the one she loves. Without a choice of her own, she had been sold to El Tuerto when she was fourteen. Carmen makes an effort to make love to José as often as she does to her husband. The other bandits, in order to keep the peace in the group, keep quiet.

José continues to work with the bandit group, which is reduced in clashes with the authorities. Eventually José snaps and, with Carmen's aid, murders El Tuerto in a knife fight. Yet more trouble comes between them when the flirtatious Carmen catches the eye of Lucas, a dashing matador. Jose's paranoia and desire to possess Carmen entirely soon overwhelm him. When he discovers Carmen in bed with Lucas, José kills the bullfighter and runs away from the dead man's hacienda. Locked in an empty church with Carmen, José confronts her. Carmen does not love him any more and she is defiant. She dares him to kill her. Crying while they kiss, José murders Carmen with his knife.

== Cast ==
- Paz Vega as Carmen
- Leonardo Sbaraglia as José
- Jay Benedict as Prósper Mérimée
- Antonio Dechent as Tuerto
- Joan Crosas as Dancaire
- Josep Linuesa as Lucas
- Joe Mackay as Lieutenant
- María Botto as Fernanda
- Julio Vélez as Señorito
- Ismael Martínez as Antonio
- Simon Shepherd as Magistrado
- Emilio Linder as Aristóteles
- Miguel A. Valcárcel as Juanele
- Ginés García Millán as Tempranillo
- Susi Sánchez as Blanca
- William Armstrong as Fray Carmelo
- Paula Echevarría as Marisol

== Reception ==
While the quality of technical realization and costumes was acknowledged, viewers criticized the actors' performances, the lack of chemistry between the two main characters, and problems of the plot. The film is rated in several countries for scenes including nudity.

The film was voted the People's Favourite Film at the 2004 Birmingham Screen Festival.

== DVD release ==
The film was released on DVD in the United States in 2008.

== See also ==
- List of Spanish films of 2003
