= The Sky Is Falling (1975 film) =

The Sky is Falling
- Spanish video artwork
- Spanish: Las Flores del Vicio
- Literally: The Flowers of Vice
- Directed by: Silvio Narizzano
- Written by: Gonzalo Suárez; Win Wells
- Produced by: Andrés Vicente Gómez; Francisco Vives
- Starring: Dennis Hopper; Carroll Baker; Win Wells; Richard Todd; Faith Brook
- Edited by: Nicholas Wentworth
- Music by: José Nieto
- Distributed by: Cineteca S.A.
- Release date: 22 October 1979 (Spain)
- Running time: 94 minutes
- Countries: Spain; Liechtenstein
- Languages: English; Spanish

The Sky Is Falling, (Note: Stylized onscreen as The Sky Is Falling/The Sky Is Falling.) also known as Las Flores Del Vicio (English: The Flowers of Vice), released in the United States as Bloodbath, is a 1975 horror film directed by Silvio Narizzano, written by Gonzalo Suarez and Win Wells, and starring Dennis Hopper, Carroll Baker, Richard Todd, Faith Brook, and Win Wells. The plot follows a group of hopeless American and British expatriates living in a Spanish village where citizens are dying mysterious deaths after the arrival of a strange religious cult.

The film has been characterized as an example of the frenetic roles played by Hopper in the 1970s.

== Plot ==
A heroin-addicted poet named Chicken, struggling to separate reality from fantasy, lives in a small, secluded Spanish village with his girlfriend Susannah and other expatriates. These include a washed up actress named Treasure Evans; Terence, a retired British Air Corps captain and his alcoholic wife Heather; and a jaded flamboyant homosexual man named Allen.

Chicken struggles with his addiction while having vivid hallucinations about his religious mother. Treasure is always waiting for a call from Hollywood in order to stage a comeback, and spends her time showing off her album of publicity photos and regaling stories of her glory days. The expatriates, bored by their life in the village, encounter a group of young hippies—members of a strange religious cult—who arrive by boat, greeted by a group of Spanish locals. The cultists soon begin to infiltrate the local Catholic Church, ingratiating and overtaking the parish. A series of child deaths begin occurring in the community, which the expatriates observe the funerals processions of.

Soon after, Susannah is killed and strung up alongside several butchered hogs. Meanwhile, Treasure carries on an affair with one of the cultists, while Terence is seduced by a female member, and Allen begins to romance a male member of the cult. Terence is subsequently shot to death execution-style and goes missing, leading Heather to become increasingly suspicious of the cult members and further indulge in alcohol consumption. Treasure is perturbed by numerous phone calls from her Hollywood agent, of which she becomes increasingly defiant.

The villagers prepare to celebrate the coming of Good Friday. Chicken is further tormented by memories and visions of his religious childhood, including his baptism as a child, which traumatized him. Allen and his male lover begin to finally consummate their relationship one night in a barn, before the cultist unleashes a horned bull which gores Allen to death by impaling his anus. Meanwhile, Treasure, in a drunken state, has a vision in which she is violently gang raped by a group of men at her villa. Upon awakening to her ringing telephone, she imagines herself being terrorized by a group of young shirtless men who humiliate her before she falls into her swimming pool and drowns.

Amidst the ensuing chaos, Chicken nearly overdoses on heroin in his home before wandering through the streets of the village, where, in a hallucinatory state, he encounters an elderly villager and a small child. The woman and child begin to resemble he and his mother. At dawn, Chicken rushes along the beach in a panicked state before collapsing and dying on the shore.

== Cast ==
- Dennis Hopper as Chicken
- Carroll Baker as Treasure Evans
- Richard Todd as Terence
- Faith Brook as Heather
- Win Wells as Allen
- David Carpenter as Salt
- Alibe Parsons as Susannah
- Inma de Santis as Currination
- Curtis Moseley as Young Chicken
- Ana Pastor as Pucherita

== Production ==
The film was shot in Mojacar, Almeria, Spain in 1979, a small seaside village of local Spaniards, British and American expatriates, some of whom were featured in this movie. One of the extras, a young boy who was trampled at the end of the movie, looking towards the sky, was an American living in Spain whose parents ran a local saloon (El Saloon) and had befriended the director and many of the cast members.

According to Richard Todd, the film originally starred Shelley Winters but she was replaced by Carroll Baker. Both Carroll Baker and Dennis Hopper, who had starred together in Giant (1956), had been out of major Hollywood pictures for some time when they were cast in the film; Baker had been living in Europe and making giallo and horror films in Italian productions.

Film critic Kim Newman notes that the cult featured in the film evokes that of the Manson family.

== Release ==
21st Genesis Home Video released the film on VHS in the United States under the title Bloodbath in 1988.

In 2023, Vinegar Syndrome made the film available on Blu-ray as part of their Villages of the Damned: Three Horrors from Spain, featuring it alongside similarly-themed folk horror films The Ancines Woods (1970) and Beatriz (1976).

== Reception ==
Stuart Galbraith of The Digital Bits awarded the film a D− rating, noting that Narizzano and "not-untalented Spanish screenwriter Gonzalo Suárez craft a thoroughly unappetizing, unpleasant film obsessed with humiliation, violent death, and animal cruelty."

Kenneth Godwin of the film review site Cagey Films also disliked it, writing: "Nothing works here and watching it filled me with embarrassment for the actors. I suppose it was an attempt to do something like Roddy McDowall’s Tam Lin (1970) or Barbet Schroeder’s More (1969), exposing the nihilistic decadence which was the residue of the counter-culture’s rejection of a moribund conformity. But while those earlier movies dug beneath the surface in their own different ways to discover the pain and confusion which had led their characters into dead ends, Narizzano’s movie just puts dysfunction on display – it’s little more than a freak show."

== Sources ==
- Newman, Kim (2011). Nightmare Movies: Horror on Screen Since the 1960s. London, England: Bloomsbury. ISBN 978-1-408-80503-9.
- Todd, Richard (1989). In Camera: An Autobiography continued. London, England: Hutchinson. ISBN 978-0-091-73534-0.
- Shipka, Danny (2011). Perverse Titillation: The Exploitation Cinema of Italy, Spain and France, 1960–1980. Jefferson, North Carolina: McFarland. ISBN 978-0-7864-4888-3.
- Weldon, Michael (1996). The Psychotronic Video Guide To Film. New York City, New York: St. Martin's Griffin. ISBN 978-0-312-13149-4.
