= Henry Wilfrid Carr =

British consular official (1894–1962)

Carr in Canadian Black Watch uniform, 1917

Henry Wilfrid Carr (22 February 1894 – 3 April 1962) was a British consular official in Zurich where, in 1918, he encountered James Joyce. They quarrelled, and Joyce caricatured Carr in Ulysses. The relationship between Carr and Joyce was portrayed in almost entirely fictional terms by Tom Stoppard in his 1974 comedy Travesties, in which Carr is the central character.

== The real Henry Carr ==
Henry Wilfrid Carr (Note: The spelling of his middle name as "Wilfred" is seen in some books, but official records give the spelling as "Wilfrid".) was born in Houghton-le-Spring, Sunderland, Co Durham, on 22 February 1894, one of the four children, all sons, of Thomas Carr, a draper, and his wife, Mary Ann. At the age of 17 Henry moved to Canada, where he worked for a bank. He volunteered for military service in the First World War and served in France with the Canadian Black Watch. He was badly wounded and taken prisoner. The gravity of his wounds caused the Germans to send him for treatment at a monastery where the monks nursed him to a partial recovery. He was then part of a group sent to neutral Switzerland, where he secured employment as an official in the British consulate in Zurich. He joined a newly-established amateur dramatic group, "The English Players", run by James Joyce and Claud Sykes. The group's first production was The Importance of Being Earnest with the opera singer Tristan Rawson as John Worthing and Carr as Algernon Moncrieff. The performance was a success, but Carr and Joyce fell out over the financial arrangements. They quarrelled furiously, and sued and counter-sued each other in the courts. The cases were not settled until February 1919. Joyce won his financial case but lost in a suit for slander.

In Zurich, Carr met Nora Tulloch, whom he married in 1919. They went to Canada where Carr joined a department store and became company secretary. By 1928 he was foreign manager of Henry Morgan and Co, based in Montreal. In 1928 he met Noël Dorothy Bach (1900–1990). He and his first wife divorced and he married Bach in New York in 1933. In 1934 they moved to England. At the time of the Second World War they were living in Sheffield. They were bombed out, and moved to a Warwickshire village, where Carr commanded the Home Guard. In 1962, while on a visit to London, he had a heart attack, and died in St Mary Abbots Hospital, Kensington on 3 April, aged 68.

== Joyce's Carr ==
In his novel Ulysses (1922), Joyce took his revenge on Carr by lampooning him together with the consul (Percy Bennett) and Compton, another former colleague from the English Players whom Joyce had turned against. Joyce's biographer Richard Ellmann puts it thus:

Originally Joyce intended to make Consul-General Bennett and Henry Carr the two drunken, blasphemous, and obscene soldiers who knock Stephen Dedalus down in the Circe episode; but he eventually decided that Bennett should be the sergeant-major, with authority over Private Carr, who however refers to him with utter disrespect.

Carr and Compton are described as having "swaggersticks tight in their oxters, as they march unsteadily rightaboutface and burst together from their mouths a volleyed fart". Carr is portrayed as coarse and foul-mouthed: "God fuck old Bennett. He's a whitearsed bugger. I don't give a shit for him," and "I'll wring the neck of any fucking bastard says a word against my bleeding fucking king".

The real Carr was well aware of Joyce's malicious depiction of him, but expressed his lack of concern about it.

== Stoppard's Carr ==
In the 1970s, Tom Stoppard, struck by the fact that Joyce, Vladimir Lenin and the Dadaist poet Tristan Tzara were all in Zurich in 1917, wrote a play that brought all three together in the unreliable memory of the octogenarian Carr looking back five decades later. In Travesties (1974) Carr is the central figure with the others in orbit around him. Carr is seen both as an old man reminiscing and as the young man of 1917 – the same actor plays both Carrs. The young Carr spies on Lenin, argues with Tzara about the nature of true art, is persuaded by Joyce to play Algernon and later quarrels over the cost of buying new trousers for the role. The old Carr concludes the first act:

I dreamed about him, dreamed I had him in the witness box, a masterly cross-examination, case practically won, admitted it all, the whole thing, the trousers, everything, and I flung at him – "And what did you do in the Great War?" "I wrote Ulysses," he said. "What did you do?"
Bloody nerve.

After further confused memories and mix-ups in the second act, the old Carr concludes the play:

Great days ... Zurich during the war. Refugees, spies, exiles, painters, poets, writers, radicals of all kinds. I knew them all. Used to argue far into the night – at the Odeon, the Terrasse – I learned three things in Zurich during the war. I wrote them down. Firstly, you're either a revolutionary or you're not, and if you're not you might as well be an artist as anything else. Secondly, if you can't be an artist, you might as well be a revolutionary …
I forget the third thing.

== Notes, references and sources ==
=== Sources ===
- Ellmann, Richard (1983). James Joyce (second ed.). Oxford: Oxford University Press. ISBN 978-0-19-281465-4.
- Fischer, Andreas (2020). James Joyce in Zurich: A Guide. Cham, Switzerland: Palgrave Macmillan. ISBN 978-3-030-51283-5.
- Joyce, James (1937). Ulysses. London: The Bodley Head. OCLC 220088060.
- Stoppard, Tom (1993). Travesties (second ed.). London: Faber & Faber. ISBN 978-0-571-10683-7.
