= Come Back, Little Sheba (play) =

1950 play by William Inge

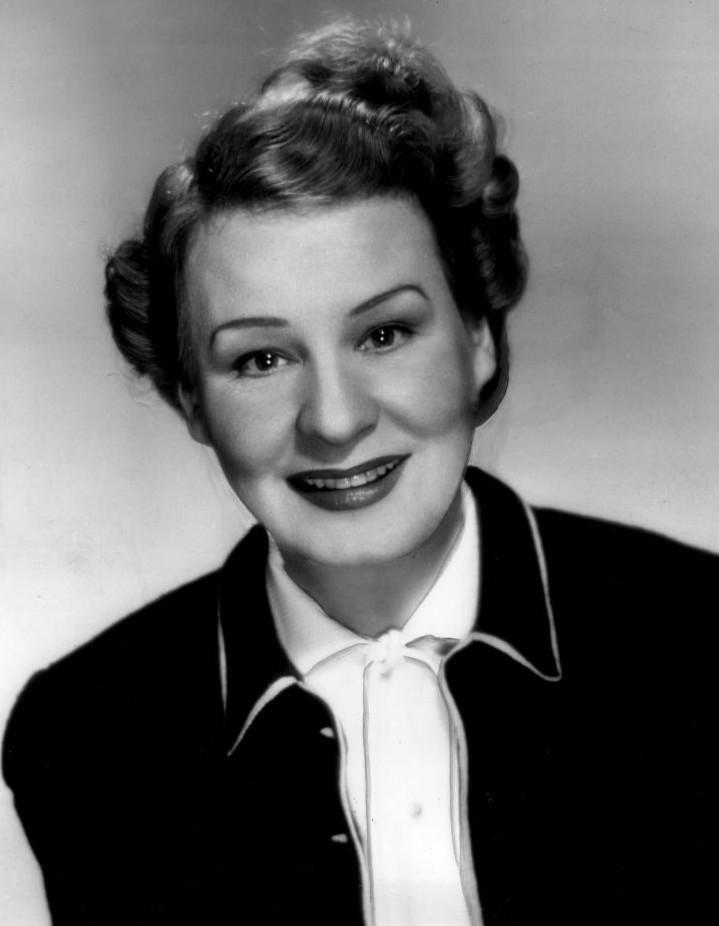
- Publicity photo of Shirley Booth in the 1950 Broadway production, for which she received a Tony Award for Best Performance by a Leading Actress in a Play
- Written by: William Inge

Premiere
- Date: 1950
- Place: Westport Country Playhouse

Come Back, Little Sheba is a 1950 play by the American dramatist William Inge. Inge wrote the play while he was a teacher at Washington University in St. Louis.

== Plot ==
Set in the Midwestern house of Lola and Doc Delaney, the plot centers on how their life is disrupted by the presence of a boarder, Marie, a college art student who has a keen interest in the young men around her.

Middle-aged Lola engages in mild flirtations with the milkman and the mailman. She sees in Marie a younger version of herself and encourages her pursuit of her hometown boyfriend, the wealthy Bruce, but also her classmate, the athletic Turk.

Doc, a chiropractor, abandoned a different career in medicine when he married a pregnant Lola, who subsequently lost the baby.

A recovering alcoholic, Doc maintains a precarious sobriety. To him, Marie represents youth and opportunities long gone; seeing her with Turk brings out resentments against Lola for ruining his life. Ultimately these feelings cause him to fall off the wagon, and act violently toward Lola. Frightened, she calls Doc's Alcoholics Anonymous sponsor, who comes to collect Doc and take him to a state asylum where he can be sobered up. When he comes back four days later, Marie has married Bruce and left, and he and Lola reconcile.

The title refers to Lola's missing dog, who disappeared before the play's opening and remains gone throughout the story. Lola hopes for the puppy's return throughout the play by calling "Come back, little Sheba" daily from the front door, but eventually faces reality and gives up on Sheba's return.

== Productions ==
The play premiered at the Westport Country Playhouse. Presented by the Theatre Guild and directed by Daniel Mann, the first Broadway production premiered at the Booth Theatre on February 15, 1950, and ran 190 performances. The opening night cast included Shirley Booth as Lola, Sidney Blackmer as Doc, and Joan Lorring as Marie. Booth won the Tony Award for Best Performance by a Leading Actress in a Play, and Blackmer won Best Actor.

Reprising her Broadway role, Booth starred opposite Burt Lancaster as Doc and Terry Moore as Marie in a 1952 film adaptation. Booth won both the 1953 Academy Award for Best Actress and Best Actress - Drama Golden Globe for her portrayal of Lola.

In 1974, Clint Ballard Jr. and Lee Goldsmith adapted the play for the musical stage. Kaye Ballard portrayed Lola in the Chicago tryout, but the production never reached Broadway as planned. In 2001, it was revived under the title Come Back, Little Sheba at the White Barn Theatre in Westport, Connecticut, with Donna McKechnie as Lola. A recording of this production was released by Original Cast Records.

A 1977 television version starred Laurence Olivier as Doc, Joanne Woodward as Lola, and Carrie Fisher as Marie. Granada Television produced the film as part of its Laurence Olivier Presents anthology series. In 2006, Acorn Media released the film as part of a DVD set with six other productions from the series.

In 1984, the Roundabout Theatre Company mounted an Off Broadway revival, directed by Paul Weidner and starring Shirley Knight as Lola, Philip Bosco as Doc, Mia Dillon as Marie, Steven Weber as Bruce, and Kevin Conroy as Turk. In his review in Time, William A. Henry III observed: "Like all of Inge's best plays, Sheba is slight of plot but musky with atmosphere...Middle age is portrayed as a time of aching sexual frustration, made more acute by the close-at-hand vision of youth...Inge did not transform his characters: they end where they began. But he understood them. In their interplay was genuine life, often blunted but ever resilient".

A Broadway revival of the Inge play opened on January 24, 2008, at the Biltmore Theatre. Directed by Michael Pressman, it starred S. Epatha Merkerson as Lola, Kevin Anderson as Doc, and Zoe Kazan as Marie, and ran through March 16. In his review for The New York Times, Ben Brantley called it a "deeply felt revival" and a "revitalizing production of a play often dismissed as a soggy period piece" and added "Ms. Merkerson allows a kind of intimate access traditionally afforded by cinematic close-ups, when the camera finds shades of meaning in impassive faces. She rarely signals what Lola's feeling; she just seems to feel, and we get it, instantly and acutely. Such emotional sincerity is the hallmark of this revival from the Manhattan Theater Club, directed with gentle compassion by Michael Pressman and featuring first-rate performances from Kevin Anderson and Zoe Kazan. The production's commitment to its characters uncovers surprising virtues in William Inge's play".

In 2017, the Transport Group put up a production Come Back, Little Sheba, which won the Obie Award for performance by Heather MacRae.

== Awards and nominations ==
=== Original Broadway production ===
Year	Award	Category	Nominee	Result
1950	Tony Award	Best Actor in a Play	Sidney Blackmer	Won
1950	Tony Award	Best Actress in a Play	Shirley Booth	Won

=== 2008 Broadway revival ===
Year	Award	Category	Nominee	Result
2008	Tony Award	Best Actress in a Play	S. Epatha Merkerson	Nominated
