= Travesties =

1974 play by Tom Stoppard

- Original language: English
- Written by: Tom Stoppard
- Characters: James Joyce; Bennett; Nadezhda Krupskaya; Tristan Tzara; Cecily Carruthers; Gwendolen Carr; Vladimir Ilyich Ulyanov; Henry Carr
- Subject: An extravaganza of political history, literary pastiche, and Wildean parody, introducing Dadaist Tristan Tzara, and Lenin and his wife
- Genre: Comedy
- Setting: Zürich, Switzerland, 1917

Premiere
- Date: 10 June 1974
- Place: Aldwych Theatre; London, England

Travesties is a 1974 play by Tom Stoppard. It centres on the figure of Henry Carr, an old man who reminisces about Zürich in 1917 during the First World War, and his interactions with James Joyce when he was writing Ulysses, Tristan Tzara during the rise of Dada, and Lenin leading up to the Russian Revolution, all of whom were living in Zürich at that time.

== Background ==
The real Henry Carr was a minor consular official who played Algernon in a production of The Importance of Being Earnest in Zürich in 1917 in a group of actors called The English Players, for whom the real James Joyce was the business manager. Carr and Joyce had an angry disagreement after the production, which led to legal action and accusations of slander by Joyce. The dispute was settled with the judge deciding in favour of both disputants on different counts. Joyce later had his revenge by parodying Carr and the English Consul General in Zürich at that time, Andrew Percy Bennett, as two minor characters in Ulysses, with Carr being portrayed as a drunken, obscene soldier in the "Circe" episode.

In the 1970s, Tom Stoppard, struck by the fact that Joyce, Vladimir Lenin and the Dadaist poet Tristan Tzara were all in Zurich in 1917, wrote a play that brought all three together seen through the unreliable memory of the octogenarian Carr looking back five decades later. In Travesties Carr is the central figure with the others in orbit around him. He is seen both as an old man reminiscing and as the young man of 1917 – the same actor plays both Carrs.

After the first performance of Travesties, Stoppard received a letter from Henry Carr's widow expressing her surprise that her late husband had been included as a character in Stoppard's play.

== Plot ==
The play is set in Zürich, Switzerland during the First World War and in the 1970s. In 1917, three historically important figures were living in Zürich: the modernist author James Joyce, the communist revolutionary Lenin, and the Dada founder Tristan Tzara. The play centres on the less notable Henry Carr, a British consular official, as he recalls his encounters with these three. As he reminisces, Carr's memory becomes prone to distraction, and the narrative veers away from historical accuracy.

The young Carr spies on Lenin, argues with Tzara about the nature of true art, is persuaded by Joyce to play Algernon and later quarrels over the cost of buying new trousers for the role. The old Carr concludes the first act:

I dreamed about him, dreamed I had him in the witness box, a masterly cross-examination, case practically won, admitted it all, the whole thing, the trousers, everything, and I flung at him – "And what did you do in the Great War?" "I wrote Ulysses," he said. "What did you do?"
Bloody nerve.

After further confused memories and mix-ups in the second act, the old Carr concludes the play:

Great days ... Zurich during the war. Refugees, spies, exiles, painters, poets, writers, radicals of all kinds. I knew them all. Used to argue far into the night – at the Odeon, the Terrasse – I learned three things in Zurich during the war. I wrote them down. Firstly, you're either a revolutionary or you're not, and if you're not you might as well be an artist as anything else. Secondly, if you can't be an artist, you might as well be a revolutionary …
I forget the third thing.

== Production history ==
=== Original production ===
Travesties was first produced at the Aldwych Theatre, London, on 10 June 1974, by the Royal Shakespeare Company. The production was directed by Peter Wood and designed by Carl Toms. It closed on 13 March 1976 after 156 performances at the Aldwych and the Albery Theatres in London, and the Ethel Barrymore Theater in New York.

- Henry Carr – John Wood
- Tristan Tzara – John Hurt
- James Joyce – Tom Bell
- Vladimir Lenin – Frank Windsor
- Bennett – Royce Mills
- Gwendolen – Maria Aitken
- Cecily – Beth Morris
- Nadya – Barbara Leigh-Hunt

Cast changes

- Tristan Tzara: Robert Powell; Tim Curry
- James Joyce: John Quentin; James Booth
- Vladimir Lenin: Harry Towb
- Gwendolen: Meg Wynn Owen
- Nadya: Frances Cuka

=== 1993 production ===
A revival of the play, directed by Adrian Noble and featuring a revised text that abbreviated Cecily's lecture on Lenin in Act II by moving much of it to the interval, was staged by the Royal Shakespeare Company at its theatre in the Barbican Arts Centre in September 1993. The production transferred to the Savoy Theatre in March 1994.

- Henry Carr – Antony Sher
- Tristan Tzara – David Westhead
- James Joyce – Lloyd Hutchinson
- Vladimir Lenin – Geoffrey Freshwater
- Bennett – Trevor Martin
- Gwendolen Carr – Rebecca Saire
- Cecily Carruthers – Amanda Harris
- Nadya – Darlene Johnson

=== 2016–2017 production ===
A new revival, directed by Patrick Marber, was performed at the Menier Chocolate Factory from September until November 2016. The production "broke box office records at the Menier Chocolate Factory, becoming the first play in the company’s history to sell out ahead of its first preview". In February 2017 the play, and company, transferred to the Apollo Theatre in London, where the run continued until April 2017.

- Henry Carr – Tom Hollander
- Gwendolen Carr – Amy Morgan
- Tristan Tzara – Freddie Fox
- Cecily Carruthers – Clare Foster
- Vladimir Lenin – Forbes Masson
- James Joyce – Peter McDonald
- Nadya – Sarah Quist
- Bennett – Tim Wallers

The production's designer was Tim Hatley, the lighting designer Neil Austin, and Adam Cork was the sound designer and composer of original music.

=== 2018 production ===
Patrick Marber's revival transferred to Broadway in spring 2018, with Tom Hollander reprising his role as Henry Carr and Peter McDonald reprising his performance as James Joyce. Travesties opened on 24 April 2018 at the Roundabout Theatre Company's American Airlines Theater in New York.

- Henry Carr – Tom Hollander
- James Joyce – Peter McDonald
- Tristan Tzara – Seth Numrich
- Lenin – Dan Butler
- Gwendolen – Scarlett Strallen
- Cecily – Sara Topham
- Nadya – Opal Alladin
- Bennett – Patrick Kerr

The Roundabout Theatre Company's education team have produced an 'Upstage' guide to Travesties which puts the play's themes in historical context and contains interviews with the director, cast, and crew. The revival has been praised by critics with Ben Brantley of The New York Times commenting that he "...would venture that this latest incarnation is the clearest and surely one of the liveliest on record. It should prove ridiculously entertaining for anyone with even a passing knowledge of its central characters, and a stroll through the groves of Wikipedia should offer adequate preparation for anyone else."

=== 2019 Australian production ===
The Australian premiere of the 2016 script adaptation opened in Melbourne in winter 2019, with Dion Mills taking the role of Henry Carr. The production was directed by Jennifer Sarah Dean.

- Henry Carr – Dion Mills
- James Joyce – Johnathan Peck
- Tristan Tzara – Matthew Connell
- Lenin – Syd Brisbane
- Gwendolen – Joanna Halliday
- Cecily – Gabrielle Sing
- Nadya – Milliana Cancur
- Bennett – Tref Gare

== Awards and nominations ==
Awards

1976 Broadway production

- 1976 New York Drama Critics' Circle Award for Best Play
- 1976 Tony Award for Best Play
- 1976 Evening Standard Award for Best Comedy
- 1976 Tony Award for Best Actor in a Play – John Wood

Nominations

2017 West End production

- Laurence Olivier Award for Best Revival
- Laurence Olivier Award for Best Actor – Tom Hollander
- Laurence Olivier Award for Best Actor in a Supporting Role – Freddie Fox
- Laurence Olivier Award for Best Actress in a Supporting Role – Claire Foster
- Laurence Olivier Award for Best Sound Design – Adam Cork
- WhatsOnStage Award for Best Play Revival
- WhatsOnStage Award for Best Supporting Actor in a Play – Freddie Fox

2018 Broadway revival

- Tony Award for Best Revival of a Play
- Tony Award for Best Actor in a Leading Role in a Play – Tom Hollander
- Tony Award for Best Sound Design of a Play – Adam Cork
- Tony Award for Best Direction of a Play – Patrick Marber
- Drama Desk Award for Best Revival of a Play
- Drama Desk Award for Outstanding Actor in a Play – Tom Hollander
- Outer Critics Circle Award for Outstanding Revival of a Play (Broadway or Off-Broadway)
- Outer Critics Circle Award for Outstanding Actor in a Play – Tom Hollander
- Outer Critics Circle Award for Outstanding Director of a Play – Patrick Marber
- Drama League Award for Outstanding Revival of a Broadway or Off-Broadway Play
- Distinguished Performance Award – Tom Hollander and Seth Numrich

== Sources ==
- Stoppard, Tom (1993). Travesties (second ed.). London: Faber & Faber. ISBN 978-0-571-10683-7.
