= Come Back, Little Sheba (Laurence Olivier Presents) =

- Laurence Olivier Presents episode
- A scene from Come Back, Little Sheba: (l–r) Carrie Fisher, Joanne Woodward and Laurence Olivier
- Directed by: Silvio Narizzano
- Based on: Come Back, Little Sheba; 1950 play by William Inge
- Editing by: Roy Beck
- Original air date: 31 December 1977
- Running time: 91 minutes

"Come Back, Little Sheba" is a 1977 videotaped television film production of the play of the same name by William Inge produced by Granada Television as part of the anthology series Laurence Olivier Presents transmitted in the UK by ITV on 1 January 1978. The selected plays were intended to represent "the best" in 20th Century theatre, staged for television. It aired in the United States on NBC on 31 December 1977.

The original play premiered on Broadway in 1950 and was subsequently filmed in 1952. In this version, the cast is led by Laurence Olivier as Doc Delaney and Joanne Woodward as Lola, and features Carrie Fisher as Marie, Patience Collier as Mrs. Coffman, Jay Benedict as Bruce, and Nicholas Campbell as Turk. It was directed by Silvio Narizzano.

The play was released as part of a 6-DVD set of Laurence Olivier Presents, which also includes "Cat on a Hot Tin Roof", "The Collection", "Saturday, Sunday, Monday", and "Hindle Wakes".

== Cast ==
- Laurence Olivier as "Doc"
- Joanne Woodward as Lola
- Carrie Fisher as Marie
- Nicholas Campbell as "Turk"
- Patience Collier as Mrs. Coffman
- William Hootkins as The Postman (credited as Bill Hootkins)
- Bob Sherman as The Milkman
- Sheridan Earl Russell as The Telegraph Boy
- Jay Benedict as Bruce
- Bruce Boa as Ed
- Ed Devereaux as Elmo
