= Hindle Wakes (play) =

Play written by Stanley Houghton

Hindle Wakes is a stage play by Stanley Houghton written in 1910. It was first performed in 1912.

== Plot ==
The play is set in the fictional mill town of Hindle in Lancashire in England, and concerns two youths, Fanny Hawthorn and Alan Jeffcote, who are discovered to be having illicit sex during the town's wakes week. Class is a major plot point in the play: Fanny is a mill-hand in the factory owned by Alan's father and their respective fathers once worked together before Mr Jeffcote senior rose to own a mill, while Mr Hawthorn continued as a mill worker.

After initial reluctance on the part of Mr Jeffcote senior, and the outright opposition of his wife (who suspects Fanny of being a gold-digger), the families pressure the couple to marry. To the great surprise of everyone (including Alan) Fanny refuses. She makes it clear that she regarded the dalliance with Alan as "a bit of fun" and considers him a poor choice for a husband. She is disowned by her people but expresses confidence that her skills as a weaver will allow her to support herself in the future.

== Performances ==
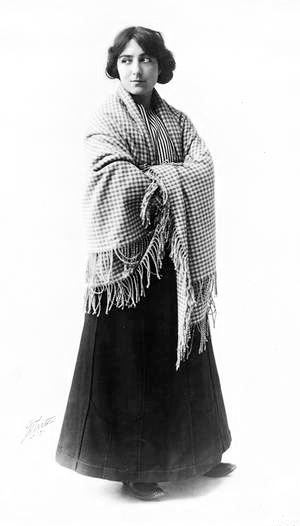
Emélie Polini as Fanny Hawthorn in the Broadway production of Hindle Wakes (1912)

The play was first performed in 1912 by Annie Horniman's Gaiety Theatre company, originally in Manchester and then in London and on Broadway. The character Fanny Hawthorn was played by Edyth Goodall in the original production. It was a controversial piece at the time it was first produced, and provoked a prolonged correspondence in the Pall Mall Gazette in which both the author, Stanley Houghton, and the original actress participated, with many correspondents questioning whether the play's treatment of non-marital sex would set a bad example. The Vice-Chancellor of the University of Oxford placed all the theatres performing it out of bounds to students.

It was the play in performance at the Royal Exchange Theatre during the 1996 Manchester bombing and the play with which the theatre reopened in December 1998 after almost two and a half years of repair works following the bomb damage. Both productions were directed by Helena Kaut-Howson with Ewan Hooper as Mr Jeffcote, Sue Johnston as Mrs Jeffcote, Colin Prockter as Mr Hawthorn, Nicholas Gleaves as Alan Jeffcote and Sophie Stanton as Fanny Hawthorn. The production won a MEN Award.

The hundredth anniversary of Stanley Houghton's Hindle Wakes was marked in 2012. In September 2012, the first London revival in over thirty years took place at Finborough Theatre (Earls Court) from the 11th to the 29th.

It has been filmed four times, twice in the silent era (1918, 1927), and twice in the sound era (1931, 1952) although the film versions have tended to open out the play considerably.

The 1931 film starred Belle Chrystal as the mill girl and John Stuart as the employer's son, with Sybil Thorndike, Edmund Gwenn and Norman McKinnel. Parts of it were filmed in Blackpool.

A version of it featured in the series Laurence Olivier Presents (1976), starring Judi Bowker, Donald Pleasence, Trevor Eve and co-directed by Laurence Olivier and June Howson.

Mint Theater Company produced it in New York City in 2018. This production was nominated for a Drama Desk Award Outstanding Revival of a Play. This was the first time it has been produced in the United States in 95 years.

== See also ==
- Chronology of stage, film and television performances given by Laurence Olivier
