= Laurence Olivier Presents =

British anthology TV series (1976-78)

- Created by: Laurence Olivier
- Starring: Laurence Olivier; Natalie Wood; Robert Wagner; Edward Woodward; Alan Bates; Malcolm McDowell; Helen Mirren; Joanne Woodward; Carrie Fisher; Joan Plowright; Arthur Lowe
- Country of origin: England
- No. of episodes: 6

Production
- Running time: 64 Minutes - 120 Minutes

Original release
- Release: 1976 – 1978

Laurence Olivier Presents is a British television anthology series made by Granada Television which ran from 1976 to 1978.

Olivier said "I have stood out stiffly and coldly and pompously about TV for too long". The plays, with the exception of Hindle Wakes, all starred Laurence Olivier. Some of the plays were based on productions staged at the National Theatre during the period when Olivier was Artistic Director. In addition to distinguished English actors, the casts assembled for these productions included several Hollywood stars, such as Natalie Wood, Robert Wagner, Joanne Woodward and Maureen Stapleton.

The individual plays adapted for television were:

- Cat on a Hot Tin Roof by Tennessee Williams
  - Starring Natalie Wood as Margaret, Robert Wagner as Brick, Maureen Stapleton as Big Mama Pollitt, Mary Peach as Mae, Jack Hedley as Gooper and Olivier as Big Daddy Pollitt
- The Collection by Harold Pinter
  - Starring Alan Bates as James, Malcolm McDowell as Bill, Helen Mirren as Stella and Olivier as Harry
- Hindle Wakes by Stanley Houghton
  - Starring Donald Pleasence as Nat Jeffcote, Rosemary Leach as Mrs. Jeffcote, Jack Hedley as Chris Hawthorn, Pat Heywood as Mrs. Hawthorn and Roy Dotrice as Sir Timothy Farrar
- Come Back, Little Sheba by William Inge
  - Starring Joanne Woodward as Lola, Carrie Fisher as Marie, Patience Collier as Mrs Coffman, Nicholas Campbell as Turk and Olivier as Doc
- Daphne Laureola by James Bridie
  - Starring Joan Plowright as Lady Pitts, Arthur Lowe as Gooch, Grégoire Aslan as George, Clive Arrindell as Ernst, Bryan Marshall as Vincent and Olivier as Sir Joseph
- Saturday, Sunday, Monday by Eduardo De Filippo.
  - Starring Joan Plowright as Rosa, Frank Finlay as Peppino, Edward Woodward as Luigi and Olivier as Antonio

== DVD ==
The series was also released by Acorn Media in September 2006 as a 6-DVD set with the same title, with The Ebony Tower, adapted from John Fowles' novella by John Mortimer, replacing Daphne Laureola .

The complete series was re-released by Network Media individually and as part of The Laurence Olivier Centenary Collection along with The Ebony Tower.
